= Probable ribosome biogenesis protein RLP24 =

Protein-coding gene in the species Homo sapiens

RSL24D1

Identifiers
- Aliases: RSL24D1, C15orf15, HRP-L30-iso, L30, RLP24, RPL24, RPL24L, TVAS3, ribosomal L24 domain containing 1
- External IDs: OMIM: 613262; MGI: 2681840; GeneCards: RSL24D1

Gene location (Human)
Chr.	Chromosome 15 (human)
Band	15q21.3	Start	55,180,806 bp
Band	15q21.3	End	55,197,049 bp

Gene location (Mouse)
Chr.	Chromosome 9 (mouse)
Band	9|9 D	Start	73,020,708 bp
Band	9|9 D	End	73,030,615 bp
RNA expression pattern
Bgee	Human / Mouse (ortholog); Top expressed in: germinal epithelium; Achilles tendon; parietal pleura; cartilage tissue; tibia; ganglionic eminence; amniotic fluid; ventricular zone; epithelium of nasopharynx; tail of epididymis / Top expressed in: morula; epiblast; embryo; embryo; ventricular zone; neural tube; blastocyst; ganglionic eminence; yolk sac; spermatid; More reference expression data
BioGPS	n/a
Gene ontology
Molecular function	structural constituent of ribosome; protein binding; RNA binding
Cellular component	cytosolic large ribosomal subunit; ribosome; nucleolus; intracellular anatomical structure; nucleus
Biological process	assembly of large subunit precursor of preribosome; protein biosynthesis; ribosomal large subunit assembly; ribosome biogenesis
Sources:Amigo / QuickGO
Orthologs
Databases	NCBI: entry; OMA: entry
Species	Human	Mouse
Entrez	51187	225215
Ensembl	ENSG00000137876	ENSMUSG00000032215
UniProt	Q9UHA3	Q99L28
RefSeq (mRNA)	NM_016304	NM_198609
RefSeq (protein)	NP_057388	NP_941011
Location (UCSC)	Chr 15: 55.18 – 55.2 Mb	Chr 9: 73.02 – 73.03 Mb
PubMed search
- Wikidata
View/Edit Human	View/Edit Mouse

Probable ribosome biogenesis protein RLP24 is a protein that in humans is encoded by the RSL24D1 gene.

This gene encodes a protein sharing a low level of sequence similarity with human ribosomal protein L24. Although this gene has been referred to as RPL24, L30, and 60S ribosomal protein L30 isolog in the sequence databases, it is distinct from the human genes officially named RPL24 (which itself has been referred to as ribosomal protein L30) and RPL30. The function of this gene is currently unknown. This gene utilizes alternative polyadenylation signals.
