= L32 =

L32 may refer to:

- 60S ribosomal protein L32
- Buick L32 engine, a V6 engine introduced in 2004
- General Motors L32 engine, a V6 engine introduced in 1993
- HMS Belvoir (L32), a destroyer of the Royal Navy
- HMS Shoreham (L32), a sloop of the Royal Navy
- Mitochondrial ribosomal protein L32
- Nissan Altima (L32), a Japanese automobile
- NRO L-32, an American reconnaissance satellite
