= 40S ribosomal protein S15a =

Protein found in humans

RPS15A

Identifiers
- Aliases: RPS15A, S15a, ribosomal protein S15a, DBA20
- External IDs: OMIM: 603674; MGI: 2389091; GeneCards: RPS15A
Available structures
PDB	Ortholog search: PDBe RCSB
PDB	List of PDB id codes 4UG0, 4V6X, 5A2Q, 5AJ0, 4KZY, 3J7R, 4D61, 4KZX, 4D5L, 4V5Z, 5FLX, 4UJD, 3J7P, 4KZZ, 4UJE, 4UJC

Gene location (Human)
Chr.	Chromosome 16 (human)
Band	16p12.3	Start	18,781,295 bp
Band	16p12.3	End	18,790,383 bp

Gene location (Mouse)
Chr.	Chromosome 7 (mouse)
Band	7|7 F1	Start	117,703,595 bp
Band	7|7 F1	End	117,715,411 bp
RNA expression pattern
Bgee	Human / Mouse (ortholog); Top expressed in: ganglionic eminence; Achilles tendon; left ovary; right ovary; granulocyte; ventricular zone; canal of the cervix; skin of abdomen; ectocervix; body of uterus / Top expressed in: ventricular zone; esophagus; embryo; genital tubercle; embryo; lip; yolk sac; morula; tail of embryo; blastocyst; More reference expression data
BioGPS	n/a
Gene ontology
Molecular function	structural constituent of ribosome; protein binding; RNA binding
Cellular component	cytoplasm; cytosol; ribosome; membrane; extracellular exosome; mitochondrion; nucleoplasm; extracellular matrix; cytosolic small ribosomal subunit
Biological process	viral transcription; response to virus; SRP-dependent cotranslational protein targeting to membrane; positive regulation of cell cycle; positive regulation of cell population proliferation; translational initiation; nuclear-transcribed mRNA catabolic process, nonsense-mediated decay; rRNA processing; protein biosynthesis
Sources:Amigo / QuickGO
Orthologs
Databases	NCBI: entry; OMA: entry
Species	Human	Mouse
Entrez	6210	267019
Ensembl	ENSG00000134419	ENSMUSG00000008683
UniProt	P62244	P62245
RefSeq (mRNA)	NM_001030009; NM_001019	NM_170669
RefSeq (protein)	NP_001010; NP_001025180	NP_733769
Location (UCSC)	Chr 16: 18.78 – 18.79 Mb	Chr 7: 117.7 – 117.72 Mb
PubMed search
- Wikidata
View/Edit Human	View/Edit Mouse

40S ribosomal protein S15a is a protein that in humans is encoded by the RPS15A gene.

Ribosomes, the organelles that catalyze protein synthesis, consist of a small 40S subunit and a large 60S subunit. Together these subunits are composed of 4 RNA species and approximately 80 structurally distinct proteins. This gene encodes a ribosomal protein that is a component of the 40S subunit. The protein belongs to the S8P family of ribosomal proteins. It is located in the cytoplasm. As is typical for genes encoding ribosomal proteins, there are multiple processed pseudogenes of this gene dispersed through the genome.
