= L37 =

L37 may refer to:

- 60S ribosomal protein L37
- Grand Canyon Caverns Airport, in Coconino County, Arizona
- HMS Hambledon (L37), a destroyer of the Royal Navy
- Mitochondrial ribosomal protein L37
- An engine of the Cadillac Northstar series
