= L24 =

L24 may refer to:

== Automobile engines ==
- Nissan L24 engine, a straight-six engine
- Saturn L24 engine, a straight-four engine

== Aviation ==
- Helio L-24 Courier, an American civil utility aircraft
- Paradise Skypark, an airport in Butte county, California

== Proteins ==
- 60S ribosomal protein L24
- Mitochondrial ribosomal protein L24

== Vessels ==
- HMS L24, a submarine of the Royal Navy
- HMS Blencathra (L24), a destroyer of the Royal Navy
- INS Airavat (L24), an amphibious warfare vessel of the Indian Navy
- Lapworth 24, an American sailboat design
