= L38 =

L38 may refer to:

- 60S ribosomal protein L38, a human protein
- Hightown, Merseyside postcode
- HMS Vanity (L38)
