= L23 =

L23 may refer to:

== Vehicles ==
- Beechcraft L-23 Seminole, an American military utility aircraft
- HMS L23, submarine of the Royal Navy
- HMS Whitley (L23), a destroyer of the Royal Navy
- INS Gharial (L23), an amphibious warfare vessel of the Indian Navy
- LET L-23 Super Blaník, a Czechoslovak glider
- Zeppelin LZ 66, an airship of the Imperial German Navy

== Other uses ==
- 60S ribosomal protein L23
- Mitochondrial ribosomal protein L23
- Nissan L23 engine, an automobile engine
- Pahute Mesa Airstrip (FAA identifier L23)
