= 60S ribosomal protein L36a =

Protein found in humans

RPL36A

Identifiers
- Aliases: RPL36A, L36A, L44L, MIG6, RPL44, ribosomal protein L36a
- External IDs: OMIM: 300902; GeneCards: RPL36A
Available structures
PDB	Human UniProt search: PDBe RCSB
PDB	List of PDB id codes 4UG0, 4V6X, 5AJ0, 3J7R, 4V5Z, 4UJD, 3J7P, 4D67, 3J92, 4D5Y, 3J7Q, 4UJE, 3J7O, 4UJC

Gene location (Human)
Chr.	X chromosome (human)
Band	Xq22.1	Start	101,390,824 bp
Band	Xq22.1	End	101,396,155 bp
RNA expression pattern
Bgee	Human / Mouse (ortholog); Top expressed in: ganglionic eminence; epithelium of colon; ventricular zone; left ovary; right ovary; right uterine tube; skin of abdomen; granulocyte; skin of leg; lactiferous gland / n/a; More reference expression data
BioGPS	n/a
Gene ontology
Molecular function	structural constituent of ribosome; protein binding; RNA binding
Cellular component	cytoplasm; ribosome; intracellular anatomical structure; cytosolic large ribosomal subunit; cytosol; plasma membrane; endoplasmic reticulum; polysomal ribosome
Biological process	cytoplasmic translation; viral transcription; SRP-dependent cotranslational protein targeting to membrane; translational initiation; nuclear-transcribed mRNA catabolic process, nonsense-mediated decay; protein biosynthesis; rRNA processing
Sources:Amigo / QuickGO
Orthologs
Databases	NCBI: entry; OMA: entry
Species	Human	Mouse
Entrez	6173	n/a
Ensembl	ENSG00000241343	n/a
UniProt	P83881	n/a
RefSeq (mRNA)	NM_021029; NM_001199972	n/a
RefSeq (protein)	NP_066357	n/a
Location (UCSC)	Chr X: 101.39 – 101.4 Mb	n/a
PubMed search		n/a
- Wikidata
View/Edit Human

60S ribosomal protein L36a is a protein that in humans is encoded by the RPL36A gene.

Cytoplasmic ribosomes, organelles that catalyze protein synthesis, consist of a small 40S subunit and a large 60S subunit. Together these subunits are composed of 4 RNA species and approximately 80 structurally distinct proteins. This gene encodes a ribosomal protein that is a component of the 60S subunit. The protein, which shares sequence similarity with yeast ribosomal protein L44, belongs to the L44E (L36AE) family of ribosomal proteins. Although this gene has been referred to as ribosomal protein L44 (RPL44), its official name is ribosomal protein L36a (RPL36A). This gene and the human gene officially named ribosomal protein L36a-like (RPL36AL) encode nearly identical proteins; however, they are distinct genes. As is typical for genes encoding ribosomal proteins, there are multiple processed pseudogenes of this gene dispersed through the genome.
