= L34 =

L34 may refer to:

- 60S ribosomal protein L34
- HMS Bicester (L34), a destroyer of the Royal Navy
- HMS Falmouth (L34), a sloop of the Royal Navy
- Nissan Altima (L34), a Japanese automobile
- Holden LH Torana SL/R 5000 L34, an Australian automobile
- Zeppelin LZ 78, an airship of the Imperial German Navy
