= 60S ribosomal protein L18a =

Protein found in humans

RPL18A

Identifiers
- Aliases: RPL18A, L18A, ribosomal protein L18a
- External IDs: OMIM: 604178; MGI: 1924058; GeneCards: RPL18A
Available structures
| PDB | Ortholog search: PDBe RCSB |
| PDB | List of PDB id codes 4UG0, 4V6X, 5AJ0, 4UJD, 4D67, 4D5Y, 4UJE, 4UJC |

Gene location (Human)
| Chr. | Chromosome 19 (human) |
| Band | 19p13.11 | Start | 17,859,910 bp |
| Band | 19p13.11 | End | 17,864,153 bp |

Gene location (Mouse)
| Chr. | Chromosome 8 (mouse) |
| Band | 8|8 B3.3 | Start | 71,347,366 bp |
| Band | 8|8 B3.3 | End | 71,350,056 bp |
RNA expression pattern
| Bgee | Human / Mouse (ortholog); Top expressed in: skin of leg; skin of abdomen; left ovary; granulocyte; right ovary; canal of the cervix; right uterine tube; lymph node; left uterine tube; spleen / Top expressed in: yolk sac; ventricular zone; spleen; urinary bladder; thymus; embryo; embryo; ganglionic eminence; lip; adrenal gland; More reference expression data |
| BioGPS | n/a |
Gene ontology
| Molecular function | protein binding; structural constituent of ribosome; RNA binding |
| Cellular component | cytosol; ribosome; membrane; cytosolic large ribosomal subunit; postsynaptic density; polysomal ribosome; synapse |
| Biological process | viral transcription; SRP-dependent cotranslational protein targeting to membrane; translational initiation; nuclear-transcribed mRNA catabolic process, nonsense-mediated decay; rRNA processing; protein biosynthesis; response to antineoplastic agent; cytoplasmic translation |
Sources:Amigo / QuickGO
Orthologs
| Databases | NCBI: entry; OMA: entry |
| Species | Human | Mouse |
| Entrez | 6142 | 76808 |
| Ensembl | ENSG00000105640 | ENSMUSG00000045128 |
| UniProt | Q02543 | P62717 |
| RefSeq (mRNA) | NM_000980 | NM_029751 |
| RefSeq (protein) | NP_000971 | NP_084027 |
| Location (UCSC) | Chr 19: 17.86 – 17.86 Mb | Chr 8: 71.35 – 71.35 Mb |
| PubMed search |
- Wikidata
| View/Edit Human | View/Edit Mouse |

60S ribosomal protein L18a is a protein that in humans is encoded by the RPL18A gene.

Ribosomes, the organelles that catalyze protein synthesis, consist of a small 40S subunit and a large 60S subunit. Together these subunits are composed of 4 RNA species and approximately 80 structurally distinct proteins. This gene encodes a ribosomal protein that is a component of the 60S subunit. The protein belongs to the L18AE family of ribosomal proteins. It is located in the cytoplasm. This gene is co-transcribed with the U68 snoRNA, which is located in its third intron. As is typical for genes encoding ribosomal proteins, there are multiple processed pseudogenes of this gene dispersed through the genome.
