= RPL22L1 =

Protein-coding gene in the species Homo sapiens

Identifiers
- Aliases: RPL22L1, ribosomal protein L22 like 1
- External IDs: MGI: 1915278; GeneCards: RPL22L1

Gene location (Human)
Chr.	Chromosome 3 (human)
Band	3q26.2	Start	170,864,875 bp
Band	3q26.2	End	170,870,208 bp

Gene location (Mouse)
Chr.	Chromosome 3 (mouse)
Band	3|3 A3	Start	28,859,585 bp
Band	3|3 A3	End	28,861,573 bp
RNA expression pattern
Bgee	Human / Mouse (ortholog); Top expressed in: cartilage tissue; body of pancreas; skin of arm; appendix; gums; gingival epithelium; ventricular zone; lymph node; spleen; skin of abdomen / Top expressed in: embryo; epiblast; embryo; ventricular zone; lens; uterus; pancreas; hypothalamus; ileum; ganglionic eminence; More reference expression data
BioGPS	n/a
Gene ontology
Molecular function	structural constituent of ribosome; RNA binding
Cellular component	cytosolic large ribosomal subunit; ribosome; intracellular anatomical structure
Biological process	cytoplasmic translation; protein biosynthesis
Sources:Amigo / QuickGO
Orthologs
Databases	NCBI: entry; OMA: entry
Species	Human	Mouse
Entrez	200916	68028
Ensembl	ENSG00000163584	ENSMUSG00000039221
UniProt	Q6P5R6	Q9D7S7
RefSeq (mRNA)	NM_001099645; NM_001320451	NM_026517; NM_001347226
RefSeq (protein)	NP_001093115; NP_001307380	NP_001334155; NP_080793
Location (UCSC)	Chr 3: 170.86 – 170.87 Mb	Chr 3: 28.86 – 28.86 Mb
PubMed search
- Wikidata
View/Edit Human	View/Edit Mouse

Ribosomal protein L22 like 1 (RPL22L1), or eL22L1, is a protein that in humans is encoded by the RPL22L1 gene.

== Function ==
eL22L1 is a ribosomal protein paralog of the eL22 protein of the 60S ribosomal subunit. This paralog is divergent from the normal copy, and is expressed when the normal copy is deleted from mice. This compensation implies a ribosome function similar to the normal copy, though eL22L1 has also been implicates in other extraribosomal roles including pre-mRNA splicing regulation in zebrafish.

== See also ==
- RPL22
- 60S ribosomal subunit
