= L35 =

L35 may refer to:

- 60S ribosomal protein L35
- Big Bear City Airport, in Big Bear City, California
- General Motors L35 CPI 90° V6 engine
- HMS Cattistock (L35), a destroyer of the Royal Navy
- Lahti L-35, a Finnish semi-automatic pistol
