= 60S ribosomal protein L19 =

Protein found in humans

RPL19

Identifiers
- Aliases: RPL19, L19, ribosomal protein L19
- External IDs: OMIM: 180466; MGI: 98020; GeneCards: RPL19
Available structures
| PDB | Ortholog search: PDBe RCSB |
| PDB | List of PDB id codes 4UG0, 4V6X, 5A2Q, 5AJ0, 4UJE, 4UJD, 4D67, 4V5Z, 4UJC, 4D5Y |

Gene location (Human)
| Chr. | Chromosome 17 (human) |
| Band | 17q12 | Start | 39,200,283 bp |
| Band | 17q12 | End | 39,204,840 bp |

Gene location (Mouse)
| Chr. | Chromosome 11 (mouse) |
| Band | 11|11 D | Start | 97,917,536 bp |
| Band | 11|11 D | End | 97,921,318 bp |
RNA expression pattern
| Bgee | Human / Mouse (ortholog); Top expressed in: gonad; Achilles tendon; granulocyte; lymph node; skin of thigh; left ovary; skin of hip; canal of the cervix; right ovary; olfactory zone of nasal mucosa / Top expressed in: epiblast; embryo; embryo; ventricular zone; thymus; urinary bladder; uterus; blastocyst; adrenal gland; ganglionic eminence; More reference expression data |
| BioGPS | n/a |
Gene ontology
| Molecular function | structural constituent of ribosome; protein binding; RNA binding; large ribosomal subunit rRNA binding; 5.8S rRNA binding |
| Cellular component | cytosol; ribosome; membrane; focal adhesion; intracellular anatomical structure; cytosolic large ribosomal subunit; polysomal ribosome |
| Biological process | protein biosynthesis; viral transcription; SRP-dependent cotranslational protein targeting to membrane; translational initiation; nuclear-transcribed mRNA catabolic process, nonsense-mediated decay; rRNA processing; cytoplasmic translation; liver regeneration |
Sources:Amigo / QuickGO
Orthologs
| Databases | NCBI: entry; OMA: entry |
| Species | Human | Mouse |
| Entrez | 6143 | 19921 |
| Ensembl | ENSG00000108298 | ENSMUSG00000017404 |
| UniProt | P84098 | P84099 |
| RefSeq (mRNA) | NM_000981; NM_001330200 | NM_001159483; NM_009078 |
| RefSeq (protein) | NP_000972; NP_001317129 | NP_001152955; NP_033104 |
| Location (UCSC) | Chr 17: 39.2 – 39.2 Mb | Chr 11: 97.92 – 97.92 Mb |
| PubMed search |
- Wikidata
| View/Edit Human | View/Edit Mouse |

Large ribosomal subunit protein eL19 is a protein that in humans is encoded by the RPL19 gene.

Cytoplasmic ribosomes, organelles that catalyze protein synthesis, consist of a small 40S subunit and a large 60S subunit. Together these subunits are composed of 4 RNA species and approximately 80 structurally distinct proteins. This gene encodes a ribosomal protein that is a component of the 60S subunit. The protein belongs to the L19E family of ribosomal proteins. It is located in the cytoplasm. As is typical for genes encoding ribosomal proteins, there are multiple processed pseudogenes of this gene dispersed through the genome.

== Pseudogenes ==
There are 21 pseudogenes: RPL19P1, RPL19P2, RPL19P3, RPL19P4, RPL19P5, RPL19P6, RPL19P7, RPL19P8, RPL19P9, RPL19P10, RPL19P11, RPL19P12, RPL19P13, RPL19P14, RPL19P15, RPL19P16, RPL19P17, RPL19P18, RPL19P19, RPL19P20, and RPL19P21.
