= 60S ribosomal protein L8 =

Protein found in humans

RPL8

Identifiers
- Aliases: RPL8, L8, ribosomal protein L8
- External IDs: OMIM: 604177; MGI: 1350927; GeneCards: RPL8
Available structures
PDB	Ortholog search: PDBe RCSB
PDB	List of PDB id codes 4CCM, 4CCN, 4CCO, 4UG0, 4V6X, 5AJ0, 4D67, 3J7Q, 4Y3O, 4UJC, 3J7R, 4D5Y, 4UJE, 4UJD, 3J7P, 3J7O, 3J92, 4V5Z

Gene location (Human)
Chr.	Chromosome 8 (human)
Band	8q24.3	Start	144,789,765 bp
Band	8q24.3	End	144,792,587 bp

Gene location (Mouse)
Chr.	Chromosome 15 (mouse)
Band	15|15 D3	Start	76,788,278 bp
Band	15|15 D3	End	76,790,514 bp
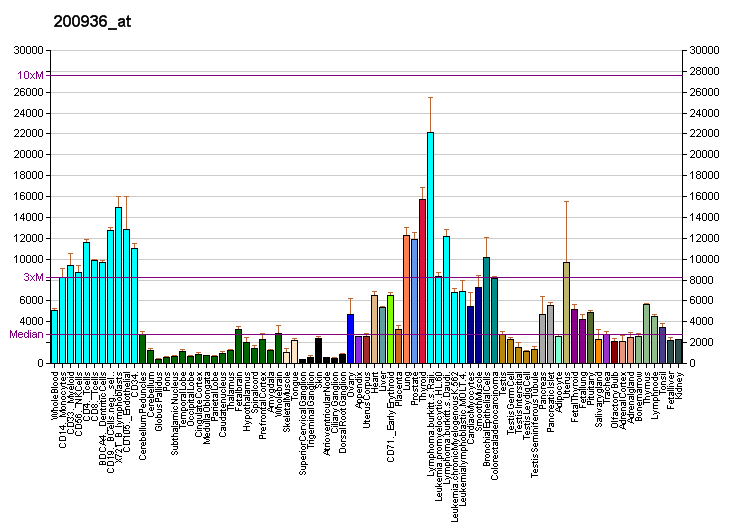
RNA expression pattern
Bgee	Human / Mouse (ortholog); Top expressed in: gonad; ovary; left ovary; trachea; right ovary; thymus; mucosa of transverse colon; ventricular zone; pituitary gland; skin of leg / Top expressed in: primitive streak; hair follicle; abdominal wall; efferent ductule; transitional epithelium of urinary bladder; medial ganglionic eminence; endothelial cell of lymphatic vessel; mandibular prominence; maxillary prominence; condyle; More reference expression data
BioGPS	More reference expression data
Gene ontology
Molecular function	rRNA binding; structural constituent of ribosome; RNA binding; 5.8S rRNA binding
Cellular component	cytosol; ribosome; membrane; focal adhesion; large ribosomal subunit; intracellular anatomical structure; cytoplasm; cytosolic large ribosomal subunit; postsynaptic density; polysomal ribosome; synapse; postsynapse
Biological process	cytoplasmic translation; protein biosynthesis; viral transcription; SRP-dependent cotranslational protein targeting to membrane; translational initiation; nuclear-transcribed mRNA catabolic process, nonsense-mediated decay; rRNA processing; cellular response to nerve growth factor stimulus
Sources:Amigo / QuickGO
Orthologs
Databases	NCBI: entry; OMA: entry
Species	Human	Mouse
Entrez	6132	26961
Ensembl	ENSG00000161016	ENSMUSG00000003970
UniProt	P62917	P62918
RefSeq (mRNA)	NM_000973; NM_033301; NM_001317771; NM_001317782	NM_012053
RefSeq (protein)	NP_000964; NP_001304700; NP_001304711; NP_150644	NP_036183
Location (UCSC)	Chr 8: 144.79 – 144.79 Mb	Chr 15: 76.79 – 76.79 Mb
PubMed search
- Wikidata
View/Edit Human	View/Edit Mouse

60S ribosomal protein L8 is a protein that in humans is encoded by the RPL8 gene.

Ribosomes, the organelles that catalyze protein synthesis, consist of a small 40S subunit and a large 60S subunit. Together these subunits are composed of 4 RNA species and approximately 80 structurally distinct proteins. This gene encodes a ribosomal protein that is a component of the 60S subunit. The protein belongs to the L2P family of ribosomal proteins. It is located in the cytoplasm. In rat, the protein associates with the 5.8S rRNA, very likely participates in the binding of aminoacyl-tRNA, and is a constituent of the elongation factor 2-binding site at the ribosomal subunit interface. Alternatively spliced transcript variants encoding the same protein exist. As is typical for genes encoding ribosomal proteins, there are multiple processed pseudogenes of this gene dispersed through the genome.
