= 60S ribosomal protein L13a =

Protein found in humans

RPL13A

Identifiers
- Aliases: RPL13A, L13A, TSTA1, ribosomal protein L13a
- External IDs: MGI: 1351455; GeneCards: RPL13A
Available structures
| PDB | Ortholog search: PDBe RCSB |
| PDB | List of PDB id codes 4UG0, 4V6X, 5AJ0, 4UJD, 4D67, 4D5Y, 4UJE, 4UJC |

Gene location (Human)
| Chr. | Chromosome 19 (human) |
| Band | 19q13.33 | Start | 49,487,510 bp |
| Band | 19q13.33 | End | 49,493,057 bp |

Gene location (Mouse)
| Chr. | Chromosome 7 (mouse) |
| Band | 7 B3|7 29.14 cM | Start | 44,774,982 bp |
| Band | 7 B3|7 29.14 cM | End | 44,778,185 bp |
RNA expression pattern
| Bgee | Human / Mouse (ortholog); Top expressed in: left ovary; right ovary; right uterine tube; canal of the cervix; skin of abdomen; ganglionic eminence; skin of leg; ectocervix; right lobe of thyroid gland; body of uterus / Top expressed in: ventricular zone; urinary bladder; yolk sac; ganglionic eminence; lip; ovary; thymus; adrenal gland; neural layer of retina; spleen; More reference expression data |
| BioGPS | n/a |
Gene ontology
| Molecular function | mRNA binding; RNA binding; structural constituent of ribosome |
| Cellular component | cytoplasm; cytosol; ribosome; membrane; focal adhesion; large ribosomal subunit; nucleolus; GAIT complex; cytosolic large ribosomal subunit; nucleus; ribonucleoprotein complex |
| Biological process | negative regulation of translation; viral transcription; SRP-dependent cotranslational protein targeting to membrane; negative regulation of formation of translation preinitiation complex; cellular response to interferon-gamma; translational initiation; nuclear-transcribed mRNA catabolic process, nonsense-mediated decay; regulation of translation; protein biosynthesis; rRNA processing |
Sources:Amigo / QuickGO
Orthologs
| Databases | NCBI: entry; OMA: entry |
| Species | Human | Mouse |
| Entrez | 23521 | 22121 |
| Ensembl | ENSG00000142541 | ENSMUSG00000074129 |
| UniProt | P40429 | P19253 |
| RefSeq (mRNA) | NM_001270491; NM_012423 | NM_009438 |
| RefSeq (protein) | NP_001257420; NP_036555 | NP_033464 |
| Location (UCSC) | Chr 19: 49.49 – 49.49 Mb | Chr 7: 44.77 – 44.78 Mb |
| PubMed search |
- Wikidata
| View/Edit Human | View/Edit Mouse |

60S ribosomal protein L13a is a protein that in humans is encoded by the RPL13A gene.

Ribosomes, the organelles that catalyze protein synthesis, consist of a small 40S subunit and a large 60S subunit. Together these subunits are composed of 4 RNA species and approximately 80 structurally distinct proteins. This gene encodes a ribosomal protein that is a component of the 60S subunit. The protein belongs to the L13P family of ribosomal proteins. It is located in the cytoplasm. Transcript variants utilizing alternative polyA signals have been observed. This gene is co-transcribed with the small nucleolar RNA genes U32, U33, U34, and U35, which are located in its second, fourth, fifth, and sixth introns, respectively. As is typical for genes encoding ribosomal proteins, there are multiple processed pseudogenes of this gene dispersed through the genome.
