= Ribosomal protein =

Proteins found in ribosomes

A large ribosomal subunit (PDB: 1FFK).

A small ribosomal subunit (PDB: 1FKA).

The two ribosomal subunits. Proteins are shown in blue and the RNA chains in brown and yellow.

A ribosomal protein (r-protein or rProtein) is any of the proteins that, in conjunction with rRNA, make up the ribosomal subunits involved in the cellular process of translation. Bacteria and archaea have a small ribosomal subunit (30S) and a large ribosomal subunit (50S). Eukaryotes have a small ribosomal subunit (40S), and a large ribosomal subunit (60S). Equivalent subunits are frequently numbered differently between bacteria, archaea, and eukaryotes.

A large part of the knowledge about these organic molecules has come from the study of E. coli ribosomes. All ribosomal proteins have been isolated and many specific antibodies have been produced. These, together with electronic microscopy and the use of certain reactives, have allowed for the determination of the topography of the proteins in the ribosome. More recently, a near-complete (near)atomic picture of the ribosomal proteins is emerging from the latest high-resolution cryo-EM data (including PDB: 5AFI).

== Conservation ==
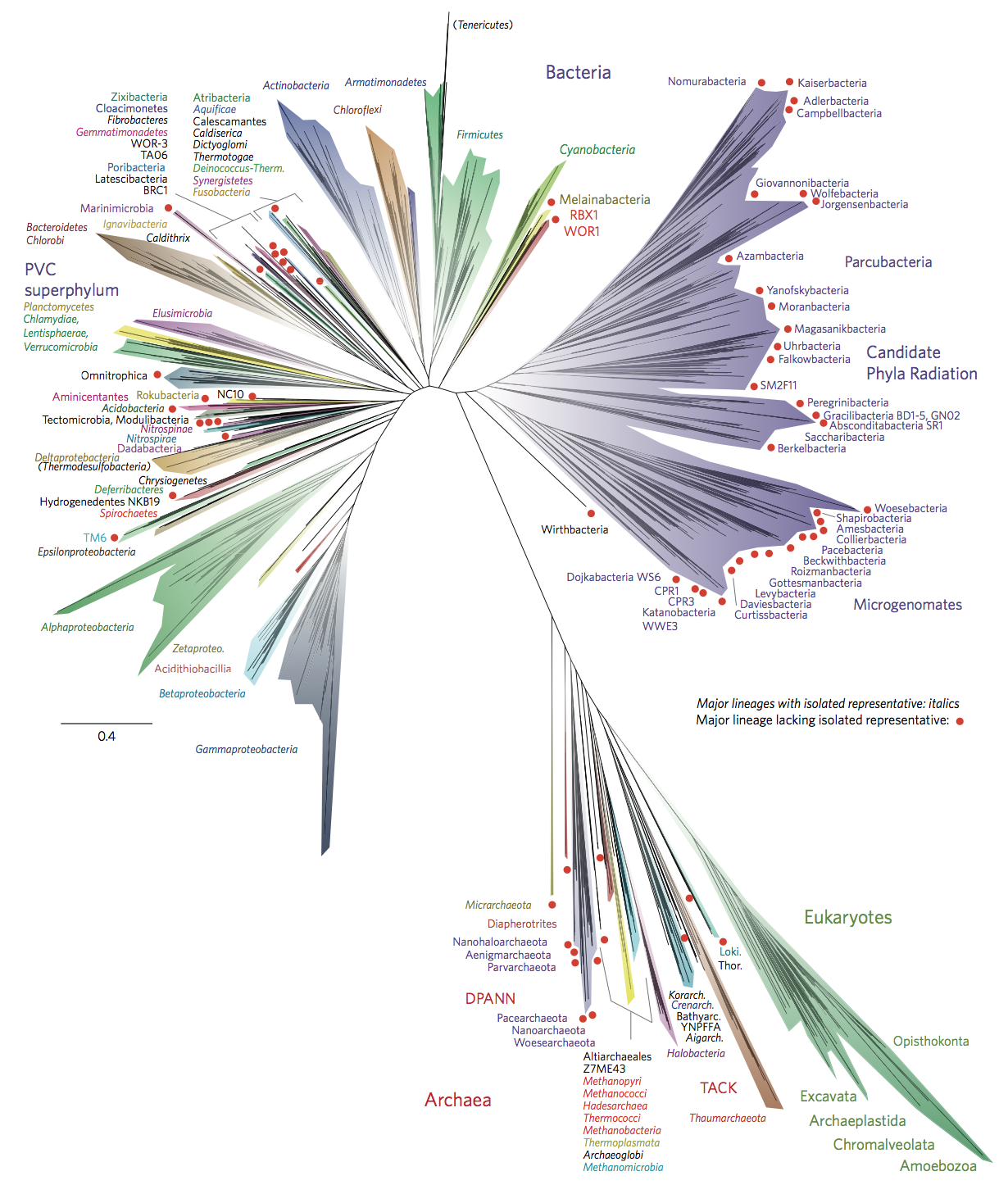
A 2016 tree of life using 16 universally-conserved ribosomal protein sequences

Ribosomal proteins are among the most highly conserved proteins across all life forms. Among the 40 proteins found in various small ribosomal subunits (RPSs), 15 subunits are universally conserved across prokaryotes and eukaryotes. However, 7 subunits are only found in bacteria (bS21, bS6, bS16, bS18, bS20, bS21, and bTHX), while 17 subunits are only found in archaea and eukaryotes. Typically 22 proteins are found in bacterial small subunits and 32 in yeast, human and most likely most other eukaryotic species. Twenty-seven (out of 32) proteins of the eukaryotic small ribosomal subunit proteins are also present in archaea (no ribosomal protein is exclusively found in archaea), confirming that they are more closely related to eukaryotes than to bacteria.

Among the large ribosomal subunit (RPLs), 18 proteins are universal, i.e. found in both bacteria, eukaryotes, and archaea. 14 proteins are only found in bacteria, while 27 proteins are only found in archaea and eukaryotes. Again, archaea have no proteins unique to them.

== Essentiality ==
Despite their high conservation over billions of years of evolution, the absence of several ribosomal proteins in certain species shows that ribosomal subunits have been added and lost over the course of evolution. This is also reflected by the fact that several ribosomal proteins do not appear to be essential when deleted. For instance, in E. coli nine ribosomal proteins (uL15, bL21, uL24, bL27, uL29, uL30, bL34, uS9, and uS17) are nonessential for survival when deleted. Taken together with previous results, 22 of the 54 E. coli ribosomal protein genes can be individually deleted from the genome. Similarly, 16 ribosomal proteins (uL1, bL9, uL15, uL22, uL23, bL28, uL29, bL32, bL33.1, bL33.2, bL34, bL35, bL36, bS6, bS20, and bS21) were successfully deleted in Bacillus subtilis. In conjunction with previous reports, 22 ribosomal proteins have been shown to be nonessential in B. subtilis, at least for cell proliferation.

== Assembly ==
=== In E. coli ===
The ribosome of E. coli has about 22 proteins in the small subunit (labelled S1 to S22) and 33 proteins in the large subunit (somewhat counter-intuitively called L1 to L36). All of them are different with three exceptions: one protein is found in both subunits (S20 and L26), L7 and L12 are acetylated and methylated forms of the same protein, and L8 is a complex of L7/L12 and L10. In addition, L31 is known to exist in two forms, the full length at 7.9 kilodaltons (kDa) and fragmented at 7.0 kDa. This is why the number of proteins in a ribosome is of 56. Except for S1 (with a molecular weight of 61.2 kDa), the other proteins range in weight between 4.4 and 29.7 kDa.

Recent de novo proteomics experiments where the authors characterized in vivo ribosome-assembly intermediates and associated assembly factors from wild-type Escherichia coli cells using a general quantitative mass spectrometry (qMS) approach have confirmed the presence of all the known small and large subunit components and have identified a total of 21 known and potentially new ribosome-assembly-factors that co-localise with various ribosomal particles.

==== Disposition in the small ribosomal subunit ====
In the small (30S) subunit of E. coli ribosomes, the proteins denoted uS4, uS7, uS8, uS15, uS17, bS20 bind independently to 16S rRNA. After assembly of these primary binding proteins, uS5, bS6, uS9, uS12, uS13, bS16, bS18, and uS19 bind to the growing ribosome. These proteins also potentiate the addition of uS2, uS3, uS10, uS11, uS14, and bS21. Protein binding to helical junctions is important for initiating the correct tertiary fold of RNA and to organize the overall structure. Nearly all the proteins contain one or more globular domains. Moreover, nearly all contain long extensions that can contact the RNA in far-reaching regions. Additional stabilization results from the proteins' basic residues, as these neutralize the charge repulsion of the RNA backbone. Protein–protein interactions also exist to hold structure together by electrostatic and hydrogen bonding interactions. Theoretical investigations pointed to correlated effects of protein-binding onto binding affinities during the assembly process

In one study, the net charges (at pH 7.4) of the ribosomal proteins comprising the highly conserved S10-spc cluster were found to have an inverse relationship with the halophilicity/halotolerance levels in bacteria and archaea. In non-halophilic bacteria, the S10-spc proteins are generally basic, contrasting with the overall acidic whole proteomes of the extremely halophiles. The universal uL2 lying in the oldest part of the ribosome, is always positively charged irrespective of the strain/organism it belongs to.

=== In eukaryotes ===
Ribosomes in eukaryotes contain 79–80 proteins and four ribosomal RNA (rRNA) molecules. General or specialized chaperones solubilize the ribosomal proteins and facilitate their import into the nucleus. Assembly of the eukaryotic ribosome appears to be driven by the ribosomal proteins in vivo when assembly is also aided by chaperones. Most ribosomal proteins assemble with rRNA co-transcriptionally, becoming associated more stably as assembly proceeds, and the active sites of both subunits are constructed last.

== Table of ribosomal proteins ==
In the past, different nomenclatures were used for the same ribosomal protein in different organisms. Not only were the names not consistent across domains; the names also differed between organisms within a domain, such as humans and S. cerevisiae, both eukaryotes. This was due to researchers assigning names before the sequences were known, causing trouble for later research. The following tables use the unified nomenclature by Ban et al., 2014. The same nomenclature is used by UniProt's "family" curation.

In general, cellular ribosomal proteins are to be called simply using the cross domain name, e.g. "uL14" for what is currently called L23 in humans. A suffix is used for the organellar versions, so that "uL14m" refers to the human mitochondrial uL14 (MRPL14). Organelle-specific proteins use their own domain-like prefixes, for example "mS33" for MRPS33 and "cL37" for PSRP5. (See the two proceeding citations, also partially by Ban N, for the organelle nomenclatures.)

Small subunit ribosomal proteins
Cross-domain name (Note: b = bacteria (+organelle); e = eukarya cytoplasm; u = universal; m = mitochondrion; c = chloroplast. Older nomenclature often have the order reversed, so that "bS1" becomes S1b or S1p (for "prokaryote").)	Pfam domain	Taxonomic range (Note: B = bacteria (+organelle); A = archaea; E = eukarya cytoplasm)	Bacteria name (E. coli UniProt)	Yeast name	Human name	Human mito	Plastid
bS1	PF00575	B	S1 P0AG67	—	—		
eS1	PF01015	A E	—	S1	S3A		
uS2	PF00318, PF16122	B A E	S2 P0A7V0	S0	SA		
uS3	PF00189, PF07650	B A E	S3 P0A7V3	S3	S3		
uS4	PF00163, PF01479	B A E	S4 P0A7V8	S9	S9		
eS4	PF00900, PF08071, PF16121	A E	—	S4	S4 (X, Y1, Y2)		
uS5	PF00333, PF03719	B A E	S5 P0A7W1	S2	S2		
bS6	PF01250	B	S6 P02358	—	—		
eS6	PF01092	A E	—	S6	S6		
uS7	PF00177	B A E	S7 P02359	S5	S5		
eS7	PF01251	E	—	S7	S7		
uS8	PF00410	B A E	S8 P0A7W7	S22	S15A		
eS8	PF01201	A E	—	S8	S8		
uS9	PF00380	B A E	S9 P0A7X3	S16	S16		
uS10	PF00338	B A E	S10 P0A7R5	S20	S20		
eS10	PF03501	E	—	S10	S10		
uS11	PF00411	B A E	S11 P0A7R9	S14	S14		
uS12	PF00164	B A E	S12 P0A7S3	S23	S23		
eS12	PF01248	E	—	S12	S12		
uS13	PF00416	B A E	S13 P0A7S9	S18	S18		
uS14	PF00253	B A E	S14 P0AG59	S29	S29		
uS15	PF00312	B A E	S15 P0ADZ4	S13	S13		
bS16	PF00886	B	S16 P0A7T3	—	—		
uS17	PF00366	B A E	S17 P0AG63	S11	S11		
eS17	PF00366	A E	—	S17	S17		
bS18	PF01084	B	S18 P0A7T7	—	—		
uS19	PF00203	B A E	S19 P0A7U3	S15	S15		
eS19	PF01090	A E	—	S19	S19		
bS20	PF01649	B	S20 P0A7U7	—	—		
bS21	PF01165	B	S21 P68681	—	—		
bTHX	PF17070, PF17067	B	THX (missing from E. coli)	—	—		
eS21	PF01249	E	—	S21	S21		
eS24	PF01282	A E	—	S24	S24		
eS25	PF03297	A E	—	S25	S25		
eS26	PF01283	E	—	S26	S26		
eS27	PF01667	A E	—	S27	S27		
eS28	PF01200	A E	—	S28	S28		
eS30	PF04758	A E	—	S30	S30		
eS31	PF01599	A E	—	S31	S27A		
RACK1	PF00400	E	—	Asc1	RACK1		

Large subunit ribosomal proteins
Cross-domain name	Pfam domains	Taxonomic range	Bacteria name (E. coli UniProt)	Yeast name	Human name	Human mito	Plastid
uL1	PF00687	B A E	L1 P0A7L0	L1	L10A		
uL2	PF03947, PF00181	B A E	L2 P60422	L2	L8		
uL3	PF00297	B A E	L3 P60438	L3	L3		
uL4	PF00573	B A E	L4 P60723	L4	L4		
uL5	PF00281, PF00673 (b)	B A E	L5 P62399	L11	L11		
uL6	PF00347	B A E	L6 P0AG55	L9	L9		
eL6	PF01159, PF03868	E	—	L6	L6		
eL8	PF01248	A E	—	L8	L7A		
bL9	PF01281, PF03948	B	L9 P0A7R1	—	—		
uL10	PF00466	B A E	L10 P0A7J3	P0	P0		
uL11	PF03946, PF00298	B A E	L11 P0A7J7	L12	L12		
bL12	PF16320, PF00542	B	L7/L12 P0A7K2	—	—		
uL13	PF00572	B A E	L13 P0AA10	L16	L13A		
eL13	PF01294	A E	—	L13	L13		
uL14	PF00238	B A E	L14 P0ADY3	L23	L23		
eL14	PF01929	A E	—	L14	L14		
uL15	PF00828	B A E	L15 P02413	L28	L27A		
eL15	PF00827	A E	—	L15	L15		
uL16	PF00252	B A E	L16 P0ADY7	L10	L10		
bL17	PF01196	B	L17 P0AG44	—	—		
uL18	PF00861	B A E	L18 P0C018	L5	L5		
eL18	PF00828	A E	—	L18	L18		
bL19	PF01245	B	L19 B1LPB3	—	—		
eL19	PF01280	A E	—	L19	L19		
bL20	PF00453	B	L20 P0A7L3	—	—		
eL20	PF01775	E	—	L20	L18A		
bL21	PF00829	B	L21 P0AG48	—	—		
eL21	PF01157	A E	—	L21	L21		
uL22	PF00237	B A E	L22 P61175	L17	L17		
eL22	PF01776	E	—	L22	L22		
uL23	PF00276, PF03939 (e)	B A E	L23 P0ADZ0	L25	L23A		
uL24	PF00467 (b), PF16906 (ae)	B A E	L24 P60624	L26	L26		
eL24	PF01246	A E	—	L24	L24		
bL25	PF01386	B	L25 P68919	—	—		
bL27	PF01016	B	L27 P0A7M0	—	—		
eL27	PF01777	E	—	L27	L27		
bL28	PF00830	B	L28 P0A7M2	—	—		
eL28	PF01778	E	—	—	L28		
uL29	PF00831	B A E	L29 P0A7M6	L35	L35		
eL29	PF01779	E	—	L29	L29		
uL30	PF00327	B A E	L30 P0AG51	L7	L7		
eL30	PF01248	A E	—	L30	L30 (L7A)		
bL31	PF01197	B	L31 P0A7M9	—	—		
eL31	PF01198	A E	—	L31	L31		
bL32	PF01783	B	L32 C4ZS29	—	—		
eL32	PF01655	A E	—	L32	L32		
bL33	PF00471	B	L33 P0A7N9	—	—		
eL33	PF01247	A E	—	L33	L35A		
bL34	PF00468	B	L34 P0A7P6	—	—		
eL34	PF01199	A E	—	L34	L34		
bL35	PF01632	B	L35 P0A7Q2	—	—		
bL36	PF00444	B	L36 P0A7Q7	—	—		
eL36	PF01158	E	—	L36	L36		
eL37	PF01907	A E	—	L37	L37		
eL38	PF01781	A E	—	L38	L38		
eL39	PF00832	A E	—	L39	L39		
eL40	PF01020	A E	—	L40	L40		
eL41	PF05162	A E	—	L41	L41		
eL42	PF00935	A E	—	L42	L36A		
eL43	PF01780	A E	—	L43	L37A		
P1/P2	PF00428	A E	—	P1/P2 (AB)	P1/P2 (αβ)		

== See also ==
- Alpha operon ribosome binding site
- Ribosomal protein L20 leader
- Mitochondrial ribosome, for a list of its protein subunits
