= 60S ribosomal protein L9 =

Protein found in humans

RPL9
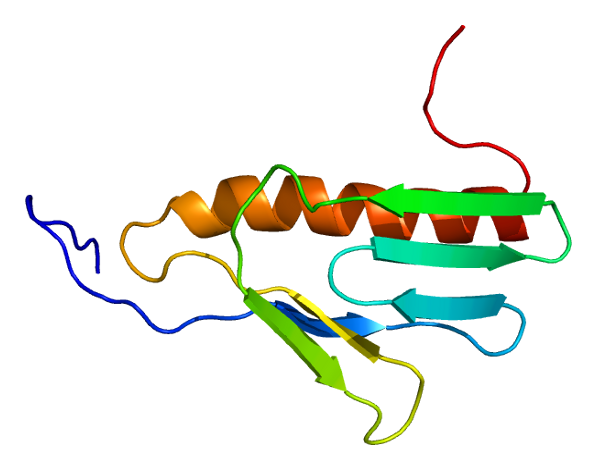

Identifiers
- Aliases: RPL9, L9, NPC-A-16, ribosomal protein L9
- External IDs: OMIM: 603686; MGI: 1298373; GeneCards: RPL9
Available structures
| PDB | Ortholog search: PDBe RCSB |
| PDB | List of PDB id codes 2CQL, 4UG0, 4V6X, 5AJ0, 3J92, 4UJC, 3J7P, 4UJE, 3J7Q, 3J7R, 4D67, 4UJD, 4V5Z, 4D5Y, 3J7O |

Gene location (Human)
| Chr. | Chromosome 4 (human) |
| Band | 4p14 | Start | 39,452,587 bp |
| Band | 4p14 | End | 39,458,931 bp |

Gene location (Mouse)
| Chr. | Chromosome 5 (mouse) |
| Band | 5|5 C3.1 | Start | 65,545,707 bp |
| Band | 5|5 C3.1 | End | 65,548,787 bp |
RNA expression pattern
| Bgee | Human / Mouse (ortholog); Top expressed in: left ovary; right ovary; gastric mucosa; Achilles tendon; right uterine tube; ganglionic eminence; lactiferous gland; corpus callosum; olfactory zone of nasal mucosa; gallbladder / Top expressed in: dentate gyrus of hippocampal formation granule cell; ventricular zone; blastocyst; embryo; embryo; morula; lip; superior frontal gyrus; primary visual cortex; spermatocyte; More reference expression data |
| BioGPS | n/a |
Gene ontology
| Molecular function | rRNA binding; protein binding; RNA binding; structural constituent of ribosome |
| Cellular component | cytosol; ribosome; membrane; focal adhesion; intracellular anatomical structure; cytosolic large ribosomal subunit; nucleus; extracellular matrix |
| Biological process | cytoplasmic translation; protein biosynthesis; viral transcription; SRP-dependent cotranslational protein targeting to membrane; translational initiation; nuclear-transcribed mRNA catabolic process, nonsense-mediated decay; rRNA processing |
Sources:Amigo / QuickGO
Orthologs
| Databases | NCBI: entry; OMA: entry |
| Species | Human | Mouse |
| Entrez | 6133 | 20005 |
| Ensembl | ENSG00000163682 | ENSMUSG00000047215 |
| UniProt | P32969 | P51410 |
| RefSeq (mRNA) | NM_000661; NM_001024921 | NM_011292 |
| RefSeq (protein) | NP_000652; NP_001020092 | NP_035422 |
| Location (UCSC) | Chr 4: 39.45 – 39.46 Mb | Chr 5: 65.55 – 65.55 Mb |
| PubMed search |
- Wikidata
| View/Edit Human | View/Edit Mouse |

60S ribosomal protein L9 is a protein that in humans is encoded by the RPL9 gene.

Ribosomes, the organelles that catalyze protein synthesis, consist of a small 40S subunit and a large 60S subunit. Together these subunits are composed of 4 RNA species and approximately 80 structurally distinct proteins. This gene encodes a ribosomal protein that is a component of the 60S subunit. The protein belongs to the L6P family of ribosomal proteins. It is located in the cytoplasm. As is typical for genes encoding ribosomal proteins, there are multiple processed pseudogenes of this gene dispersed through the genome. Two alternatively spliced transcript variants encoding the same protein have been found for this gene.
