= 60S ribosomal protein L4 =

Protein found in humans

RPL4

Identifiers
- Aliases: RPL4, L4, Ribosomal protein L4
- External IDs: OMIM: 180479; MGI: 1915141; GeneCards: RPL4
Available structures
PDB	Ortholog search: PDBe RCSB
PDB	List of PDB id codes 4UG0, 4V6X, 5AJ0, 4UJD, 5A8L, 4D67, 4D5Y, 4UJE, 4UJC

Gene location (Human)
Chr.	Chromosome 15 (human)
Band	15q22.31	Start	66,498,015 bp
Band	15q22.31	End	66,524,532 bp

Gene location (Mouse)
Chr.	Chromosome 9 (mouse)
Band	9|9 C	Start	64,080,657 bp
Band	9|9 C	End	64,085,948 bp
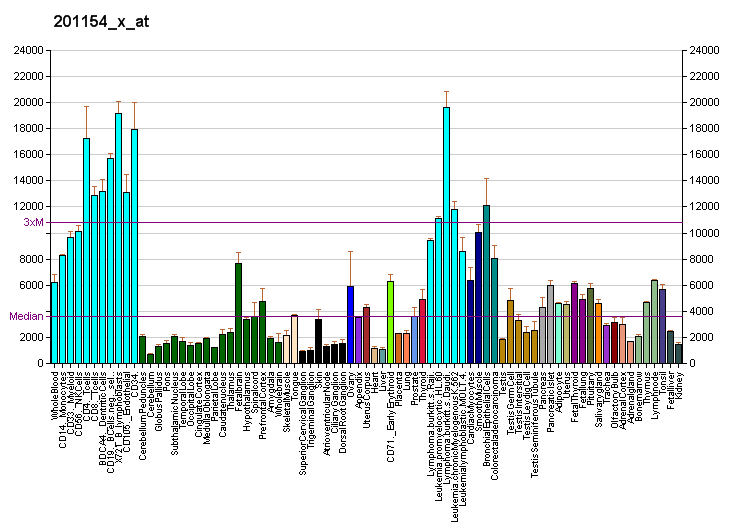

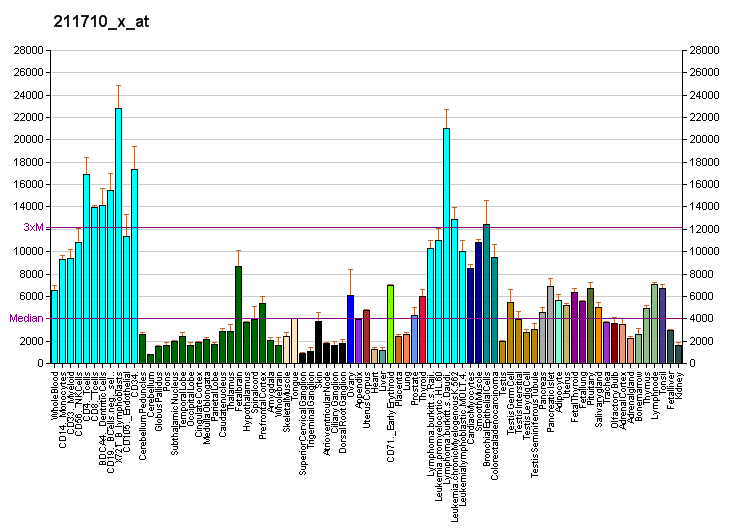
RNA expression pattern
Bgee	Human / Mouse (ortholog); Top expressed in: embryo; ganglionic eminence; cartilage tissue; ventricular zone; vulva; tail of epididymis; glutes; smooth muscle tissue; superficial temporal artery; caput epididymis / Top expressed in: tail of embryo; genital tubercle; epiblast; ovary; blastocyst; ventricular zone; ganglionic eminence; uterus; embryo; urinary bladder; More reference expression data
BioGPS	More reference expression data
Gene ontology
Molecular function	protein binding; structural constituent of ribosome; RNA binding
Cellular component	cytoplasm; cytosol; ribosome; membrane; focal adhesion; nucleolus; cytosolic large ribosomal subunit; extracellular exosome; nucleus; rough endoplasmic reticulum; ribonucleoprotein complex
Biological process	protein biosynthesis; viral transcription; SRP-dependent cotranslational protein targeting to membrane; translational initiation; nuclear-transcribed mRNA catabolic process, nonsense-mediated decay; rRNA processing; cytoplasmic translation
Sources:Amigo / QuickGO
Orthologs
Databases	NCBI: entry; OMA: entry
Species	Human	Mouse
Entrez	6124	67891
Ensembl	ENSG00000174444	ENSMUSG00000032399
UniProt	P36578	Q9D8E6
RefSeq (mRNA)	NM_000968	NM_024212
RefSeq (protein)	NP_000959	NP_077174
Location (UCSC)	Chr 15: 66.5 – 66.52 Mb	Chr 9: 64.08 – 64.09 Mb
PubMed search
- Wikidata
View/Edit Human	View/Edit Mouse

60S ribosomal protein L4 is a protein that in humans is encoded by the RPL4 gene.

Ribosomes, the organelles that catalyze protein synthesis, consist of a small 40S subunit and a large 60S subunit. Together these subunits are composed of 4 RNA species and approximately 80 structurally distinct proteins. This gene encodes a ribosomal protein that is a component of the 60S subunit. The protein belongs to the L4E family of ribosomal proteins. It is located in the cytoplasm. As is typical for genes encoding ribosomal proteins, there are multiple processed pseudogenes of this gene dispersed through the genome.
