= 60S ribosomal protein L27a =

Protein found in humans

RPL27A

Identifiers
- Aliases: RPL27A, L27A, ribosomal protein L27a
- External IDs: OMIM: 603637; MGI: 1347076; GeneCards: RPL27A
Available structures
PDB	Ortholog search: PDBe RCSB
PDB	List of PDB id codes 4BXF, 4UG0, 4V6X, 5AJ0, 4UJD, 4D67, 4D5Y, 4UJE, 4UJC

Gene location (Human)
Chr.	Chromosome 11 (human)
Band	11p15.4	Start	8,682,788 bp
Band	11p15.4	End	8,714,759 bp

Gene location (Mouse)
Chr.	Chromosome 7 (mouse)
Band	7 E3|7 57.26 cM	Start	109,118,354 bp
Band	7 E3|7 57.26 cM	End	109,121,574 bp
RNA expression pattern
Bgee	Human / Mouse (ortholog); Top expressed in: ganglionic eminence; bone marrow cell; anterior pituitary; left lobe of thyroid gland; mucosa of transverse colon; left ovary; right lobe of thyroid gland; olfactory zone of nasal mucosa; right uterine tube; stromal cell of endometrium / Top expressed in: epiblast; uterus; thymus; embryo; embryo; yolk sac; lens; ventricular zone; esophagus; spleen; More reference expression data
BioGPS	n/a
Gene ontology
Molecular function	protein binding; structural constituent of ribosome; RNA binding
Cellular component	intracellular anatomical structure; ribosome; large ribosomal subunit; membrane; cytosolic large ribosomal subunit; endoplasmic reticulum; cytosol
Biological process	nuclear-transcribed mRNA catabolic process, nonsense-mediated decay; SRP-dependent cotranslational protein targeting to membrane; viral transcription; translational initiation; protein biosynthesis; rRNA processing; cytoplasmic translation
Sources:Amigo / QuickGO
Orthologs
Databases	NCBI: entry; OMA: entry
Species	Human	Mouse
Entrez	6157	26451
Ensembl	ENSG00000166441	ENSMUSG00000046364
UniProt	P46776	P14115
RefSeq (mRNA)	NM_032650; NM_000990	NM_011975
RefSeq (protein)	NP_000981	NP_036105
Location (UCSC)	Chr 11: 8.68 – 8.71 Mb	Chr 7: 109.12 – 109.12 Mb
PubMed search
- Wikidata
View/Edit Human	View/Edit Mouse

60S ribosomal protein L27a is a protein that in humans is encoded by the RPL27A gene.

Ribosomes, the organelles that catalyze protein synthesis, consist of a small 40S subunit and a large 60S subunit. Together these subunits are composed of 4 RNA species and approximately 80 structurally distinct proteins. This gene encodes a ribosomal protein that is a component of the 60S subunit. The protein belongs to the L15P family of ribosomal proteins. It is located in the cytoplasm. Variable expression of this gene in colorectal cancers compared to adjacent normal tissues has been observed, although no correlation between the level of expression and the severity of the disease has been found. As is typical for genes encoding ribosomal proteins, multiple processed pseudogenes derived from this gene are dispersed through the genome.
