= 60S ribosomal protein L15 =

Protein found in humans

RPL15

Identifiers
- Aliases: RPL15, DBA12, EC45, L15, RPL10, RPLY10, RPYL10, ribosomal protein L15
- External IDs: OMIM: 604174; MGI: 1913730; GeneCards: RPL15
Available structures
| PDB | Ortholog search: PDBe RCSB |
| PDB | List of PDB id codes 4UG0, 4V6X, 5AJ0, 3J7R, 4V5Z, 4UJD, 3J7P, 4D67, 3J92, 4D5Y, 3J7Q, 4UJE, 3J7O, 4UJC,%%s3J7R, 4V5Z, 4V6X, 4UJD, 3J7P, 4D67, 3J92, 4D5Y, 5AJ0, 3J7Q, 4UG0, 4UJE, 3J7O, 4UJC |

Gene location (Human)
| Chr. | Chromosome 3 (human) |
| Band | 3p24.2 | Start | 23,916,591 bp |
| Band | 3p24.2 | End | 23,924,374 bp |

Gene location (Mouse)
| Chr. | Chromosome 14 (mouse) |
| Band | 14 A1|14 | Start | 4,198,305 bp |
| Band | 14 A1|14 | End | 4,201,873 bp |
RNA expression pattern
| Bgee | Human / Mouse (ortholog); Top expressed in: left ovary; left testis; right testis; right ovary; germinal epithelium; middle temporal gyrus; gonad; gallbladder; canal of the cervix; caput epididymis / Top expressed in: embryo; ventricular zone; embryo; morula; blastocyst; epiblast; yolk sac; primitive streak; lip; Gonadal ridge; More reference expression data |
| BioGPS | n/a |
Gene ontology
| Molecular function | protein binding; structural constituent of ribosome; cadherin binding; RNA binding |
| Cellular component | cytosol; ribosome; membrane; intracellular anatomical structure; extracellular exosome; nucleus; cytosolic large ribosomal subunit; A band |
| Biological process | cytoplasmic translation; protein biosynthesis; viral transcription; SRP-dependent cotranslational protein targeting to membrane; translational initiation; nuclear-transcribed mRNA catabolic process, nonsense-mediated decay; rRNA processing; response to ethanol |
Sources:Amigo / QuickGO
Orthologs
| Databases | NCBI: entry; OMA: entry |
| Species | Human | Mouse |
| Entrez | 6138 | 66480 |
| Ensembl | ENSG00000174748 | ENSMUSG00000012405 |
| UniProt | P61313 | Q9CZM2 |
| RefSeq (mRNA) | NM_001253379; NM_001253380; NM_001253382; NM_001253383; NM_001253384 NM_002948 | NM_025586; NM_001359897; NM_001359899 |
| RefSeq (protein) | NP_001240308; NP_001240309; NP_001240311; NP_001240312; NP_001240313 NP_002939; NP_001240308.1; NP_001240309.1; NP_001240311.1; NP_001240312.1; NP_002939.2 | NP_079862; NP_001346826; NP_001346828 |
| Location (UCSC) | Chr 3: 23.92 – 23.92 Mb | Chr 14: 4.2 – 4.2 Mb |
| PubMed search |
- Wikidata
| View/Edit Human | View/Edit Mouse |

60S ribosomal protein L15 is a protein that in humans is encoded by the RPL15 gene.

Ribosomes, the organelles that catalyze protein synthesis, consist of a small 40S subunit and a large 60S subunit. Together these subunits are composed of 4 RNA species and approximately 80 structurally distinct proteins. This gene encodes a ribosomal protein that is a component of the 60S subunit. The protein belongs to the L15E family of ribosomal proteins. It is located in the cytoplasm. This gene shares sequence similarity with the yeast ribosomal protein YL10 gene. Although this gene has been referred to as RPL10, its official symbol is RPL15. This gene has been shown to be overexpressed in some esophageal tumors compared to normal matched tissues. Transcript variants utilizing alternative polyA signals exist. As is typical for genes encoding ribosomal proteins, there are multiple processed pseudogenes of this gene dispersed through the genome.
