= 60S ribosomal protein L21 =

Protein found in humans

RPL21

Identifiers
- Aliases: RPL21, HYPT12, L21, ribosomal protein L21
- External IDs: OMIM: 603636; MGI: 1278340; GeneCards: RPL21
Available structures
PDB	Ortholog search: PDBe RCSB
PDB	List of PDB id codes 4UG0, 4V6X, 5AJ0, 3J7R, 4UJD, 3J7P, 4D67, 3J92, 4D5Y, 3J7Q, 4UJE, 3J7O, 4UJC

Gene location (Human)
Chr.	Chromosome 13 (human)
Band	13q12.2	Start	27,251,362 bp
Band	13q12.2	End	27,256,691 bp

Gene location (Mouse)
Chr.	Chromosome 5 (mouse)
Band	5|5 G3	Start	146,769,700 bp
Band	5|5 G3	End	146,773,842 bp
RNA expression pattern
Bgee	Human / Mouse (ortholog); Top expressed in: Achilles tendon; ganglionic eminence; primary visual cortex; epithelium of colon; endometrium; lymph node; ventricular zone; white blood cell; monocyte; superior frontal gyrus / Top expressed in: ovary; urinary bladder; ventricular zone; ganglionic eminence; lens; zone of skin; uterus; adrenal gland; esophagus; ileum; More reference expression data
BioGPS	n/a
Gene ontology
Molecular function	protein binding; RNA binding; structural constituent of ribosome
Cellular component	cytosol; ribosome; membrane; intracellular anatomical structure; cytosolic large ribosomal subunit; cytoplasm; endoplasmic reticulum
Biological process	viral transcription; SRP-dependent cotranslational protein targeting to membrane; translational initiation; nuclear-transcribed mRNA catabolic process, nonsense-mediated decay; rRNA processing; protein biosynthesis
Sources:Amigo / QuickGO
Orthologs
Databases	NCBI: entry; OMA: entry
Species	Human	Mouse
Entrez	6144	19933
Ensembl	ENSG00000122026	ENSMUSG00000041453
UniProt	P46778	O09167; Q9CQM8
RefSeq (mRNA)	NM_000982	NM_019647
RefSeq (protein)	NP_000973	NP_062621
Location (UCSC)	Chr 13: 27.25 – 27.26 Mb	Chr 5: 146.77 – 146.77 Mb
PubMed search
- Wikidata
View/Edit Human	View/Edit Mouse

60S ribosomal protein L21 is a protein that in humans is encoded by the RPL21 gene.

Ribosomes, the organelles that catalyze protein synthesis, consist of a small 40S subunit and a large 60S subunit. Together these subunits are composed of 4 RNA species and approximately 80 structurally distinct proteins. This gene encodes a ribosomal protein that is a component of the 60S subunit. The protein belongs to the L21E family of ribosomal proteins. It is located in the cytoplasm. As is typical for genes encoding ribosomal proteins, there are multiple processed pseudogenes of this gene dispersed through the genome.

== Clinical relevance ==
Mutations in the RPL21 gene result in Hypotrichosis simplex of the scalp.
