= 60S ribosomal protein L37a =

Protein found in humans

RPL37A

Identifiers
- Aliases: RPL37A, L37A, ribosomal protein L37a
- External IDs: OMIM: 613314; MGI: 98068; GeneCards: RPL37A
Available structures
PDB	Ortholog search: PDBe RCSB
PDB	List of PDB id codes 4UG0, 4V6X, 5AJ0, 3J92, 4UJE, 4UJD, 4D67, 4V5Z, 4UJC, 4D5Y

Gene location (Human)
Chr.	Chromosome 2 (human)
Band	2q35	Start	216,498,825 bp
Band	2q35	End	216,579,180 bp

Gene location (Mouse)
Chr.	Chromosome 1 (mouse)
Band	1|1 C3	Start	72,750,449 bp
Band	1|1 C3	End	72,752,972 bp
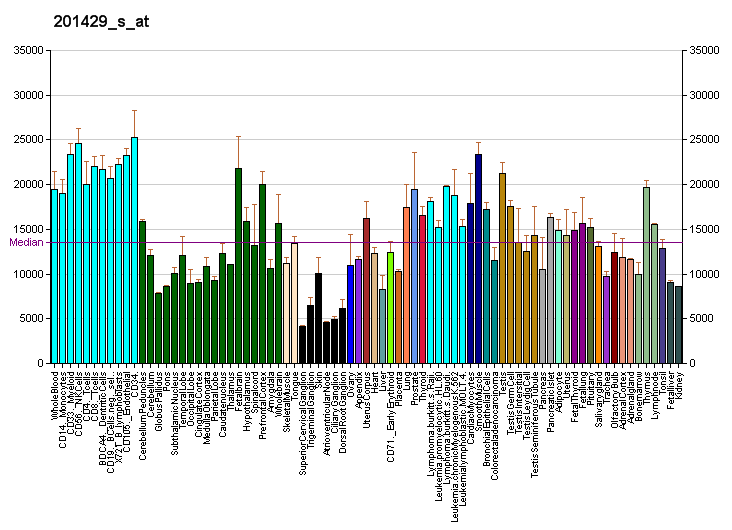
RNA expression pattern
Bgee	Human / Mouse (ortholog); Top expressed in: skin of thigh; lactiferous duct; cerebellar vermis; caput epididymis; parietal pleura; nipple; endothelial cell; superficial temporal artery; pericardium; visceral pleura / Top expressed in: yolk sac; embryo; blastocyst; embryo; morula; ventricular zone; lip; dentate gyrus of hippocampal formation granule cell; superior frontal gyrus; entorhinal cortex; More reference expression data
BioGPS	More reference expression data
Gene ontology
Molecular function	structural constituent of ribosome; metal ion binding; protein binding; RNA binding
Cellular component	cytosol; ribosome; focal adhesion; intracellular anatomical structure; cytosolic large ribosomal subunit; extracellular exosome; nucleus
Biological process	viral transcription; SRP-dependent cotranslational protein targeting to membrane; translational initiation; nuclear-transcribed mRNA catabolic process, nonsense-mediated decay; protein biosynthesis; rRNA processing
Sources:Amigo / QuickGO
Orthologs
Databases	NCBI: entry; OMA: entry
Species	Human	Mouse
Entrez	6168	19981
Ensembl	ENSG00000197756	ENSMUSG00000046330
UniProt	P61513	P61514
RefSeq (mRNA)	NM_000998	NM_009084
RefSeq (protein)	NP_000989	NP_033110
Location (UCSC)	Chr 2: 216.5 – 216.58 Mb	Chr 1: 72.75 – 72.75 Mb
PubMed search
- Wikidata
View/Edit Human	View/Edit Mouse

60S ribosomal protein L37a is a protein that in humans is encoded by the RPL37A gene.

Ribosomes, the organelles that catalyze protein synthesis, consist of a small 40S subunit and a large 60S subunit. Together these subunits are composed of 4 RNA species and approximately 80 structurally distinct proteins. This gene encodes a ribosomal protein that is a component of the 60S subunit. The protein belongs to the L37AE family of ribosomal proteins. It is located in the cytoplasm. The protein contains a C4-type zinc finger-like domain. As is typical for genes encoding ribosomal proteins, there are multiple processed pseudogenes of this gene dispersed through the genome.
