= 60S ribosomal protein L23 =

Protein found in humans

RPL23

Identifiers
- Aliases: RPL23, L23, rpL17, ribosomal protein L23
- External IDs: OMIM: 603662; MGI: 1929455; GeneCards: RPL23
Available structures
PDB	Ortholog search: PDBe RCSB
PDB	List of PDB id codes 3J7R, 4V5Z, 4V6X, 4UJD, 3J7P, 4D67, 3J92, 4D5Y, 5AJ0, 3J7Q, 4UG0, 4UJE, 3J7O, 4UJC

Gene location (Human)
Chr.	Chromosome 17 (human)
Band	17q12	Start	38,847,860 bp
Band	17q12	End	38,853,764 bp

Gene location (Mouse)
Chr.	Chromosome 11 (mouse)
Band	11 D|11 61.1 cM	Start	97,668,353 bp
Band	11 D|11 61.1 cM	End	97,673,263 bp
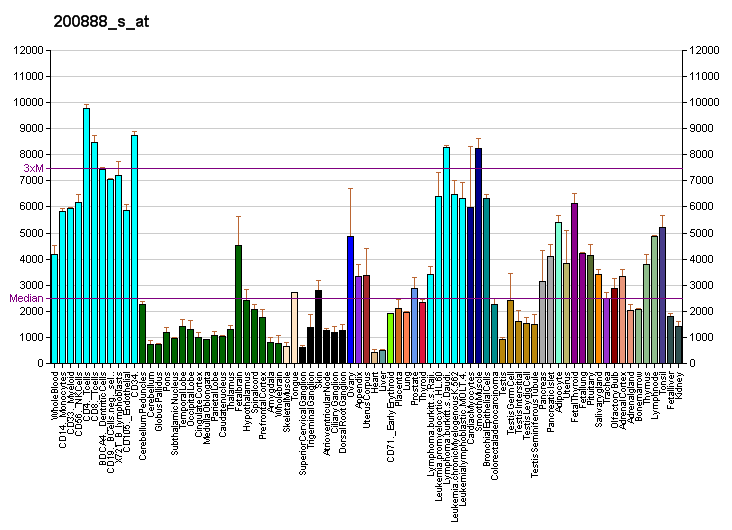

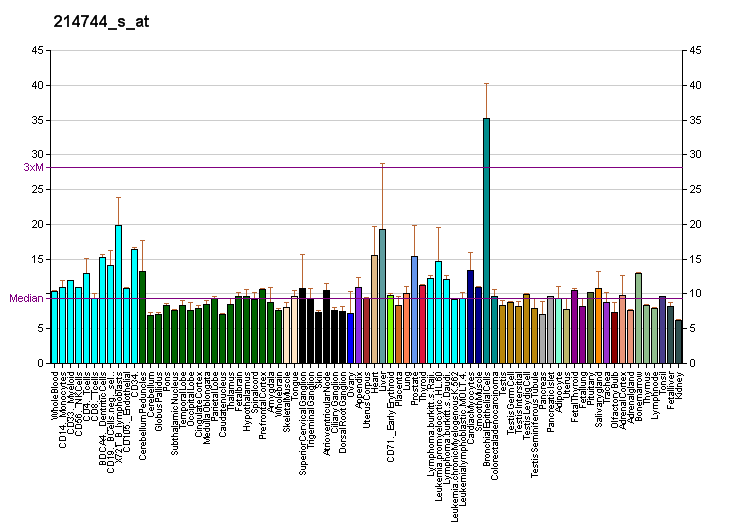
RNA expression pattern
Bgee	Human / Mouse (ortholog); Top expressed in: ganglionic eminence; left ovary; right ovary; ventricular zone; right uterine tube; monocyte; canal of the cervix; body of uterus; right lung; left adrenal cortex / Top expressed in: yolk sac; embryo; embryo; ventricular zone; lip; morula; blastocyst; neural layer of retina; muscle of thigh; dentate gyrus of hippocampal formation granule cell; More reference expression data
BioGPS	More reference expression data
Gene ontology
Molecular function	structural constituent of ribosome; large ribosomal subunit rRNA binding; protein binding; RNA binding; transcription coactivator binding; ubiquitin protein ligase binding; ubiquitin ligase inhibitor activity
Cellular component	cytosol; ribosome; membrane; focal adhesion; extracellular exosome; cytosolic large ribosomal subunit; extracellular matrix; nucleoplasm; cytoplasm; nucleolus; postsynaptic density; protein-containing complex
Biological process	ribosomal protein import into nucleus; viral transcription; SRP-dependent cotranslational protein targeting to membrane; translational initiation; nuclear-transcribed mRNA catabolic process, nonsense-mediated decay; protein biosynthesis; rRNA processing; negative regulation of transcription by RNA polymerase II; positive regulation of cell population proliferation; positive regulation of gene expression; protein-DNA complex disassembly; positive regulation of transcription by RNA polymerase II; protein stabilization; cellular response to actinomycin D; positive regulation of signal transduction by p53 class mediator; negative regulation of ubiquitin protein ligase activity; negative regulation of ubiquitin-dependent protein catabolic process
Sources:Amigo / QuickGO
Orthologs
Databases	NCBI: entry; OMA: entry
Species	Human	Mouse
Entrez	9349	65019
Ensembl	ENSG00000125691	ENSMUSG00000071415
UniProt	P62829	P62830
RefSeq (mRNA)	NM_000978	NM_022891
RefSeq (protein)	NP_000969	NP_075029
Location (UCSC)	Chr 17: 38.85 – 38.85 Mb	Chr 11: 97.67 – 97.67 Mb
PubMed search
- Wikidata
View/Edit Human	View/Edit Mouse

Large ribosomal subunit protein uL14 is a protein that in humans is encoded by the RPL23 gene.

Ribosomes, the organelles that catalyze protein synthesis, consist of a small 40S subunit and a large 60S subunit. Together these subunits are composed of 4 RNA species and approximately 80 structurally distinct proteins. This gene encodes a ribosomal protein that is a component of the 60S subunit. The protein belongs to the universal ribosomal protein uL14 family. It is located in the cytoplasm. This gene has been referred to as RPL17 because the encoded protein shares amino acid identity with ribosomal protein L17 from Saccharomyces cerevisiae; however, its official symbol is RPL23. As is typical for genes encoding ribosomal proteins, there are multiple processed pseudogenes of this gene dispersed through the genome.
