= 60S ribosomal protein L31 =

Protein found in humans

RPL31

Identifiers
- Aliases: RPL31, L31, ribosomal protein L31
- External IDs: OMIM: 617415; MGI: 2149632; GeneCards: RPL31

Gene location (Human)
Chr.	Chromosome 2 (human)
Band	2q11.2	Start	101,002,229 bp
Band	2q11.2	End	101,024,032 bp

Gene location (Mouse)
Chr.	Chromosome 1 (mouse)
Band	1|1 B	Start	39,406,923 bp
Band	1|1 B	End	39,410,992 bp
RNA expression pattern
Bgee	Human / Mouse (ortholog); Top expressed in: skin of thigh; skin of hip; caput epididymis; tail of epididymis; trabecular bone; vulva; tendon of biceps brachii; mucosa of sigmoid colon; corpus epididymis; germinal epithelium / Top expressed in: ventricular zone; yolk sac; embryo; embryo; tail of embryo; superior frontal gyrus; dentate gyrus of hippocampal formation granule cell; genital tubercle; primary visual cortex; lip; More reference expression data
BioGPS	n/a
Gene ontology
Molecular function	structural constituent of ribosome
Cellular component	ribosome; intracellular anatomical structure
Biological process	protein biosynthesis
Sources:Amigo / QuickGO
Orthologs
Databases	NCBI: entry; OMA: entry
Species	Human	Mouse
Entrez	6160	114641
Ensembl	ENSG00000071082	ENSMUSG00000073702
UniProt	H7C2W9	P62900
RefSeq (mRNA)	NM_001099693; NM_000993; NM_001098577	NM_001252218; NM_001252219; NM_053257
RefSeq (protein)	n/a	NP_001239147; NP_001239148; NP_444487
Location (UCSC)	Chr 2: 101 – 101.02 Mb	Chr 1: 39.41 – 39.41 Mb
PubMed search
- Wikidata
View/Edit Human	View/Edit Mouse

60S ribosomal protein L31 is a protein that in humans is encoded by the RPL31 gene.

== Function ==
Ribosomes, the organelles that catalyze protein synthesis, consist of a small 40S subunit and a large 60S subunit. Together these subunits are composed of 4 RNA species and approximately 80 structurally distinct proteins. This gene encodes a ribosomal protein that is a component of the 60S subunit. The protein belongs to the L31E family of ribosomal proteins. It is located in the cytoplasm. Higher levels of expression of this gene in familial adenomatous polyps compared to matched normal tissues have been observed. As is typical for genes encoding ribosomal proteins, there are multiple processed pseudogenes of this gene dispersed through the genome.

== Interactions ==
RPL31 has been shown to interact with BRCA1.
