= 60S ribosomal protein L35a =

Protein found in humans

RPL35A

Identifiers
- Aliases: RPL35A, DBA5, L35A, ribosomal protein L35a, eL33
- External IDs: OMIM: 180468; MGI: 1928894; GeneCards: RPL35A
Available structures
PDB	Ortholog search: PDBe RCSB
PDB	List of PDB id codes 4UG0, 4V6X, 5AJ0, 3J92, 4UJC, 3J7P, 4UJE, 3J7Q, 3J7R, 4D67, 4UJD, 4D5Y, 3J7O

Gene location (Human)
Chr.	Chromosome 3 (human)
Band	3q29	Start	197,950,190 bp
Band	3q29	End	197,956,610 bp

Gene location (Mouse)
Chr.	Chromosome 16 (mouse)
Band	16|16 B3	Start	32,876,823 bp
Band	16|16 B3	End	32,880,559 bp
RNA expression pattern
Bgee	Human / Mouse (ortholog); Top expressed in: tendon of biceps brachii; left ovary; skin of hip; right ovary; ganglionic eminence; canal of the cervix; endothelial cell; monocyte; right uterine tube; body of uterus / Top expressed in: thymus; lens; spleen; yolk sac; ventricular zone; lip; bone marrow; ileum; uterus; embryo; More reference expression data
BioGPS	n/a
Gene ontology
Molecular function	protein binding; tRNA binding; RNA binding; structural constituent of ribosome
Cellular component	cytosol; ribosome; membrane; intracellular anatomical structure; cytosolic large ribosomal subunit; extracellular exosome; extracellular matrix
Biological process	viral transcription; SRP-dependent cotranslational protein targeting to membrane; ribosomal large subunit biogenesis; translational initiation; nuclear-transcribed mRNA catabolic process, nonsense-mediated decay; protein biosynthesis; rRNA processing; cytoplasmic translation
Sources:Amigo / QuickGO
Orthologs
Databases	NCBI: entry; OMA: entry
Species	Human	Mouse
Entrez	6165	57808
Ensembl	ENSG00000182899	ENSMUSG00000060636
UniProt	P18077	O55142
RefSeq (mRNA)	NM_000996; NM_001316311	NM_001130484; NM_001130485; NM_021338
RefSeq (protein)	NP_000987; NP_001303240	NP_001123956; NP_001123957; NP_067313
Location (UCSC)	Chr 3: 197.95 – 197.96 Mb	Chr 16: 32.88 – 32.88 Mb
PubMed search
- Wikidata
View/Edit Human	View/Edit Mouse

60S ribosomal protein L35a is a protein that in humans is encoded by the RPL35A gene.

Ribosomes, the organelles that catalyze protein synthesis, consist of a small 40S subunit and a large 60S subunit. Together these subunits are composed of 4 RNA species and approximately 80 structurally distinct proteins. This gene encodes a ribosomal protein that is a component of the 60S subunit. The protein belongs to the L35AE family of ribosomal proteins. It is located in the cytoplasm. The rat protein has been shown to bind to both initiator and elongator tRNAs, and thus, it is located at the P site, or P and A sites, of the ribosome. Although this gene was originally mapped to chromosome 18, it has been established that it is located at 3q29-qter. Transcript variants utilizing alternative transcription initiation sites and alternative polyA signals exist. As is typical for genes encoding ribosomal proteins, there are multiple processed pseudogenes of this gene dispersed through the genome.
