= 60S ribosomal protein L27 =

Protein found in humans

RPL27

Identifiers
- Aliases: RPL27, L27, ribosomal protein L27
- External IDs: OMIM: 607526; MGI: 98036; GeneCards: RPL27
Available structures
PDB	Ortholog search: PDBe RCSB
PDB	List of PDB id codes 4UG0, 4V6X, 5AJ0, 3J7R, 4UJD, 3J7P, 4D67, 3J92, 4D5Y, 3J7Q, 4UJE, 3J7O, 4UJC
Gene ontology
Molecular function	structural constituent of ribosome; RNA binding; protein binding
Cellular component	cytosol; ribosome; membrane; focal adhesion; intracellular anatomical structure; cytosolic large ribosomal subunit; extracellular exosome; nucleus; extracellular matrix; cytoplasm; endoplasmic reticulum; rough endoplasmic reticulum; cytoplasmic side of rough endoplasmic reticulum membrane; ribonucleoprotein complex
Biological process	viral transcription; SRP-dependent cotranslational protein targeting to membrane; translational initiation; nuclear-transcribed mRNA catabolic process, nonsense-mediated decay; protein biosynthesis; rRNA processing; response to aldosterone
Sources:Amigo / QuickGO
Orthologs
Databases	NCBI: entry; OMA: entry
Species	Human	Mouse
Entrez	6155	19942
Ensembl	ENSG00000131469	ENSMUSG00000063316
UniProt	P61353	P61358
RefSeq (mRNA)	NM_000988	NM_011289
RefSeq (protein)	NP_000979; NP_001336850; NP_001336851	NP_035419
Location (UCSC)	n/a	n/a
PubMed search
- Wikidata
View/Edit Human	View/Edit Mouse

60S ribosomal protein L27 is a protein that in humans is encoded by the RPL27 gene.

Ribosomes, the organelles that catalyze protein synthesis, consist of a small 40S subunit and a large 60S subunit. Together these subunits are composed of 4 RNA species and approximately 80 structurally distinct proteins. This gene encodes a ribosomal protein that is a component of the 60S subunit. The protein belongs to the L27E family of ribosomal proteins. It is located in the cytoplasm. As is typical for genes encoding ribosomal proteins, there are multiple processed pseudogenes of this gene dispersed through the genome.
