= 60S ribosomal protein L36 =

Protein found in humans

RPL36

Identifiers
- Aliases: RPL36, L36, ribosomal protein L36
- External IDs: OMIM: 617893; MGI: 3782787; GeneCards: RPL36
Available structures
PDB	Human UniProt search: PDBe RCSB
PDB	List of PDB id codes 4UG0, 4V6X, 5AJ0, 3J7Q, 3J92, 3J7R, 4D5Y, 4UJC, 4UJE, 4D67, 3J7P, 3J7O, 4UJD

Gene location (Human)
Chr.	Chromosome 19 (human)
Band	19p13.3	Start	5,674,947 bp
Band	19p13.3	End	5,691,875 bp
RNA expression pattern
Bgee	Human / Mouse (ortholog); Top expressed in: ganglionic eminence; ventricular zone; left ovary; right ovary; left adrenal cortex; olfactory zone of nasal mucosa; right adrenal gland; skin of abdomen; right uterine tube; skin of leg / n/a; More reference expression data
BioGPS	n/a
Gene ontology
Molecular function	structural constituent of ribosome; RNA binding
Cellular component	cytoplasm; cytosol; ribosome; membrane; intracellular anatomical structure; nucleolus; cytosolic large ribosomal subunit; polysomal ribosome
Biological process	cytoplasmic translation; viral transcription; SRP-dependent cotranslational protein targeting to membrane; translational initiation; nuclear-transcribed mRNA catabolic process, nonsense-mediated decay; protein biosynthesis; rRNA processing
Sources:Amigo / QuickGO
Orthologs
Databases	NCBI: entry; OMA: entry
Species	Human	Mouse
Entrez	25873	100043718
Ensembl	ENSG00000130255	n/a
UniProt	Q9Y3U8	n/a
RefSeq (mRNA)	NM_033643; NM_015414	n/a
RefSeq (protein)	NP_056229; NP_378669	n/a
Location (UCSC)	Chr 19: 5.67 – 5.69 Mb	n/a
PubMed search
- Wikidata
View/Edit Human	View/Edit Mouse

60S ribosomal protein L36 is a protein that in humans is encoded by the RPL36 gene.

Ribosomes, the organelles that catalyze protein synthesis, consist of a small 40S subunit and a large 60S subunit. Together these subunits are composed of four RNA species and approximately 80 structurally distinct proteins. This gene encodes a ribosomal protein that is a component of the 60S subunit. The protein belongs to the L36E family of ribosomal proteins. It is located in the cytoplasm. Transcript variants derived from alternative splicing exist; they encode the same protein. As is typical for genes encoding ribosomal proteins, there are multiple processed pseudogenes of this gene dispersed through the genome.
