= 60S ribosomal protein L3 =

Protein found in humans

RPL3

Identifiers
- Aliases: RPL3, ASC-1, L3, TARBP-B, ribosomal protein L3
- External IDs: OMIM: 604163; MGI: 1351605; GeneCards: RPL3
Available structures
PDB	Ortholog search: PDBe RCSB
PDB	List of PDB id codes 4UG0, 4V6X, 5AJ0

Gene location (Human)
Chr.	Chromosome 22 (human)
Band	22q13.1	Start	39,312,882 bp
Band	22q13.1	End	39,320,389 bp

Gene location (Mouse)
Chr.	Chromosome 15 (mouse)
Band	15|15 E1	Start	79,961,992 bp
Band	15|15 E1	End	79,976,069 bp
RNA expression pattern
Bgee	Human / Mouse (ortholog); Top expressed in: left ovary; right ovary; beta cell; ventricular zone; anterior pituitary; skin of arm; canal of the cervix; stromal cell of endometrium; ganglionic eminence; body of uterus / Top expressed in: ventricular zone; ovary; dentate gyrus of hippocampal formation granule cell; epiblast; hypothalamus; ganglionic eminence; lens; blastocyst; zone of skin; hippocampus proper; More reference expression data
BioGPS	n/a
Gene ontology
Molecular function	protein binding; 5S rRNA binding; RNA binding; structural constituent of ribosome
Cellular component	ribosome; focal adhesion; intracellular anatomical structure; extracellular exosome; nucleolus; nucleus; cytoplasm; cytosolic large ribosomal subunit; cytosol; protein-containing complex; synapse
Biological process	cellular response to interleukin-4; viral transcription; SRP-dependent cotranslational protein targeting to membrane; translational initiation; nuclear-transcribed mRNA catabolic process, nonsense-mediated decay; rRNA processing; ribosomal large subunit assembly; protein biosynthesis
Sources:Amigo / QuickGO
Orthologs
Databases	NCBI: entry; OMA: entry
Species	Human	Mouse
Entrez	6122	27367
Ensembl	ENSG00000100316	ENSMUSG00000060036
UniProt	P39023	P27659
RefSeq (mRNA)	NM_001033853; NM_000967	NM_013762
RefSeq (protein)	NP_000958; NP_001029025	NP_038790
Location (UCSC)	Chr 22: 39.31 – 39.32 Mb	Chr 15: 79.96 – 79.98 Mb
PubMed search
- Wikidata
View/Edit Human	View/Edit Mouse

60S ribosomal protein L3 is a protein that in humans is encoded by the RPL3 gene.

== Function ==
Ribosomes, the complexes that catalyze protein synthesis, consist of a small 40S subunit and a large 60S subunit. Together these subunits are composed of 4 RNA species and approximately 80 structurally distinct proteins. The RPL3 gene encodes a ribosomal protein that is a component of the 60S subunit. The protein belongs to the L3P family of ribosomal proteins and it is located in the cytoplasm. The protein can bind to the HIV-1 TAR mRNA, and it has been suggested that the protein contributes to tat-mediated transactivation. This gene is co-transcribed with several small nucleolar RNA genes, which are located in several of this gene's introns. Alternate transcriptional splice variants, encoding different isoforms, have been characterized. As is typical for genes encoding ribosomal proteins, there are multiple processed pseudogenes of this gene dispersed through the genome.
