= Alpha operon ribosome binding site =

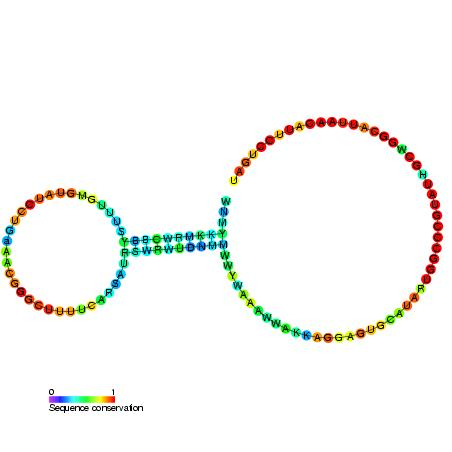
- Predicted secondary structure and sequence conservation of Alpha_RBS

Identifiers
- Symbol: Alpha_RBS
- Rfam: RF00140

Other data
- RNA type: Cis-reg
- Domain(s): Bacteria
- SO: SO:0000233
- PDB structures: PDBe

The alpha operon ribosome binding site in bacteria is surrounded by this complex pseudoknotted RNA structure. Translation of the mRNA produces 4 ribosomal protein products, one of which (S4) acts as a translational repressor by binding to the nested pseudoknot region. The mechanism of repression is thought to involve a conformational switch in the pseudoknot region and ribosome entrapment.
