= 60S ribosomal protein L39 =

Protein found in humans

RPL39

Identifiers
- Aliases: RPL39, L39, RPL39P42, RPL39_23_1806, ribosomal protein L39
- External IDs: OMIM: 300899; MGI: 1914498; GeneCards: RPL39
Available structures
PDB	Ortholog search: PDBe RCSB
PDB	List of PDB id codes 4UG0, 4V6X, 5AJ0, 3J92, 4UJC, 3J7P, 4UJE, 3J7Q, 3J7R, 4D67, 4UJD, 4V5Z, 4D5Y, 3J7O

Gene location (Human)
Chr.	X chromosome (human)
Band	Xq24	Start	119,786,504 bp
Band	Xq24	End	119,791,630 bp

Gene location (Mouse)
Chr.	X chromosome (mouse)
Band	X|X A3.3	Start	36,346,173 bp
Band	X|X A3.3	End	36,349,055 bp
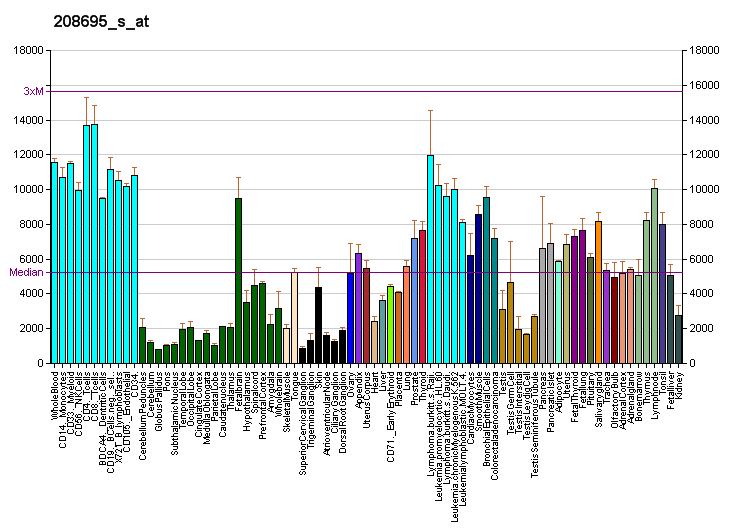
RNA expression pattern
Bgee	Human / Mouse (ortholog); Top expressed in: ganglionic eminence; ventricular zone; endometrium; granulocyte; left ovary; skin of abdomen; skin of leg; lactiferous gland; subcutaneous adipose tissue; right ovary / Top expressed in: yolk sac; ventricular zone; embryo; embryo; ganglionic eminence; lip; esophagus; uterus; duodenum; urinary bladder; More reference expression data
BioGPS	More reference expression data
Gene ontology
Molecular function	RNA binding; structural constituent of ribosome
Cellular component	ribosome; cytosol; intracellular anatomical structure; extracellular space; cytosolic large ribosomal subunit; polysomal ribosome
Biological process	SRP-dependent cotranslational protein targeting to membrane; innate immune response in mucosa; viral transcription; nuclear-transcribed mRNA catabolic process, nonsense-mediated decay; translational initiation; protein biosynthesis; rRNA processing; antimicrobial humoral immune response mediated by antimicrobial peptide; cytoplasmic translation
Sources:Amigo / QuickGO
Orthologs
Databases	NCBI: entry; OMA: entry
Species	Human	Mouse
Entrez	6170	67248
Ensembl	ENSG00000198918	ENSMUSG00000079641
UniProt	P62891	P62892
RefSeq (mRNA)	NM_001000	NM_026055
RefSeq (protein)	NP_000991	NP_080331
Location (UCSC)	Chr X: 119.79 – 119.79 Mb	Chr X: 36.35 – 36.35 Mb
PubMed search
- Wikidata
View/Edit Human	View/Edit Mouse

60S ribosomal protein L39 is a protein that in humans is encoded by the RPL39 gene.

Ribosomes, the organelles that catalyze protein synthesis, consist of a small 40S subunit and a large 60S subunit. Together these subunits are composed of 4 RNA species and approximately 80 structurally distinct proteins. This gene encodes a ribosomal protein that is a component of the 60S subunit. The protein belongs to the S39E family of ribosomal proteins. It is located in the cytoplasm. In rat, the protein is the smallest, and one of the most basic, proteins of the ribosome. This gene is co-transcribed with the U69 small nucleolar RNA gene, which is located in its second intron. As is typical for genes encoding ribosomal proteins, there are multiple processed pseudogenes of this gene dispersed through the genome.
