= 60S ribosomal protein L18 =

Protein found in humans

RPL18

Identifiers
- Aliases: RPL18, L18, ribosomal protein L18, DBA18
- External IDs: OMIM: 604179; MGI: 98003; GeneCards: RPL18
Available structures
PDB	Ortholog search: PDBe RCSB
PDB	List of PDB id codes 4UG0, 4V6X, 5AJ0, 4UJD, 4D67, 4D5Y, 4UJE, 4UJC

Gene location (Human)
Chr.	Chromosome 19 (human)
Band	19q13.33	Start	48,615,328 bp
Band	19q13.33	End	48,619,184 bp

Gene location (Mouse)
Chr.	Chromosome 7 (mouse)
Band	7|7 B3	Start	45,364,881 bp
Band	7|7 B3	End	45,370,260 bp
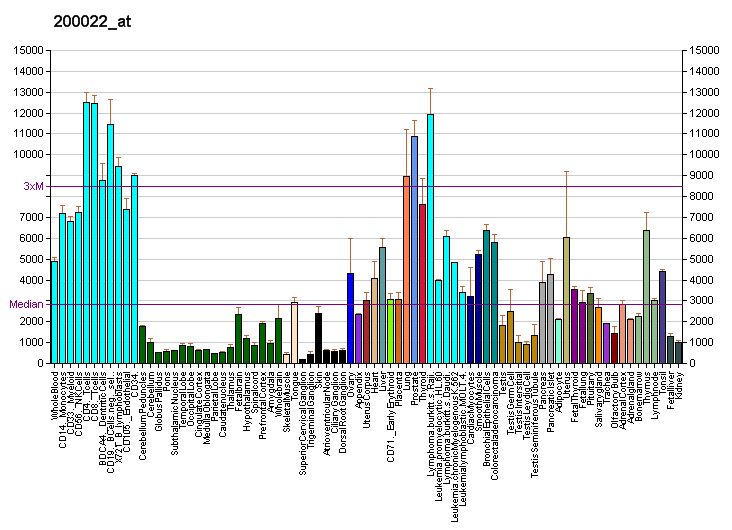
RNA expression pattern
Bgee	Human / Mouse (ortholog); Top expressed in: nipple; human penis; skin of thigh; skin of hip; urethra; right uterine tube; pylorus; vulva; left ovary; skin of arm / Top expressed in: epiblast; urinary bladder; embryo; bone marrow; adrenal gland; yolk sac; embryo; ventricular zone; lip; morula; More reference expression data
BioGPS	More reference expression data
Gene ontology
Molecular function	RNA binding; structural constituent of ribosome
Cellular component	ribosome; membrane; focal adhesion; intracellular anatomical structure; nucleolus; cytosolic large ribosomal subunit; nucleus; cytoplasm; endoplasmic reticulum; cytosol; rough endoplasmic reticulum; polysomal ribosome
Biological process	viral transcription; SRP-dependent cotranslational protein targeting to membrane; translational initiation; nuclear-transcribed mRNA catabolic process, nonsense-mediated decay; rRNA processing; protein biosynthesis; cytoplasmic translation
Sources:Amigo / QuickGO
Orthologs
Databases	NCBI: entry; OMA: entry
Species	Human	Mouse
Entrez	6141	19899
Ensembl	ENSG00000063177	ENSMUSG00000059070
UniProt	Q07020	P35980
RefSeq (mRNA)	NM_000979; NM_001270490	NM_009077
RefSeq (protein)	NP_000970; NP_001257419	NP_033103
Location (UCSC)	Chr 19: 48.62 – 48.62 Mb	Chr 7: 45.36 – 45.37 Mb
PubMed search
- Wikidata
View/Edit Human	View/Edit Mouse

60S ribosomal protein L18 is a protein that in humans is encoded by the RPL18 gene.

Ribosomes, the organelles that catalyze protein synthesis, consist of a small 40S subunit and a large 60S subunit. Together these subunits are composed of 4 RNA species and approximately 80 structurally distinct proteins. This gene encodes a ribosomal protein that is a component of the 60S subunit. The protein belongs to the L18E family of ribosomal proteins. It is located in the cytoplasm. As is typical for genes encoding ribosomal proteins, there are multiple processed pseudogenes of this gene dispersed through the genome.
