= 60S ribosomal protein L32 =

Protein found in humans

RPL32

Identifiers
- Aliases: RPL32, L32, PP9932, ribosomal protein L32
- External IDs: MGI: 3644747; GeneCards: RPL32
Available structures
PDB	Human UniProt search: PDBe RCSB
PDB	List of PDB id codes 4UG0, 4V6X, 5AJ0, 3J7R, 4V5Z, 4UJD, 3J7P, 4D67, 3J92, 4D5Y, 3J7Q, 4UJE, 3J7O, 4UJC

Gene location (Human)
Chr.	Chromosome 3 (human)
Band	3p25.2	Start	12,834,485 bp
Band	3p25.2	End	12,841,582 bp

Gene location (Mouse)
Chr.	Chromosome 10 (mouse)
Band	10|10 A3	Start	20,084,236 bp
Band	10|10 A3	End	20,084,634 bp
RNA expression pattern
Bgee	Human / Mouse (ortholog); Top expressed in: ganglionic eminence; Achilles tendon; left ovary; right ovary; fallopian tube; canal of the cervix; lymph node; skin of leg; skin of abdomen; lactiferous gland / Top expressed in: synovial joint; ankle joint; blastocyst; embryo; embryo; morula; proximal tubule; right kidney; spermatid; spermatocyte; More reference expression data
BioGPS	n/a
Gene ontology
Molecular function	structural constituent of ribosome; RNA binding
Cellular component	cytosol; ribosome; membrane; intracellular anatomical structure; cytosolic large ribosomal subunit; polysomal ribosome
Biological process	viral transcription; SRP-dependent cotranslational protein targeting to membrane; translational initiation; nuclear-transcribed mRNA catabolic process, nonsense-mediated decay; protein biosynthesis; rRNA processing; cellular response to dexamethasone stimulus; liver regeneration; cytoplasmic translation
Sources:Amigo / QuickGO
Orthologs
Databases	NCBI: entry; OMA: entry
Species	Human	Mouse
Entrez	6161	621697
Ensembl	ENSG00000144713	ENSMUSG00000111356
UniProt	P62910	n/a
RefSeq (mRNA)	NM_001007074; NM_000994; NM_001007073	NM_001101561
RefSeq (protein)	NP_000985; NP_001007074; NP_001007075	n/a
Location (UCSC)	Chr 3: 12.83 – 12.84 Mb	Chr 10: 20.08 – 20.08 Mb
PubMed search
- Wikidata
View/Edit Human	View/Edit Mouse

60S ribosomal protein L32 is a protein that in humans is encoded by the RPL32 gene.

Ribosomes, the organelles that catalyze protein synthesis, consist of a small 40S subunit and a large 60S subunit. Together these subunits are composed of 4 RNA species and approximately 80 structurally distinct proteins. This gene encodes a ribosomal protein that is a component of the 60S subunit. The protein belongs to the L32E family of ribosomal proteins. It is located in the cytoplasm. Although some studies have mapped this gene to 3q13.3-q21, it is believed to map to 3p25-p24. As is typical for genes encoding ribosomal proteins, there are multiple processed pseudogenes of this gene dispersed through the genome. Alternatively spliced transcript variants encoding the same protein have been observed for this gene.
