= 60S ribosomal protein L22 =

Protein found in humans

RPL22

Identifiers
- Aliases: RPL22, EAP, HBP15, HBP15/L22, L22, ribosomal protein L22
- External IDs: OMIM: 180474; MGI: 99262; GeneCards: RPL22
Available structures
PDB	Ortholog search: PDBe RCSB
PDB	List of PDB id codes 4UG0, 4V6X, 5AJ0, 4UJD, 4D67, 4D5Y, 4UJE, 4UJC

Gene location (Human)
Chr.	Chromosome 1 (human)
Band	1p36.31	Start	6,185,020 bp
Band	1p36.31	End	6,209,389 bp

Gene location (Mouse)
Chr.	Chromosome 4 (mouse)
Band	4|4 E2	Start	152,410,199 bp
Band	4|4 E2	End	152,418,528 bp
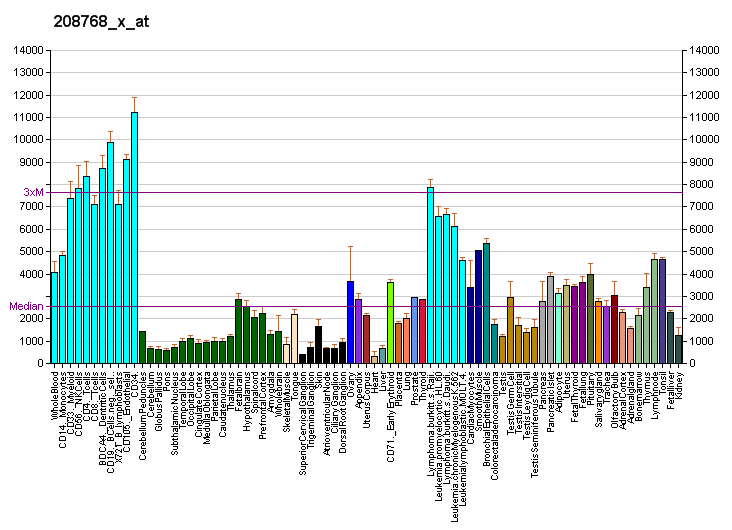

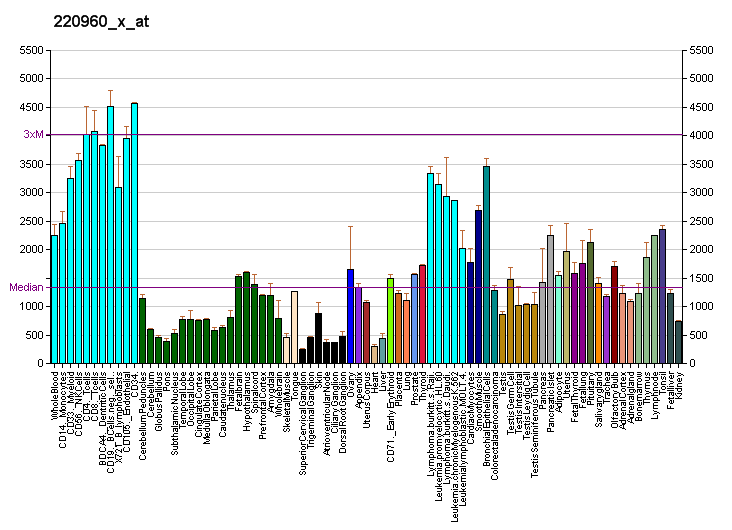

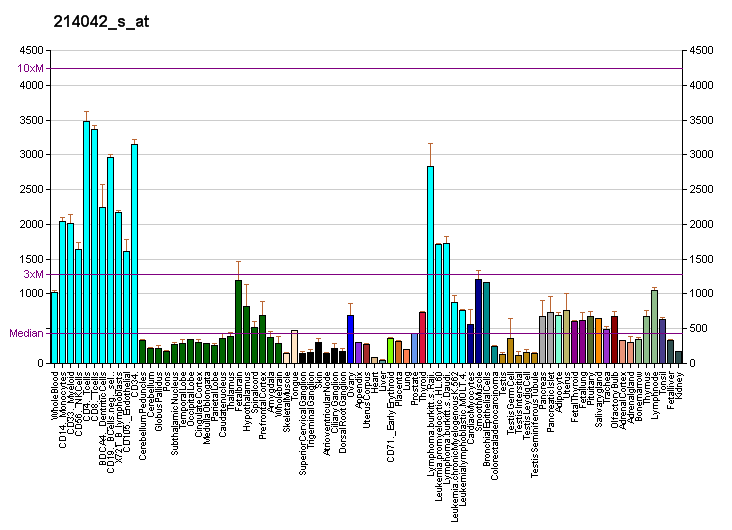
RNA expression pattern
Bgee	Human / Mouse (ortholog); Top expressed in: Achilles tendon; ganglionic eminence; left ovary; monocyte; ventricular zone; right ovary; canal of the cervix; body of uterus; skin of abdomen; granulocyte / Top expressed in: transitional epithelium of urinary bladder; medial ganglionic eminence; dermis; endothelial cell of lymphatic vessel; efferent ductule; endocardial cushion; maxillary prominence; mandibular prominence; migratory enteric neural crest cell; skin of abdomen; More reference expression data
BioGPS	More reference expression data
Gene ontology
Molecular function	heparin binding; protein binding; structural constituent of ribosome; RNA binding; translation regulator activity
Cellular component	cytoplasm; cytosol; ribosome; focal adhesion; intracellular anatomical structure; cytosolic large ribosomal subunit; extracellular exosome; nucleus; extracellular matrix; ribonucleoprotein complex; presynapse; glutamatergic synapse
Biological process	cytoplasmic translation; protein biosynthesis; viral transcription; SRP-dependent cotranslational protein targeting to membrane; translational initiation; nuclear-transcribed mRNA catabolic process, nonsense-mediated decay; rRNA processing; alpha-beta T cell differentiation; regulation of translation at presynapse, modulating synaptic transmission
Sources:Amigo / QuickGO
Orthologs
Databases	NCBI: entry; OMA: entry
Species	Human	Mouse
Entrez	6146	19934
Ensembl	ENSG00000116251	ENSMUSG00000028936
UniProt	P35268	P67984
RefSeq (mRNA)	NM_000983	NM_001277113; NM_001277114; NM_009079
RefSeq (protein)	NP_000974	NP_001264042; NP_001264043; NP_033105
Location (UCSC)	Chr 1: 6.19 – 6.21 Mb	Chr 4: 152.41 – 152.42 Mb
PubMed search
- Wikidata
View/Edit Human	View/Edit Mouse

60S ribosomal protein L22 is a protein that in humans is encoded by the RPL22 gene on Chromosome 1.

== Function ==
Ribosomes, the organelles that catalyze protein synthesis, consist of a small 40S subunit and a large 60S subunit. Together these subunits are composed of 4 RNA species and approximately 80 structurally distinct proteins. This gene encodes a cytoplasmic ribosomal protein that is a component of the 60S subunit. The protein belongs to the L22E family of ribosomal proteins. Its initiating methionine residue is post-translationally removed. The protein can bind specifically to Epstein–Barr virus-encoded small RNA (EBER) 1. The mouse protein has been shown to be capable of binding to heparin. Transcript variants utilizing alternative polyA signals exist. As is typical for genes encoding ribosomal proteins, there are multiple processed pseudogenes of this gene dispersed through the genome. It was previously thought that this gene mapped to 3q26 and that it was fused to the acute myeloid leukemia 1 (AML1) gene located at 21q22 in some therapy-related myelodysplastic syndrome patients with 3;21 translocations; however, these fusions actually involve a ribosomal protein L22 pseudogene located at 3q26, and this gene actually maps to 1p36.3-p36.2.

== Insects ==
The gene may play a role in Insect toxicity resistance. In culex mosquitos, it was one of several ribosomal proteins which were overexpressed in strains resistant to the insecticide deltamethrin. More focused analysis revealed that resistant mosquitoes expressed RPL22 at a level more than 2.5x higher than susceptible strains; however, the same study found that over-expression of RPL22 in transfected cells caused a down-regulation of a different deltamethrin-resistance gene (CYP6A1) and made these cells overall less resistant to the insecticide.
