= 60S ribosomal protein L17 =

Protein found in humans

RPL17

Identifiers
- Aliases: RPL17, L17, PD-1, RPL23, ribosomal protein L17
- External IDs: OMIM: 603661; MGI: 2448270; GeneCards: RPL17
Available structures
| PDB | Ortholog search: PDBe RCSB |
| PDB | List of PDB id codes 4UG0, 4V6X, 5AJ0, 4V5Z, 4UJD, 5A8L, 4D67, 3J92, 4D5Y, 4UJE, 4UJC |

Gene location (Human)
| Chr. | Chromosome 18 (human) |
| Band | 18q21.1 | Start | 49,488,453 bp |
| Band | 18q21.1 | End | 49,492,523 bp |

Gene location (Mouse)
| Chr. | Chromosome 18 (mouse) |
| Band | 18|18 E3 | Start | 75,131,629 bp |
| Band | 18|18 E3 | End | 75,136,452 bp |
RNA expression pattern
| Bgee | Human / Mouse (ortholog); Top expressed in: left ovary; right ovary; right uterine tube; endometrium; anterior pituitary; body of uterus; Achilles tendon; left lobe of thyroid gland; body of pancreas; canal of the cervix / Top expressed in: uterus; ventricular zone; epiblast; spleen; thymus; ganglionic eminence; lens; zone of skin; pancreas; bone marrow; More reference expression data |
| BioGPS | n/a |
Gene ontology
| Molecular function | protein binding; structural constituent of ribosome; RNA binding |
| Cellular component | cytosol; ribosome; large ribosomal subunit; intracellular anatomical structure; cytosolic large ribosomal subunit; nucleus |
| Biological process | viral transcription; SRP-dependent cotranslational protein targeting to membrane; translational initiation; nuclear-transcribed mRNA catabolic process, nonsense-mediated decay; rRNA processing; protein biosynthesis; cytoplasmic translation |
Sources:Amigo / QuickGO
Orthologs
| Databases | NCBI: entry; OMA: entry |
| Species | Human | Mouse |
| Entrez | 6139 | 319195 |
| Ensembl | ENSG00000265681 | ENSMUSG00000062328 |
| UniProt | P18621 | Q9CPR4; Q6ZWZ7 |
| RefSeq (mRNA) | NM_001199345; NM_000985; NM_001035006; NM_001199340; NM_001199341 NM_001199342; NM_001199343; NM_001199344 | NM_001002239 |
| RefSeq (protein) | NP_000976; NP_001030178; NP_001186269; NP_001186270; NP_001186271 NP_001186272; NP_001186273; NP_001186274; NP_001356484; NP_001356485; NP_001356486; NP_001356487; NP_001356489; NP_001356490; NP_001356491; NP_001356492 | NP_001002239; NP_001392893; NP_001392894; NP_001392895 |
| Location (UCSC) | Chr 18: 49.49 – 49.49 Mb | Chr 18: 75.13 – 75.14 Mb |
| PubMed search |
- Wikidata
| View/Edit Human | View/Edit Mouse |

Large ribosomal subunit protein uL22 is a protein that in humans is encoded by the RPL17 gene.

Ribosomes, the organelles that catalyze protein synthesis, consist of a small 40S subunit and a large 60S subunit. Together these subunits are composed of 4 RNA species and approximately 80 structurally distinct proteins. This gene encodes a ribosomal protein that is a component of the 60S subunit. The protein belongs to the L22P family of ribosomal proteins. It is located in the cytoplasm. This gene has been referred to as RPL23 because the encoded protein shares amino acid identity with ribosomal protein L23 from Haloarcula marismortui; however, its official symbol is RPL17. Two alternative splice variants have been observed, each encoding the same protein. As is typical for genes encoding ribosomal proteins, there are multiple processed pseudogenes of this gene dispersed through the genome.

== See also ==
- Mitochondrial ribosomal protein L22, another human protein of uL22 (L22p or L17e) family
