= 60S ribosomal protein L34 =

Protein found in humans

RPL34

Identifiers
- Aliases: RPL34, L34, ribosomal protein L34
- External IDs: OMIM: 616862; MGI: 3648994; GeneCards: RPL34
Available structures
PDB	Human UniProt search: PDBe RCSB
PDB	List of PDB id codes 4UG0, 4V6X, 5AJ0, 3J7R, 4UJD, 3J7P, 4D67, 3J92, 4D5Y, 3J7Q, 4UJE, 3J7O, 4UJC

Gene location (Human)
Chr.	Chromosome 4 (human)
Band	4q25	Start	108,620,569 bp
Band	4q25	End	108,630,412 bp
RNA expression pattern
Bgee	Human / Mouse (ortholog); Top expressed in: caput epididymis; skin of arm; corpus epididymis; Achilles tendon; cartilage tissue; lactiferous duct; tail of epididymis; optic nerve; mucosa of urinary bladder; skin of thigh / n/a; More reference expression data
BioGPS	n/a
Gene ontology
Molecular function	RNA binding; structural constituent of ribosome; cadherin binding
Cellular component	cytosol; ribosome; intracellular anatomical structure; mitochondrion; cytosolic large ribosomal subunit; extracellular exosome; cytoplasm; endoplasmic reticulum
Biological process	ribosome biogenesis; viral transcription; SRP-dependent cotranslational protein targeting to membrane; translational initiation; nuclear-transcribed mRNA catabolic process, nonsense-mediated decay; rRNA processing; protein biosynthesis
Sources:Amigo / QuickGO
Orthologs
Databases	NCBI: entry; OMA: entry
Species	Human	Mouse
Entrez	6164	623174
Ensembl	ENSG00000109475	ENSMUSG00000061669
UniProt	P49207	n/a
RefSeq (mRNA)	NM_000995; NM_033625; NM_001319232; NM_001319234; NM_001319235 NM_001319236	n/a
RefSeq (protein)	NP_000986; NP_001306161; NP_001306163; NP_001306164; NP_001306165 NP_296374	n/a
Location (UCSC)	Chr 4: 108.62 – 108.63 Mb	n/a
PubMed search
- Wikidata
View/Edit Human	View/Edit Mouse

60S ribosomal protein L34 is a protein that in humans is encoded by the RPL34 gene.

== Function ==
Ribosomes, the organelles that catalyze protein synthesis, consist of a small 40S subunit and a large 60S subunit. Together these subunits are composed of 4 RNA species and approximately 80 structurally distinct proteins. This gene encodes a ribosomal protein that is a component of the 60S subunit. The protein belongs to the L34E family of ribosomal proteins. It is located in the cytoplasm. This gene originally was thought to be located at 17q21, but it has been mapped to 4q. Transcript variants derived from alternative splicing, alternative transcription initiation sites, and/or alternative polyadenylation exist; these variants encode the same protein. As is typical for genes encoding ribosomal proteins, there are multiple processed pseudogenes of this gene dispersed through the genome.
