= RPL36AL =

Protein-coding gene in the species Homo sapiens

Identifiers
- Aliases: RPL36AL, RPL36A, ribosomal protein L36a like, RPL36A_18_1363, RPL36AP42
- External IDs: OMIM: 180469; MGI: 1913733; GeneCards: RPL36AL
Available structures
PDB	Ortholog search: PDBe RCSB
PDB	List of PDB id codes 4UG0, 4V6X, 5AJ0

Gene location (Human)
Chr.	Chromosome 14 (human)
Band	14q21.3	Start	49,618,530 bp
Band	14q21.3	End	49,620,626 bp

Gene location (Mouse)
Chr.	Chromosome 12 (mouse)
Band	12|12 C2	Start	69,229,505 bp
Band	12|12 C2	End	69,230,857 bp
RNA expression pattern
Bgee	Human / Mouse (ortholog); Top expressed in: germinal epithelium; epithelium of nasopharynx; tendon of biceps brachii; amniotic fluid; seminal vesicula; body of pancreas; trabecular bone; left ovary; islet of Langerhans; caput epididymis / Top expressed in: yolk sac; islet of Langerhans; embryo; lens; primary oocyte; stomach; embryo; epiblast; thymus; ileum; More reference expression data
BioGPS	n/a
Gene ontology
Molecular function	structural constituent of ribosome; protein binding
Cellular component	cytoplasm; ribosome; intracellular anatomical structure; nucleus; cytosol; plasma membrane; cytosolic large ribosomal subunit; endoplasmic reticulum
Biological process	protein biosynthesis
Sources:Amigo / QuickGO
Orthologs
Databases	NCBI: entry; OMA: entry
Species	Human	Mouse
Entrez	6166	66483
Ensembl	ENSG00000165502	ENSMUSG00000049751
UniProt	Q969Q0	P83882
RefSeq (mRNA)	NM_001001	NM_025589
RefSeq (protein)	NP_000992	NP_079865; NP_063918
Location (UCSC)	Chr 14: 49.62 – 49.62 Mb	Chr 12: 69.23 – 69.23 Mb
PubMed search
- Wikidata
View/Edit Human	View/Edit Mouse

Ribosomal protein L36a like is a protein that in humans is encoded by the RPL36AL gene.

== Function ==
Cytoplasmic ribosomes, organelles that catalyze protein synthesis, consist of a small 40S subunit and a large 60S subunit. Together these subunits are composed of 4 RNA species and approximately 80 structurally distinct proteins. This gene encodes a ribosomal protein that is a component of the 60S subunit. The protein, which shares sequence similarity with yeast ribosomal protein L44, belongs to the L44E (L36AE) family of ribosomal proteins. This gene and the human gene officially named ribosomal protein L36a (RPL36A) encode nearly identical proteins; however, they are distinct genes. Although the name of this gene has been referred to as ribosomal protein L36a (RPL36A), its official name is ribosomal protein L36a-like (RPL36AL). As is typical for genes encoding ribosomal proteins, there are multiple processed pseudogenes of this gene dispersed through the genome. [provided by RefSeq, Jul 2008].
