= 60S ribosomal protein L38 =

Protein found in humans

RPL38

Identifiers
- Aliases: RPL38, L38, ribosomal protein L38
- External IDs: OMIM: 604182; MGI: 1914921; GeneCards: RPL38
Available structures
| PDB | Ortholog search: PDBe RCSB |
| PDB | List of PDB id codes 4V6X, 5AJ0, 4UG0, 3J7R, 4UJD, 3J7P, 4D67, 3J92, 4D5Y, 3J7Q, 4UJE, 3J7O, 4UJC |

Gene location (Human)
| Chr. | Chromosome 17 (human) |
| Band | 17q25.1 | Start | 74,203,582 bp |
| Band | 17q25.1 | End | 74,210,655 bp |

Gene location (Mouse)
| Chr. | Chromosome 11 (mouse) |
| Band | 11 79.82 cM|11 E2 | Start | 114,559,350 bp |
| Band | 11 79.82 cM|11 E2 | End | 114,563,157 bp |
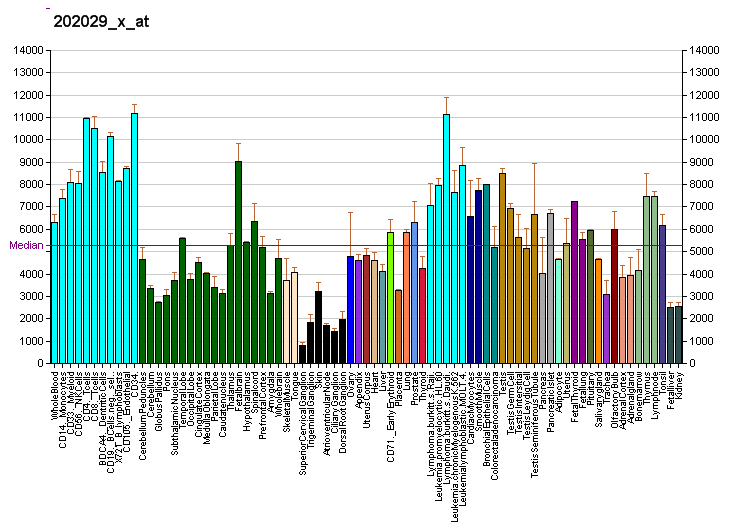
RNA expression pattern
| Bgee | Human / Mouse (ortholog); Top expressed in: Achilles tendon; olfactory bulb; left testis; right testis; vena cava; thymus; internal globus pallidus; middle frontal gyrus; skin of thigh; beta cell / Top expressed in: yolk sac; striatum of neuraxis; adrenal gland; urinary bladder; islet of Langerhans; superior frontal gyrus; bone marrow; embryo; cerebellar cortex; lens; More reference expression data |
| BioGPS | More reference expression data |
Gene ontology
| Molecular function | RNA binding; structural constituent of ribosome |
| Cellular component | ribosome; cytosol; focal adhesion; intracellular anatomical structure; eukaryotic 80S initiation complex; cytosolic large ribosomal subunit; postsynaptic density; polysomal ribosome; synapse |
| Biological process | SRP-dependent cotranslational protein targeting to membrane; viral transcription; regulation of translation; middle ear morphogenesis; skeletal system development; nuclear-transcribed mRNA catabolic process, nonsense-mediated decay; hearing; 90S preribosome assembly; axial mesoderm development; translational initiation; ossification; rRNA processing; protein biosynthesis; ribonucleoprotein complex assembly; cytoplasmic translation |
Sources:Amigo / QuickGO
Orthologs
| Databases | NCBI: entry; OMA: entry |
| Species | Human | Mouse |
| Entrez | 6169 | 67671 |
| Ensembl | ENSG00000172809 | ENSMUSG00000057322 |
| UniProt | P63173 | Q9JJI8 |
| RefSeq (mRNA) | NM_001035258; NM_000999 | NM_001048057; NM_001048058; NM_023372; NM_001362918 |
| RefSeq (protein) | NP_000990; NP_001030335 | NP_001041522; NP_001041523; NP_075861; NP_001349847 |
| Location (UCSC) | Chr 17: 74.2 – 74.21 Mb | Chr 11: 114.56 – 114.56 Mb |
| PubMed search |
- Wikidata
| View/Edit Human | View/Edit Mouse |

60S ribosomal protein L38 is a protein that in humans is encoded by the RPL38 gene.

== Gene ==
The human RPL38 gene resides on the long arm of chromosome 17 at 17q25.1. It consists of five exons spread out over a distance of 6223 bp. The 213 nucleotide open reading frame encodes a 70 amino acid protein. Alternative splice variants have been identified, both encoding the same protein. As is typical for genes encoding ribosomal proteins, there are multiple processed pseudogenes of this gene dispersed through the genome, including one located in the promoter region of the angiotensin II receptor type 1 gene.

== Function ==
Ribosomes, the organelles that catalyze protein synthesis, consist of a small 40S subunit and a large 60S subunit. Together these subunits are composed of 4 rRNA species and approximately 80 structurally distinct proteins. This gene encodes a ribosomal protein that is a component of the 60S subunit. The protein belongs to the L38E family of ribosomal proteins. It is located in the cytoplasm.

== Clinical significance ==
In humans, mutations in ribosomal proteins cause Diamond-Blackfan Anemia. However, no disease has yet been linked to mutations in human RPL38.

== Mutations in animals ==
An ~18 kb deletion encompassing the entire Rpl38 locus underlies the phenotype of the Tail-short (Ts) mutant mouse. In the homozygous state, Ts mice die at approximately 3–4 days of gestation. Ts/+ heterozygous embryos develop anemia and exhibit skeletal malformations. During the perinatal period, about 30% of heterozygotes die. The surviving Ts/+ mice display a wide range of tail abnormalities, including shortened, kinked, and malformed tails. They also weigh less than their wild-type littermates but otherwise have a normal lifespan. Additionally, Ts mice develop conductive hearing loss shortly after the onset of hearing at around 3–4 weeks of age. This hearing loss results from ectopic ossification along the round window ridge outside the cochlea, massive deposition of cholesterol crystals in the middle ear cavity, an enlarged Eustachian tube, and chronic otitis media with effusion.

In Drosophila melanogaster, loss-of-function alleles of Rpl38 cause embryonic lethality in homozygotes and protracted growth and shortened bristles in heterozygotes. Owing to the haploinsufficient nature of the mutation, the phenotype is inherited as a dominant trait.
