= 60S ribosomal protein L35 =

Protein found in humans

RPL35

Identifiers
- Aliases: RPL35, L35, ribosomal protein L35, DBA19
- External IDs: OMIM: 618315; MGI: 1913739; GeneCards: RPL35
Available structures
PDB	Ortholog search: PDBe RCSB
PDB	List of PDB id codes 4UG0, 4V6X, 5AJ0, 4V5Z, 4UJD, 4D67, 4D5Y, 4UJE, 4UJC

Gene location (Human)
Chr.	Chromosome 9 (human)
Band	9q33.3	Start	124,857,880 bp
Band	9q33.3	End	124,861,981 bp

Gene location (Mouse)
Chr.	Chromosome 2 (mouse)
Band	2|2 B	Start	38,891,592 bp
Band	2|2 B	End	38,895,636 bp
RNA expression pattern
Bgee	Human / Mouse (ortholog); Top expressed in: skin of abdomen; skin of leg; skin of thigh; anterior pituitary; right testis; olfactory zone of nasal mucosa; left testis; left ovary; right uterine tube; skin of hip / Top expressed in: urinary bladder; ovary; genital tubercle; embryo; neural tube; embryo; adrenal gland; placenta; white adipose tissue; bone marrow; More reference expression data
BioGPS	n/a
Gene ontology
Molecular function	mRNA binding; RNA binding; structural constituent of ribosome
Cellular component	cytosol; ribosome; membrane; intracellular anatomical structure; nucleolus; cytosolic large ribosomal subunit
Biological process	viral transcription; SRP-dependent cotranslational protein targeting to membrane; maturation of LSU-rRNA from tricistronic rRNA transcript (SSU-rRNA, 5.8S rRNA, LSU-rRNA); translational initiation; nuclear-transcribed mRNA catabolic process, nonsense-mediated decay; rRNA processing; protein biosynthesis
Sources:Amigo / QuickGO
Orthologs
Databases	NCBI: entry; OMA: entry
Species	Human	Mouse
Entrez	11224	66489
Ensembl	ENSG00000136942	ENSMUSG00000062997
UniProt	P42766	Q6ZWV7
RefSeq (mRNA)	NM_007209	NM_025592
RefSeq (protein)	NP_009140	NP_079868
Location (UCSC)	Chr 9: 124.86 – 124.86 Mb	Chr 2: 38.89 – 38.9 Mb
PubMed search
- Wikidata
View/Edit Human	View/Edit Mouse

60S ribosomal protein L35 is a protein that in humans is encoded by the RPL35 gene.

== Function ==
Ribosomes, the organelles that catalyze protein synthesis, consist of a small 40S subunit and a large 60S subunit. Together these subunits are composed of 4 RNA species and approximately 80 structurally distinct proteins. This gene encodes a ribosomal protein that is a component of the 60S subunit. The protein belongs to the L29P family of ribosomal proteins. It is located in the cytoplasm. As is typical for genes encoding ribosomal proteins, there are multiple processed pseudogenes of this gene dispersed through the genome.
