= 60S ribosomal protein L24 =

Protein found in humans

RPL24

Identifiers
- Aliases: RPL24, HEL-S-310, L24, ribosomal protein L24
- External IDs: OMIM: 604180; MGI: 1915443; GeneCards: RPL24
Available structures
PDB	Ortholog search: PDBe RCSB
PDB	List of PDB id codes 4UG0, 4V6X, 5A2Q, 5AJ0

Gene location (Human)
Chr.	Chromosome 3 (human)
Band	3q12.3	Start	101,681,091 bp
Band	3q12.3	End	101,686,718 bp

Gene location (Mouse)
Chr.	Chromosome 16 (mouse)
Band	16 C1.1|16 33.74 cM	Start	55,786,638 bp
Band	16 C1.1|16 33.74 cM	End	55,791,798 bp
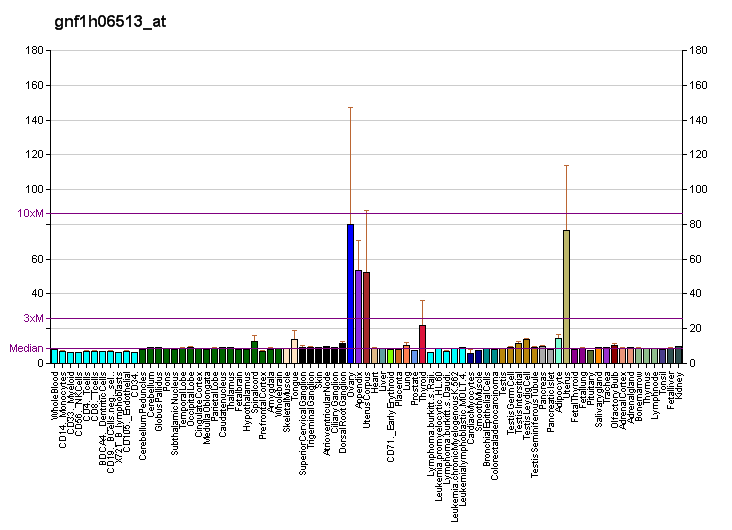

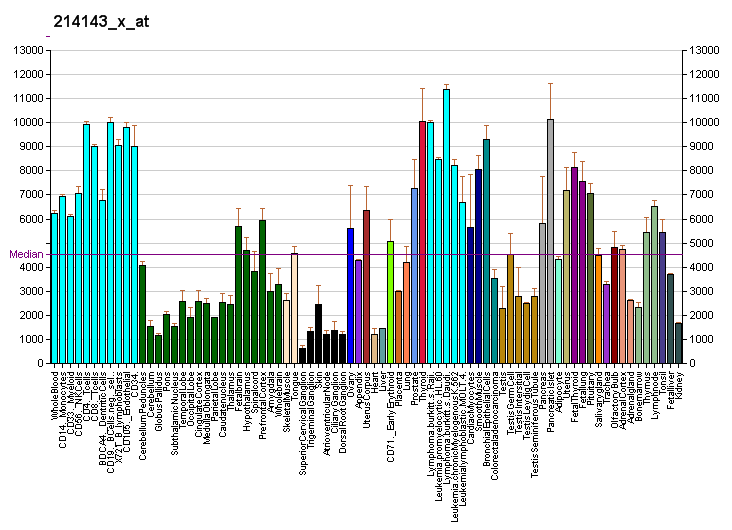
RNA expression pattern
Bgee	Human / Mouse (ortholog); Top expressed in: Achilles tendon; anterior pituitary; ganglionic eminence; left ovary; islet of Langerhans; thyroid gland; corpus callosum; left lobe of thyroid gland; cerebellar hemisphere; canal of the cervix / Top expressed in: embryo; epiblast; embryo; morula; ventricular zone; urinary bladder; ganglionic eminence; uterus; blastocyst; thymus; More reference expression data
BioGPS	More reference expression data
Gene ontology
Molecular function	protein binding; structural constituent of ribosome; cadherin binding; RNA binding
Cellular component	cytoplasm; cytosol; ribosome; membrane; cytosolic large ribosomal subunit; extracellular exosome; endoplasmic reticulum; polysomal ribosome; synapse
Biological process	assembly of large subunit precursor of preribosome; viral transcription; mitotic cell cycle checkpoint signaling; exit from mitosis; SRP-dependent cotranslational protein targeting to membrane; retina development in camera-type eye; ribosomal large subunit assembly; translational initiation; nuclear-transcribed mRNA catabolic process, nonsense-mediated decay; optic nerve development; retinal ganglion cell axon guidance; rRNA processing; protein biosynthesis; cytoplasmic translation
Sources:Amigo / QuickGO
Orthologs
Databases	NCBI: entry; OMA: entry
Species	Human	Mouse
Entrez	6152	68193
Ensembl	ENSG00000114391	ENSMUSG00000098274
UniProt	P83731	Q8BP67
RefSeq (mRNA)	NM_000986	NM_024218
RefSeq (protein)	NP_000977	NP_077180
Location (UCSC)	Chr 3: 101.68 – 101.69 Mb	Chr 16: 55.79 – 55.79 Mb
PubMed search
- Wikidata
View/Edit Human	View/Edit Mouse

60S ribosomal protein L24 is a protein that in humans is encoded by the RPL24 gene.

Ribosomes, the organelles that catalyze protein synthesis, consist of a small 40S subunit and a large 60S subunit. Together these subunits are composed of 4 RNA species and approximately 80 structurally distinct proteins. This gene encodes a ribosomal protein that is a component of the 60S subunit. The protein belongs to the L24E family of ribosomal proteins. It is located in the cytoplasm. This gene has been referred to as ribosomal protein L30 because the encoded protein shares amino acid identity with the L30 ribosomal proteins from Saccharomyces cerevisiae; however, its official name is ribosomal protein L24. As is typical for genes encoding ribosomal proteins, there are multiple processed pseudogenes of this gene dispersed through the genome.
