= 60S ribosomal protein L37 =

Protein found in humans

RPL37

Identifiers
- Aliases: RPL37, L37, ribosomal protein L37
- External IDs: OMIM: 604181; MGI: 1914531; GeneCards: RPL37
Available structures
PDB	Ortholog search: PDBe RCSB
PDB	List of PDB id codes 4UG0, 4V6X, 5AJ0, 4D67, 4UJC, 4D5Y, 4UJE, 4UJD, 4V5Z

Gene location (Human)
Chr.	Chromosome 5 (human)
Band	5p13.1	Start	40,825,262 bp
Band	5p13.1	End	40,835,222 bp

Gene location (Mouse)
Chr.	Chromosome 15 (mouse)
Band	15|15 A1	Start	5,146,127 bp
Band	15|15 A1	End	5,148,622 bp
RNA expression pattern
Bgee	Human / Mouse (ortholog); Top expressed in: germinal epithelium; nipple; urethra; human penis; parietal pleura; pylorus; palpebral conjunctiva; caput epididymis; mucosa of sigmoid colon; visceral pleura / Top expressed in: embryo; embryo; lip; ventricular zone; dentate gyrus of hippocampal formation granule cell; yolk sac; primary visual cortex; superior frontal gyrus; granulocyte; muscle of thigh; More reference expression data
BioGPS	n/a
Gene ontology
Molecular function	metal ion binding; rRNA binding; structural constituent of ribosome; RNA binding
Cellular component	ribosome; cytosol; intracellular anatomical structure; cytosolic large ribosomal subunit; synapse
Biological process	SRP-dependent cotranslational protein targeting to membrane; viral transcription; nuclear-transcribed mRNA catabolic process, nonsense-mediated decay; translational initiation; protein biosynthesis; rRNA processing
Sources:Amigo / QuickGO
Orthologs
Databases	NCBI: entry; OMA: entry
Species	Human	Mouse
Entrez	6167	67281
Ensembl	ENSG00000145592	ENSMUSG00000041841
UniProt	P61927	Q9D823
RefSeq (mRNA)	NM_000997	NM_026069
RefSeq (protein)	NP_000988	NP_080345
Location (UCSC)	Chr 5: 40.83 – 40.84 Mb	Chr 15: 5.15 – 5.15 Mb
PubMed search
- Wikidata
View/Edit Human	View/Edit Mouse

60S ribosomal protein L37 is a protein that in humans is encoded by the RPL37 gene.

Ribosomes, the organelles that catalyze protein synthesis, consist of a small 40S subunit and a large 60S subunit. Together these subunits are composed of 4 RNA species and approximately 80 structurally distinct proteins. This gene encodes a ribosomal protein that is a component of the 60S subunit. The protein belongs to the L37E family of ribosomal proteins. It is located in the cytoplasm. The protein contains a C2C2-type zinc finger-like motif. As is typical for genes encoding ribosomal proteins, there are multiple processed pseudogenes of this gene dispersed through the genome.
