= 60S ribosomal protein L30 =

Protein found in humans

RPL30

Identifiers
- Aliases: RPL30, L30, ribosomal protein L30
- External IDs: OMIM: 180467; MGI: 98037; GeneCards: RPL30
Available structures
PDB	Ortholog search: PDBe RCSB
PDB	List of PDB id codes 3VI6, 4UG0, 4V6X, 5AJ0, 3J92, 4UJC, 3J7P, 4UJE, 3J7Q, 3J7R, 4D67, 4UJD, 4V5Z, 4D5Y, 3J7O

Gene location (Human)
Chr.	Chromosome 8 (human)
Band	8q22.2	Start	98,024,851 bp
Band	8q22.2	End	98,046,469 bp

Gene location (Mouse)
Chr.	Chromosome 15 (mouse)
Band	15 B3.1|15 14.33 cM	Start	34,440,651 bp
Band	15 B3.1|15 14.33 cM	End	34,443,786 bp
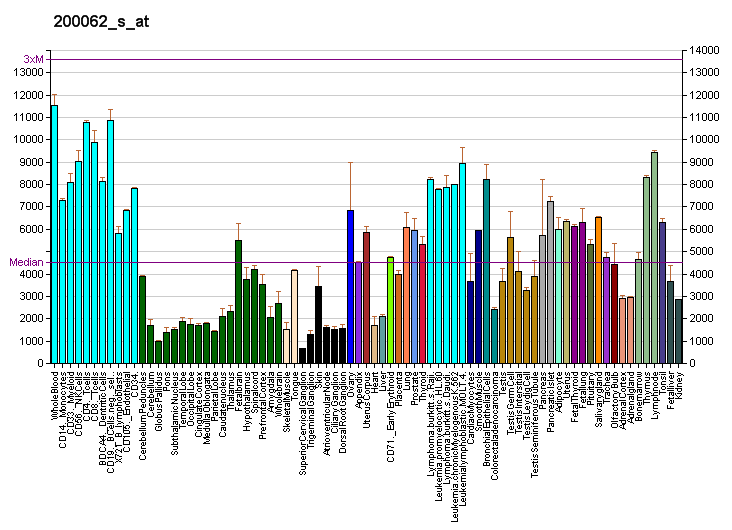
RNA expression pattern
Bgee	Human / Mouse (ortholog); Top expressed in: parietal pleura; urethra; skin of hip; germinal epithelium; left ovary; skin of thigh; secondary oocyte; lactiferous duct; right ovary; caput epididymis / Top expressed in: ventricular zone; yolk sac; neural layer of retina; embryo; embryo; lip; morula; blastocyst; dentate gyrus of hippocampal formation granule cell; muscle of thigh; More reference expression data
BioGPS	More reference expression data
Gene ontology
Molecular function	structural constituent of ribosome; protein binding; RNA binding; selenocysteine insertion sequence binding
Cellular component	cytosol; ribosome; membrane; focal adhesion; intracellular anatomical structure; extracellular exosome; nucleus; extracellular matrix; cytosolic large ribosomal subunit; postsynaptic density; polysomal ribosome
Biological process	protein biosynthesis; viral transcription; SRP-dependent cotranslational protein targeting to membrane; translational initiation; nuclear-transcribed mRNA catabolic process, nonsense-mediated decay; rRNA processing; antimicrobial humoral immune response mediated by antimicrobial peptide; cytoplasmic translation; liver regeneration; positive regulation of selenocysteine incorporation
Sources:Amigo / QuickGO
Orthologs
Databases	NCBI: entry; OMA: entry
Species	Human	Mouse
Entrez	6156	19946
Ensembl	ENSG00000156482	ENSMUSG00000058600
UniProt	P62888	P62889
RefSeq (mRNA)	NM_000989	NM_001163485; NM_009083
RefSeq (protein)	NP_000980	NP_001156957; NP_033109
Location (UCSC)	Chr 8: 98.02 – 98.05 Mb	Chr 15: 34.44 – 34.44 Mb
PubMed search
- Wikidata
View/Edit Human	View/Edit Mouse

60S ribosomal protein L30 is a protein that in humans is encoded by the RPL30 gene.

Ribosomes, the organelles that catalyze protein synthesis, consist of a small 40S subunit and a large 60S subunit. Together these subunits are composed of 4 RNA species and approximately 80 structurally distinct proteins. This gene encodes a ribosomal protein that is a component of the 60S subunit. The protein belongs to the L30E family of ribosomal proteins. It is located in the cytoplasm. This gene is co-transcribed with the U72 small nucleolar RNA gene, which is located in its fourth intron. As is typical for genes encoding ribosomal proteins, there are multiple processed pseudogenes of this gene dispersed through the genome.
