= Eukaryotic large ribosomal subunit (60S) =

Eukaryotic large ribosomal subunit

The eukaryotic large ribosomal subunit (60S) is denoted according to its sedimentation coefficients in Svedberg units. The 60S subunit is the large subunit of the eukaryotic ribosome (S80), with the other major component being the eukaryotic small ribosomal subunit (40S). It is structurally and functionally related to the 50S subunit of 70S prokaryotic ribosomes. However, the 60S subunit is much larger than the prokaryotic 50S subunit and contains many additional protein segments, as well as ribosomal RNA expansion segments.

== Overall structure ==
Characteristic features of the large subunit, shown below in the "Crown View", include the central protuberance (CP) and the two stalks, which are named according to their bacterial protein components (L1 stalk on the left as seen from the subunit interface and L7/L12 on the right). There are three binding sites for tRNA, the A-site, P-site and E-site (see article on protein translation for details). The core of the 60S subunit is formed by the 28S ribosomal RNA (abbreviated 28S rRNA), which is homologous to the prokaryotic 23S rRNA, which also contributes the active site (peptidyl transferase center, PTC) of the ribosome. The rRNA core is decorated with dozens of proteins. In the figure "Crystal Structure of the Eukaryotic 60S Ribosomal Subunit from T. thermophila", the ribosomal RNA core is represented as a grey tube and expansion segments are shown in red. Proteins which have homologs in eukaryotes, archaea and bacteria are shown as blue ribbons. Proteins shared only between eukaryotes and archaea are shown as orange ribbons and proteins specific to eukaryotes are shown as red ribbons.

Crystal Structure of the Eukaryotic 60S Ribosomal Subunit from T. thermophila
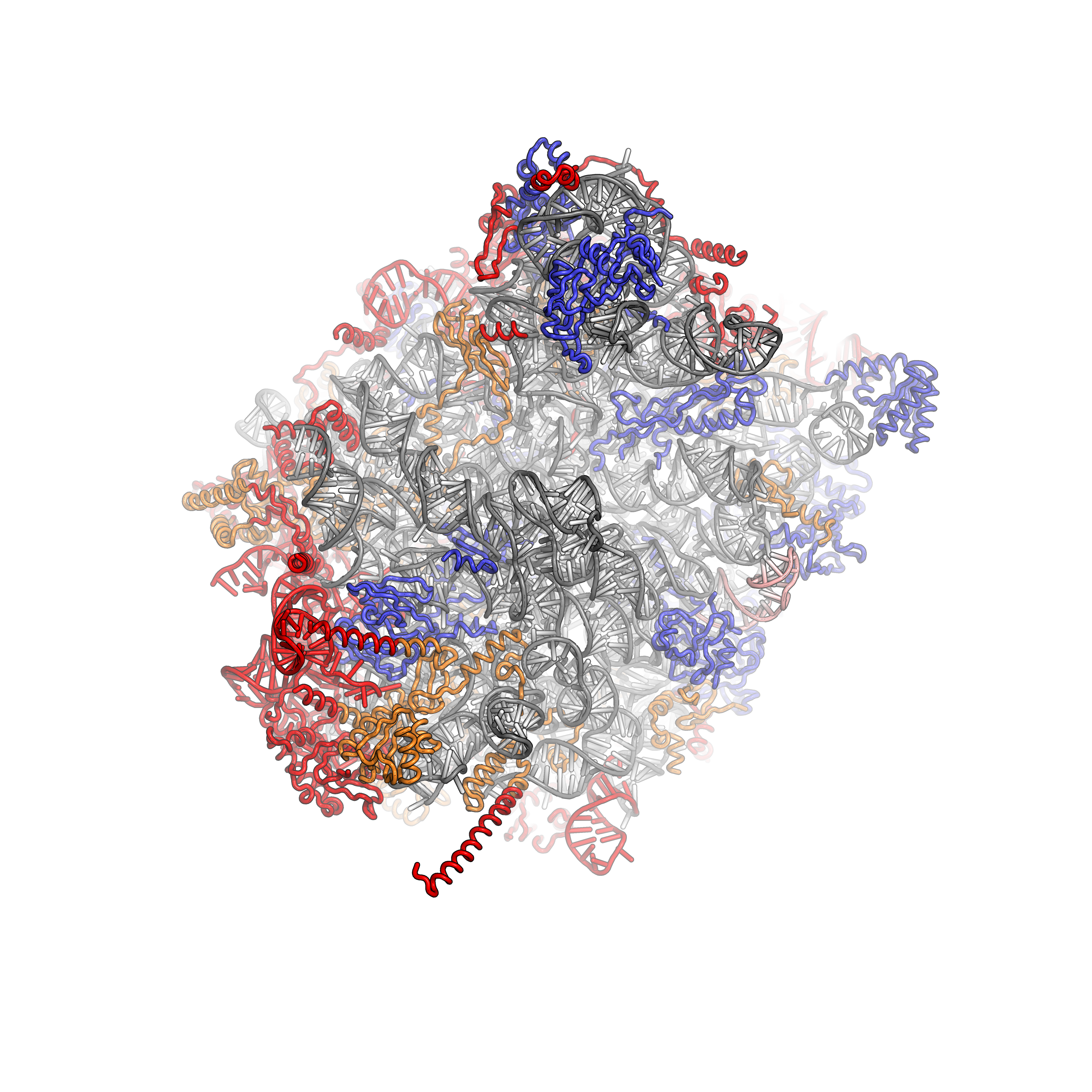
60S subunit viewed from the subunit interface side, PDB identifiers 4A17, 4A19

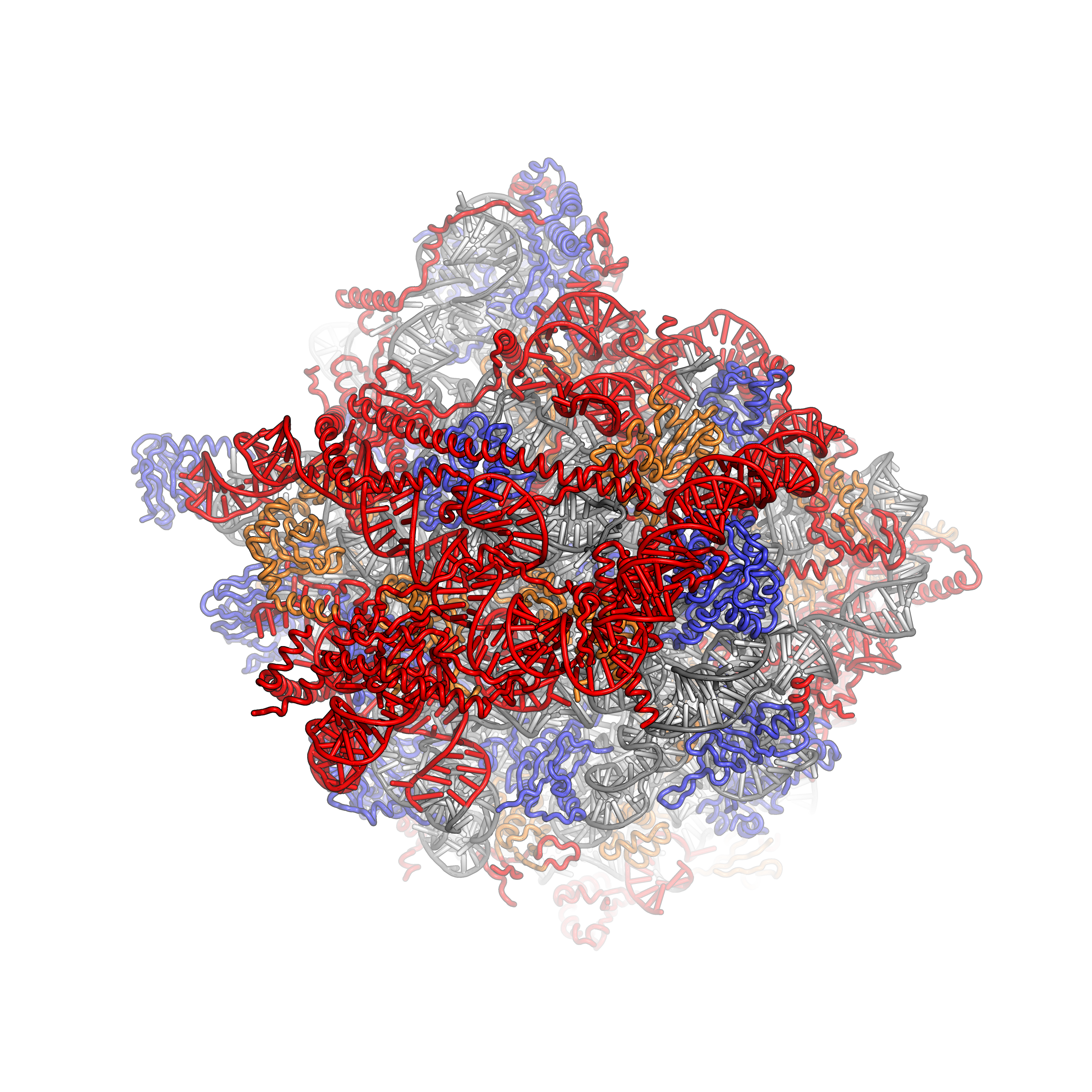
60S subunit viewed from the solvent-exposed side, PDB identifiers 4A17, 4A19

== 60S ribosomal proteins ==
The table "60S ribosomal proteins" shows the individual protein folds of the 60S subunit colored by conservation as above. The eukaryote-specific extensions, ranging from a few residues or loops to very long alpha helices and additional domains, are highlighted in red.

Historically, different nomenclatures have been used for ribosomal proteins. For instance, proteins have been numbered according to their migration properties in gel electrophoresis experiments. Therefore, different names may refer to homologous proteins from different organisms, while identical names do not necessarily denote homologous proteins. The table "60S ribosomal proteins" cross-references the human ribosomal protein names with yeast, bacterial, and archaeal homologs. Further information can be found in the ribosomal protein gene database (RPG).

60S ribosomal proteins
Structure (Eukaryotic)	H. sapiens	Universal name	Amino acids	Conservation	S. cerevisiae	Bacterial homolog (E. coli)	Archaeal homolog
	RPLP0	uL10	318	EAB	P0	L10	L10
	RPL3	uL3	404	EAB	L3	L3	L3
	RPL4	uL4	428	EAB	L4	L4	L4
	RPL5	uL18	298	EAB	L5	L18	L18p
	RPL6	eL6	289	E	L6	n/a	n/a
	RPL7	uL30	254	EAB	L7	L30	L30
	RPL7A	eL8	267	EA	L8	n/a	L7Ae
	RPL8	uL2	258	EAB	L2	L2	L2
	RPL9	uL6	193	EAB	L9	L6	L6
	RPL10	uL16	215	EAB	L10	L16	L10e
	RPL11	uL5		EAB	L11	L5	L5
	RPL13	eL13		EA	L13	n/a	L13e
	RPL13A	uL13	204	EAB	L16	L13	L13
	RPL14	eL14	221	EA	L14	n/a	L14e
	RPL15	eL15	205	EA	L15	n/a	L15e
	RPL17	uL22	185	EAB	L17	L22	L22
	RPL18	eL18	189	EA	L18	n/a	L18e
	RPL18A	eL20	177	EA	L20	n/a	Lx
	RPL19	eL19	197	EA	L19	n/a	L19
	RPL21	eL21	161	EA	L21	n/a	L21e
	RPL22, RPL22L1	eL22	129	E	L22	n/a	n/a
	RPL23	uL14	141	EAB	L23	L14	L14p
	RPL23A	uL23	157	EAB	L25	L23	L23
	RPL24	eL24	158	EA	L24	n/a	L24e
	RPL26	uL24	146	EAB	L26	L24	L24
	RPL27	eL27	137	E	L27	n/a	n/a
	RPL27A	uL15	149	EAB	L28	L15	L15
	RPL28	eL28		E	n/a	n/a	n/a
	RPL29	eL29		E	L29	n/a	n/a
	RPL30	eL30	116	EA	L30	n/a	L30e
	RPL31	eL31	126	EA	L31	n/a	L31e
	RPL32	eL32	136	EA	L32	n/a	L32e
	RPL34	eL34	118	EA	L34	n/a	L34e
	RPL35	uL29	124	EAB	L35	L29	L29
	RPL35A	eL33		EA	L33	n/a	L35Ae
	RPL36	eL36	106	E	L36	n/a	n/a
	RPL36A	eL42	107	EA	L42	n/a	L44e
	RPL37	eL37	98	EA	L37	n/a	L37e
	RPL37A	eL43		EA	L43	n/a	L37Ae
	RPL38	eL38		EA	L38	n/a	L38e
	RPL39	eL39	52	EA	L39	n/a	L37Ae
	RPL40	eL40	129	EA	L40	n/a	L40e
