= Gene family =

Set of several similar genes

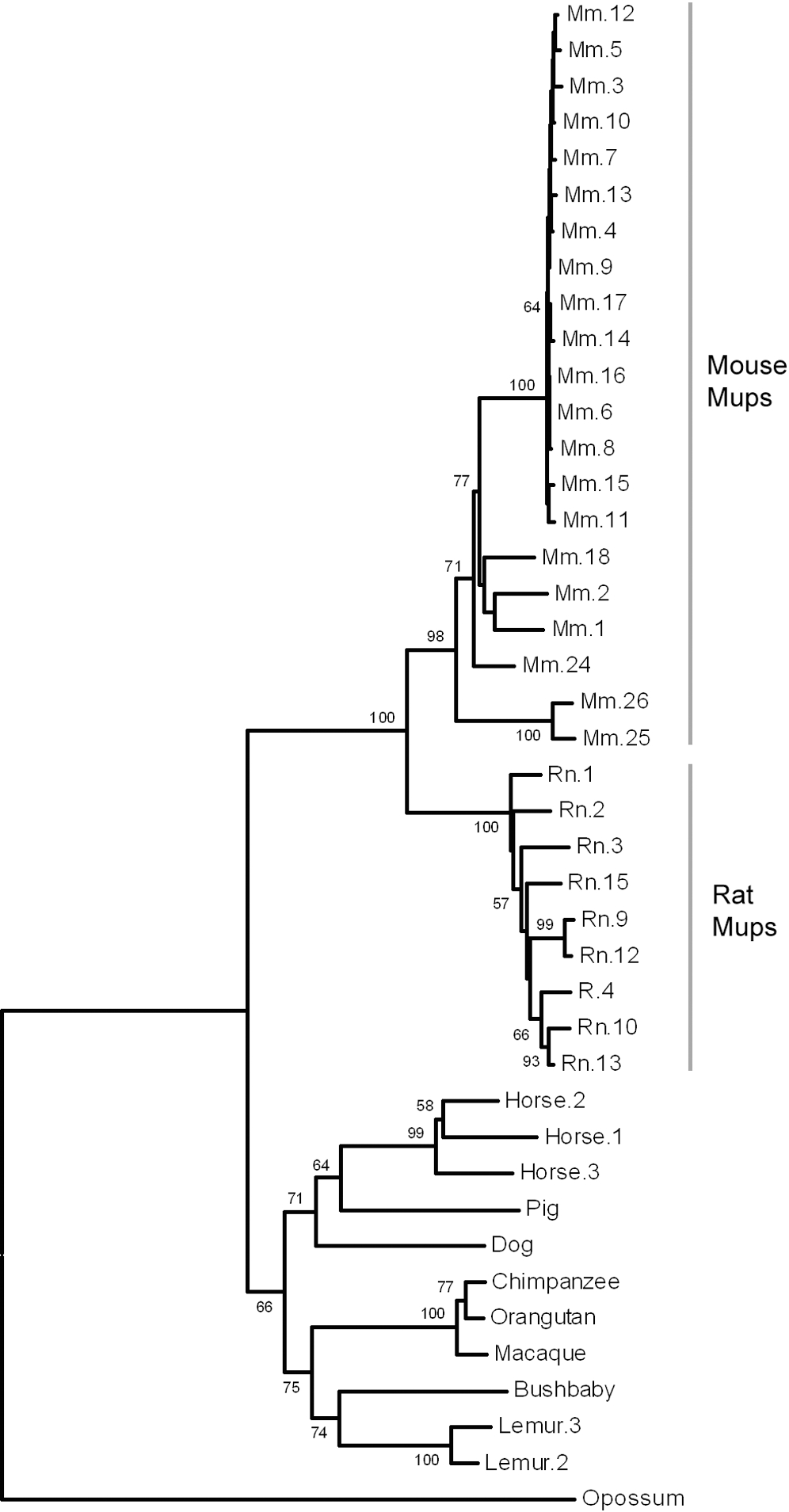
Phylogenetic tree of the Mup gene family

A gene family is a set of several similar genes, formed by duplication of a single original gene, and generally with similar biochemical functions. One such family are the genes for human hemoglobin subunits; the ten genes are in two clusters on different chromosomes, called the α-globin and β-globin loci. These two gene clusters are thought to have arisen as a result of a precursor gene being duplicated approximately 500 million years ago.

Genes are categorized into families based on shared nucleotide or protein sequences. Phylogenetic techniques can be used as a more rigorous test. The positions of exons within the coding sequence can be used to infer common ancestry. Knowing the sequence of the protein encoded by a gene can allow researchers to apply methods that find similarities among protein sequences that provide more information than similarities or differences among DNA sequences.

If the genes of a gene family encode proteins, the term protein family is often used in an analogous manner to gene family.

The expansion or contraction of gene families along a specific lineage can be due to chance, or can be the result of natural selection. To distinguish between these two cases is often difficult in practice. Recent work uses a combination of statistical models and algorithmic techniques to detect gene families that are under the effect of natural selection.

The HUGO Gene Nomenclature Committee (HGNC) creates nomenclature schemes using a "stem" (or "root") symbol for members of a gene family (by homology or function), with a hierarchical numbering system to distinguish the individual members. For example, for the peroxiredoxin family, PRDX is the root symbol, and the family members are PRDX1, PRDX2, PRDX3, PRDX4, PRDX5, and PRDX6.

== Basic structure ==
Gene phylogeny as lines within grey species phylogeny. Top: An ancestral gene duplication produces two paralogs (histone H1.1 and 1.2). A speciation event produces orthologs in the two daughter species (human and chimpanzee). Bottom: in a separate species (E. coli), a gene has a similar function (histone-like nucleoid-structuring protein) but has a separate evolutionary origin and so is an analog.

One level of genome organization is the grouping of genes into several gene families. Gene families are groups of related genes that share a common ancestor. Members of gene families may be paralogs or orthologs. Gene paralogs are genes with similar sequences from within the same species while gene orthologs are genes with similar sequences in different species. Gene families are highly variable in size, sequence diversity, and arrangement. Depending on the diversity and functions of the genes within the family, families can be classified as multigene families or superfamilies.

Multigene families typically consist of members with similar sequences and functions, though a high degree of divergence (at the sequence and/or functional level) does not lead to the removal of a gene from a gene family. Individual genes in the family may be arranged close together on the same chromosome or dispersed throughout the genome on different chromosomes. Due to the similarity of their sequences and their overlapping functions, individual genes in the family often share regulatory control elements. In some instances, gene members have identical (or nearly identical) sequences. Such families allow for massive amounts of gene product to be expressed in a short time as needed. Other families allow for similar but specific products to be expressed in different cell types or at different stages of an organism's development.

Superfamilies are much larger than single multigene families. Superfamilies contain up to hundreds of genes, including multiple multigene families as well as single, individual gene members. The large number of members allows superfamilies to be widely dispersed with some genes clustered and some spread far apart. The genes are diverse in sequence and function displaying various levels of expression and separate regulation controls.

Some gene families also contain pseudogenes, sequences of DNA that closely resemble established gene sequences but are non-functional. Different types of pseudogenes exist. Non-processed pseudogenes are genes that acquired mutations over time becoming non-functional. Processed pseudogenes are genes that have lost their function after being moved around the genome by retrotransposition. Pseudogenes that have become isolated from the gene family they originated in, are referred to as orphans.

== Formation ==
Gene families arose from multiple duplications of an ancestral gene, followed by mutation and divergence. Duplications can occur within a lineage (e.g., humans might have two copies of a gene that is found only once in chimpanzees) or they are the result of speciation. For example, a single gene in the ancestor of humans and chimpanzees now occurs in both species and can be thought of as having been 'duplicated' via speciation. As a result of duplication by speciation, a gene family might include 15 genes, one copy in each of 15 different species.

=== Duplication ===
In the formation of gene families, four levels of duplication exist: 1) exon duplication and shuffling, 2) entire gene duplication, 3) multigene family duplication, and 4) whole genome duplication. Exon duplication and shuffling gives rise to variation and new genes. Genes are then duplicated to form multigene families which duplicate to form superfamilies spanning multiple chromosomes. Whole genome duplication doubles the number of copies of every gene and gene family. Whole genome duplication or polyploidization can be either autopolyploidization or alloploidization. Autopolyploidization is the duplication of the same genome and allopolyploidization is the duplication of two closely related genomes or hybridized genomes from different species.

Duplication occurs primarily through uneven crossing over events in meiosis of germ cells. (1,2) When two chromosomes misalign, crossing over - the exchange of gene alleles - results in one chromosome expanding or increasing in gene number and the other contracting or decreasing in gene number. The expansion of a gene cluster is the duplication of genes that leads to larger gene families.

=== Relocation ===
Gene members of a multigene family or multigene families within superfamilies exist on different chromosomes due to relocation of those genes after duplication of the ancestral gene. Transposable elements play a role in the movement of genes. Transposable elements are recognized by inverted repeats at their 5' and 3' ends. When two transposable elements are close enough in the same region on a chromosome, they can form a composite transposon. The protein transposase recognizes the outermost inverted repeats, cutting the DNA segment. Any genes between the two transposable elements are relocated as the composite transposon jumps to a new area of the genome.

Reverse transcription is another method of gene movement. An mRNA transcript of a gene is reversed transcribed, or copied, back into DNA. This new DNA copy of the mRNA is integrated into another part of the genome, resulting in gene family members being dispersed.

A special type of multigene family is implicated in the movement of gene families and gene family members. LINE (Long INterspersed Elements) and SINE (Short INterspersed Elements) families are highly repetitive DNA sequences spread all throughout the genome. The LINEs contain a sequence that encodes a reverse transcriptase protein. This protein aids in copying the RNA transcripts of LINEs and SINEs back into DNA, and integrates them into different areas of the genome. This self-perpetuates the growth of LINE and SINE families. Due to the highly repetitive nature of these elements, LINEs and SINEs when close together also trigger unequal crossing over events which result in single-gene duplications and the formation of gene families.

=== Divergence ===
Non-synonymous mutations resulting in the substitution of amino acids, increase in duplicate gene copies. Duplication gives rise to multiple copies of the same gene, giving a level of redundancy where mutations are tolerated. With one functioning copy of the gene, other copies are able to acquire mutations without being extremely detrimental to the organisms. Mutations allow duplicate genes to acquire new or different functions.

=== Concerted evolution ===
Some multigene families are extremely homogenous, with individual genes members sharing identical or almost identical sequences. The process by which gene families maintain high homogeneity is Concerted evolution. Concerted evolution occurs through repeated cycles of unequal crossing over events and repeated cycles of gene transfer and conversion. Unequal crossing over leads to the expansion and contraction of gene families. Gene families have an optimal size range that natural selection acts towards. Contraction deletes divergent gene copies and keeps gene families from becoming too large. Expansion replaces lost gene copies and prevents gene families from becoming too small. Repeat cycles of gene transfer and conversion increasingly make gene family members more similar.

In the process of gene transfer, allelic gene conversion is biased. Mutant alleles spreading in a gene family towards homogeneity is the same process of an advantageous allele spreading in a population towards fixation. Gene conversion also aids in creating genetic variation in some cases.

== Evolution ==
Gene families, part of a hierarchy of information storage in a genome, play a large role in the evolution and diversity of multicellular organisms. Gene families are large units of information and genetic variability. Over evolutionary time, gene families have expanded and contracted with genes within a family duplicating and diversifying into new genes, and genes being lost. An entire gene family may also be lost, or gained through de novo gene birth, by such extensive divergence such that a gene is considered part of a new family, or by horizontal gene transfer. When the number of genes per genome remains relatively constant, this implies that genes are gained and lost at relatively same rates. There are some patterns in which genes are more likely to be lost vs. which are more likely to duplicate and diversify into multiple copies.

An adaptive expansion of a single gene into many initially identical copies occurs when natural selection would favour additional gene copies. This is the case when an environmental stressor acts on a species. Gene amplification is more common in bacteria and is a reversible process. Contraction of gene families commonly results from accumulation of loss of function mutations. A nonsense mutation which prematurely halts gene transcription becomes fixed in the population, leading to the loss of genes. This process occurs when changes in the environment render a gene redundant.

== Functional family ==
In addition to classification by evolution (structural gene family), the HGNC also makes "gene families" by function in their stem nomenclature. As a result, a stem can also refer to genes that have the same function, often part of the same protein complex. For example, BRCA1 and BRCA2 are unrelated genes that are both named for their role in breast cancer and RPS2 and RPS3 are unrelated ribosomal proteins found in the same small subunit.

The HGNC also maintains a "gene group" (formerly "gene family") classification. A gene can be a member of multiple groups, and all groups form a hierarchy. As with the stem classification, both structural and functional groups exist.

== See also ==
- List of gene families
- Protein family
