= U15 =

U15 or U-15 may refer to:

== Submarines ==
- German submarine U-15, various vessels
- Greek submarine Argonaftis (U15)
- SM U-15 (Austria-Hungary), a submarine of the Austro-Hungarian Navy

== University associations ==
- U15 (German universities), a university association in Germany
- U15 Canada, a university association in Canada

== Other uses ==
- U15 (Berlin U-Bahn), a transit line
- Cubohemioctahedron
- Small nucleolar RNA SNORD15
- Uppland Runic Inscription 15
