= Jacquelyn S. Fetrow =

American computational biologist (born 1960)

15th President, Albright College
- In office 2017–2024
- Preceded by: Lex O. McMillan III

Personal details
- Born: 1960 (age 65–66) Pennsylvania
- Spouse: Brian A. Kell
- Parents: Mildred F. Fetrow; David E. Fetrow
- Education: Albright College (BS); Pennsylvania State University (PhD)
- Profession: Computational biophysicist; Academic administrator
- Known for: Computational biophysics

Jacquelyn S. (Jacque) Fetrow (born 1960) is a computational biologist and college administrator who served as the 15th president of Albright College. Before serving as president she served as Provost, Vice President of Academic Affairs, and Professor of Chemistry at the University of Richmond in Richmond, Virginia. Prior to that appointment, she served as Dean of the College at Wake Forest University in Winston-Salem, North Carolina. She also co-founded GeneFormatics, Inc., for which she served as Director and Chief Scientific Officer for four years.

== Early life and education ==
Fetrow is a native of Camp Hill, Pennsylvania. Her mother, Mildred F. Fetrow, was a public school teacher in the West Shore School District, teaching kindergarten, first grade and second grade for many years. Her father, David E. Fetrow, was a carpenter. He also worked as a truck salesman, real estate salesman, and office manager.

Fetrow attended Camp Hill public schools through twelfth grade, Albright College for her bachelor's degree (Biochemistry), and Penn State College of Medicine for a Ph.D. (Biological Chemistry), which she earned in 1986 working with George D. Rose. She did post-doctoral stints at the University of Rochester School of Medicine under the mentorship of Fred Sherman, and at the Whitehead Institute at Massachusetts Institute of Technology under the tutelage of Peter S. Kim.

== Career ==
Fetrow worked at the University at Albany, SUNY, from 1990 to 1998, serving as assistant and then associate professor of biological sciences. She then accepted a position at The Scripps Research Institute. Technology that she helped develop at Scripps served as the foundation for GeneFormatics, Inc., the company that Fetrow co-founded and at which she served as Chief Scientific Officer and Director. In August 2003 she was appointed Reynolds Professor of Computational Biophysics at Wake Forest University in the departments of Physics and Computer Science, and in January 2009 she was appointed as Dean of Wake Forest College. She moved to the University of Richmond to serve as Provost and Vice President of Academic Affairs at the University of Richmond in 2014.

In 2017 Fetrow was appointed president of her alma mater, Albright College. Near the end of her initial five-year term the Albright board unanimously approved an additional five-year contract extension. During her time as president, Albright's reputation and stature grew such that it reached No. 146 in the US News & World Report National Liberal Arts College rankings in 2023, up from 'uncategorized' (below #200) when she began her term as president. She led the drive to right-size Albright's tuition structure in order to be more transparent and to align better with the higher-education market in Pennsylvania and the socioeconomic realities experienced by the college-age student population. At the same time she led the establishment of the Advancing Lives Scholarships endowment to reduce the tuition gap experienced by returning sophomore, junior, and senior students.

As part of efforts to diversify Albright's revenue streams, Fetrow brought to Albright's campus the highly regarded K-12 STEM spectrum of educational programming, originally called Science Research Institute, which has evolved into Total Experience Learning and has been recognized by the United Nations. She worked to bolster Albright's strategic vision as an anchor institution in the city of Reading by transitioning the college's Northeast Reading neighborhood into the Innovation Corridor, a destination and a community where residents live, work, learn and play. Local, state and federal governments provided significant support for the development of that vision. Using external funding, Albright installed the first public electric vehicle charging stations in the city of Reading in 2021.

In April 2024, the Albright College faculty passed a vote of no confidence against President Fetrow. In May 2024, Albright board chair Ron Scheese announced that Fetrow would step down from the presidency, effective May 31, 2024.

In August 2024, Fetrow founded Keltrow Solutions LLC, a higher education and leadership consulting firm, where she serves as principal and president. She serves on the board of directors of Reading Hospital, where she is vice chair, as well as the boards of the Whitaker Center for Science and the Arts and QuantumBio Inc. She is a member of the Penn State Harrisburg Board of Advisors and the external advisory board of the Center for Medical Innovation at Penn State College of Medicine.

== Research ==
Fetrow was the first to describe the non-regular protein structure, omega loop, a structure she identified and studied for her doctoral dissertation (work published under the name Jacquelyn F. Leszczynski). Her early research work involved the experimental analysis of these structures in the protein cytochrome c.

Later, Fetrow's work turned to the classification of functional sites in protein structures, resulting in Fuzzy Functional Forms and active site profiling. This work formed the foundation for the company she co-founded, GeneFormatics. Subsequent development of the active site profiling technology was used to create the Peroxiredoxin Classification Index. This technology has been used to cluster other superfamilies, including the enolases, peroxiredoxins, cytochrome P450s, and arsenate reductases, into functionally relevant clusters.

== Awards and honors ==
- Alumni Fellow, Pennsylvania State University College of Medicine, 2015
- Distinguished Alumnus/a Award, Albright College, October 2010
- Honorary member, Phi Beta Kappa, Wake Forest University, April 2009
- Teaching Innovation Award (for Bioinformatics course, developed with David John), Center for Teaching and Learning, Wake Forest University, February 2006
- Young Alumnus/a Achievement Award, Albright College, May 1997
- Chancellor's Award for Excellence in Teaching, University at Albany, Spring, 1995 (A SUNY-wide award)
- President's Award for Excellence in Teaching, University at Albany, Spring, 1995
- Member, Jacob Albright Society of Scholars (for high academic achievement), Albright College, May 1982
- NRSA Postdoctoral Fellowship (NIH). January, 1987–January, 1990.

== Patents awarded ==
- US patent 8841132, Poole, L.B., King, S.B., and Fetrow, J.S., "Method for detecting compounds containing sulfenic acid using a 1,3-cyclohexanedione-based probe", issued September 23, 2014
- US patent 8486642, Poole, L.B., King, S.B., and Fetrow, J.S., "Method of synthesizing 1,3-cyclohexadione derived reagents useful for detection or isolation of sulfenic acid-containing compounds", issued July 16, 2013
- US patent 7803630, Poole, L.B., King, S.B., and Fetrow, J.S., "Method for Detecting Target Compounds Containing Sulfenic Acids Using New Reagents", issued September 28, 2007
- US patent 7294748, Poole, L.B., King, S.B., and Fetrow, J.S., "Sulfenic Acid-Reactive Compounds And Their Methods Of Synthesis", issued November 13, 2007
- US patent 6631332, Skolnick, J. and Fetrow, J.S., "Methods and Systems for Predicting Protein Function", issued October 7, 2003

== Selected publications ==
- Rosen, MR; Leuthaeuser, JB; Parish, CA; Fetrow, JS (2020). "Isofunctional Clustering and Conformational Analysis of the Arsenate Reductase Superfamily Reveals Nine Distinct Clusters". Biochemistry. 59 (44): 4262–4284. doi:10.1021/acs.biochem.0c00651. PMID 33135415.
- Harper, AF; Leuthaeuser, JB; Babbitt, PC; Morris, JH; Ferrin, TE; Poole, LB; Fetrow, JS (2017). "An Atlas of Peroxiredoxins Created Using an Active Site Profile-Based Approach to Functionally Relevant Clustering of Proteins". PLOS Computational Biology. 13 (2) e1005284. Bibcode:2017PLSCB..13E5284H. doi:10.1371/journal.pcbi.1005284. PMC 5302317. PMID 28187133.
- Gober, JG; Rydeen, AE; Gibson-O'Grady, EJ; Leuthaeuser, JB; Fetrow, JS; Brustad, EM (2016). "Mutating a Highly Conserved Residue in Diverse Cytochrome P450s Facilitates Diastereoselective Olefin Cyclopropanation". ChemBioChem. 17 (5): 394–7. doi:10.1002/cbic.201500624. PMC 5241096. PMID 26690878..
- Loeser, RF; Olex, A; McNulty, MA; Carlson, CS; Callahan, M; Ferguson, C; Chou, J; Leng, X; Fetrow, JS (Mar 2012). "Microarray analysis reveals age-related differences in gene expression during the development of osteoarthritis in mice". Arthritis & Rheumatism. 64 (3): 705–17. doi:10.1002/art.33388. PMC 3269534. PMID 21972019.
- Lewis, DR; Olex, AL; Lundy, SR; Turkett, WH; Fetrow, JS; Muday, GK (Sep 2013). "A kinetic analysis of the auxin transcriptome reveals cell wall remodeling proteins that modulate lateral root development in Arabidopsis". The Plant Cell. 25 (9): 3329–46. Bibcode:2013PlanC..25.3329L. doi:10.1105/tpc.113.114868. PMC 3809535. PMID 24045021.
- Nelson, KJ; Knutson, ST; Soito, L; Klomsiri, C; Poole, LB; Fetrow, JS (Mar 2011). "Analysis of the peroxiredoxin family: using active-site structure and sequence information for global classification and residue analysis". Proteins: Structure, Function, and Bioinformatics. 79 (3): 947–64. doi:10.1002/prot.22936. PMC 3065352. PMID 21287625.
- Salsbury Jr, F.R.; Knutson, S.T.; Poole, LB; Fetrow, J.S. (Feb 2008). "Functional Site Profiling and Electrostatic Analysis of Cysteines Modifiable to Cysteine Sulfenic Acid". Protein Science. 17 (2): 299–312. doi:10.1110/ps.073096508. PMC 2222711. PMID 18227433.
- Skolnick, J.; Fetrow, J.S. (Jan 2000). "From genes to protein structure and function: Novel applications of computational approaches in the genomic era". Trends in Biotechnology. 18 (1): 34–39. doi:10.1016/S0167-7799(99)01398-0. PMID 10631780.
- Skolnick, J.; Fetrow, J.S.; Kolinski, A. (Mar 2000). "Structural genomics and its importance for gene function analysis". Nature Biotechnology. 18 (3): 283–287. doi:10.1038/73723. PMID 10700142.
- Fetrow, J.S.; Skolnick, J. (Sep 1998). "Method for prediction of protein function from sequence using the sequence-to-structure-to-function paradigm with application to glutaredoxins/thioredoxins and T1 ribonucleases". Journal of Molecular Biology. 281 (5): 949–968. doi:10.1006/jmbi.1998.1993. PMID 9719646.
- Fetrow, J.S.; Godzik, A. (1998). R.B. Altman; A.K. Dunker; L. Hunter T. Klein (eds.). "Function driven protein evolution: A possible proto-protein for the RNA-binding proteins". Proceedings of Pacific Symposium on Biocomputing: 485–496. PMID 9697206.
- Fetrow, J.S. Omega Loops (Jun 1995). "Omega loops; nonregular secondary structures significant in protein function and stability". The FASEB Journal. 9 (9): 708–717. doi:10.1096/fasebj.9.9.7601335. PMID 7601335.
- Leszczynski (Nov 1986). "Loops in globular proteins: Identification of a novel category of secondary structure". Science. 234 (4778): 849–55. Bibcode:1986Sci...234..849L. doi:10.1126/science.3775366. PMID 3775366.
