= Frenolicin B =

Names
- IUPAC name (11R,15R,17R)-4-Hydroxy-17-propyl-12,16-dioxatetracyclo[8.7.0.03,8.011,15]heptadeca-1(10),3(8),4,6-tetraene-2,9,13-trione

Identifiers
CAS Number	68930-68-7
3D model (JSmol)	Interactive image
Beilstein Reference	6436493
ChEBI	CHEBI:48201
ChEMBL	ChEMBL474390
ChemSpider	143304
PubChem CID	163292
UNII	385375GE9Y
CompTox Dashboard (EPA)	DTXSID10219000
- InChI: InChI=1S/C18H16O6/c1-2-4-10-14-15(18-11(23-10)7-12(20)24-18)16(21)8-5-3-6-9(19)13(8)17(14)22/h3,5-6,10-11,18-19H,2,4,7H2,1H3/t10-,11-,18+/m1/s1 Key: AVCPRTNVVRPELB-YRUZYCQGSA-N
- SMILES: CCC[C@@H]1C2=C([C@@H]3[C@H](O1)CC(=O)O3)C(=O)C4=C(C2=O)C(=CC=C4)O

Properties
Chemical formula	C_{18}H_{16}O_{6}
Molar mass	328.320 g·mol^{−1}
- Except where otherwise noted, data are given for materials in their standard state (at 25 °C [77 °F], 100 kPa). Infobox references

Frenolicin B is an antibiotic and antitumor agent with the molecular formula C_{18}H_{16}O_{6} which is produced by the bacterium Streptomyces roseofulvus. Frenolicin B is a selective inhibitor of glutaredoxin 3 and peroxiredoxin 1.
