= PRMT3 =

Protein-coding gene in the species Homo sapiens

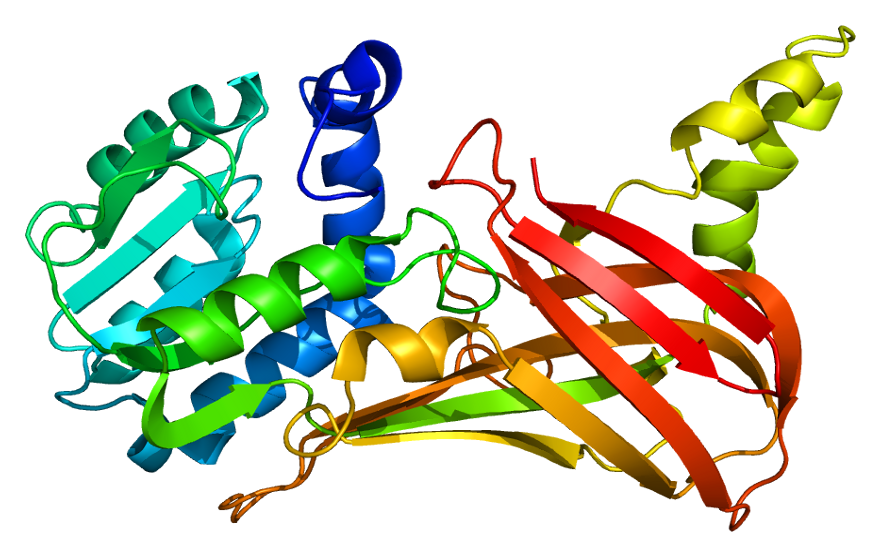

Identifiers
- Aliases: PRMT3, HRMT1L3, protein arginine methyltransferase 3
- External IDs: OMIM: 603190; MGI: 1919224; GeneCards: PRMT3
Available structures
PDB	Ortholog search: PDBe RCSB
PDB	List of PDB id codes 2FYT, 3SMQ, 4HSG, 4QQN, 4RYL
Enzyme activity
EC #	BRENDA	ExPASy	KEGG	MetaCyc
2.1.1.319	↗	↗	↗	↗

Gene location (Human)
Chr.	Chromosome 11 (human)
Band	11p15.1	Start	20,387,558 bp
Band	11p15.1	End	20,509,338 bp

Gene location (Mouse)
Chr.	Chromosome 7 (mouse)
Band	7|7 B4	Start	49,428,094 bp
Band	7|7 B4	End	49,508,013 bp
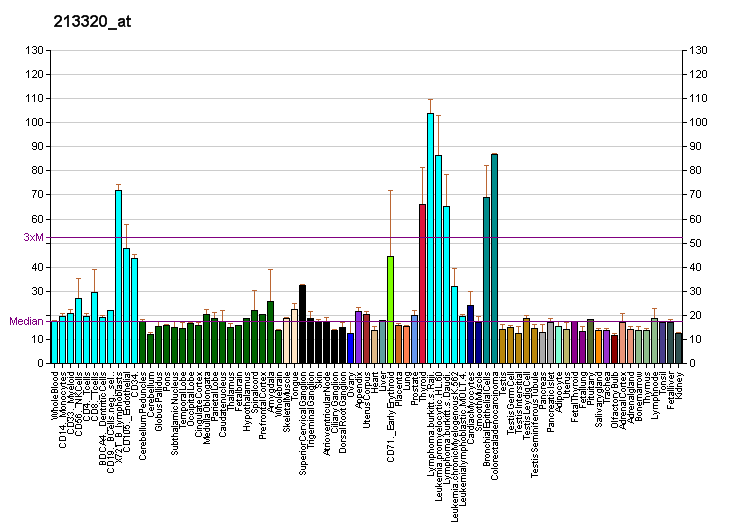
RNA expression pattern
Bgee	Human / Mouse (ortholog); Top expressed in: ventricular zone; Achilles tendon; gonad; gingival epithelium; gastrocnemius muscle; left lobe of thyroid gland; germinal epithelium; right lobe of thyroid gland; islet of Langerhans; C1 segment / Top expressed in: genital tubercle; tail of embryo; condyle; cumulus cell; fossa; substantia nigra; Paneth cell; primitive streak; endothelial cell of lymphatic vessel; epiblast; More reference expression data
BioGPS	More reference expression data
Gene ontology
Molecular function	metal ion binding; methyltransferase activity; transferase activity; protein binding; protein-arginine N-methyltransferase activity; nucleic acid binding; histone-arginine N-methyltransferase activity; protein-arginine omega-N asymmetric methyltransferase activity; ribosome binding
Cellular component	ribosome; cytoplasm; cytosol; nucleus
Biological process	methylation; negative regulation of protein ubiquitination; peptidyl-arginine N-methylation; protein methylation; regulation of transcription, DNA-templated; peptidyl-arginine methylation, to asymmetrical-dimethyl arginine; histone arginine methylation
Sources:Amigo / QuickGO
Orthologs
Databases	NCBI: entry; OMA: entry
Species	Human	Mouse
Entrez	10196	71974
Ensembl	ENSG00000185238	ENSMUSG00000030505
UniProt	O60678	Q922H1
RefSeq (mRNA)	NM_001145166; NM_001145167; NM_005788	NM_133740
RefSeq (protein)	NP_001138638; NP_001138639; NP_005779	NP_598501
Location (UCSC)	Chr 11: 20.39 – 20.51 Mb	Chr 7: 49.43 – 49.51 Mb
PubMed search
- Wikidata
View/Edit Human	View/Edit Mouse

Protein arginine N-methyltransferase 3 is an enzyme that in humans is encoded by the PRMT3 gene.

== Interactions ==
PRMT3 has been shown to interact with RPS2.
