= MAP3K13 =

Protein-coding gene in the species Homo sapiens

Identifiers
- Aliases: MAP3K13, LZK, MEKK13, MLK, mitogen-activated protein kinase kinase kinase 13
- External IDs: OMIM: 604915; MGI: 2444243; GeneCards: MAP3K13
Enzyme activity
EC #	BRENDA	ExPASy	KEGG	MetaCyc
2.7.11.25	↗	↗	↗	↗

Gene location (Human)
Chr.	Chromosome 3 (human)
Band	3q27.2	Start	185,282,941 bp
Band	3q27.2	End	185,489,094 bp

Gene location (Mouse)
Chr.	Chromosome 16 (mouse)
Band	16|16 B1	Start	21,613,096 bp
Band	16|16 B1	End	21,752,189 bp
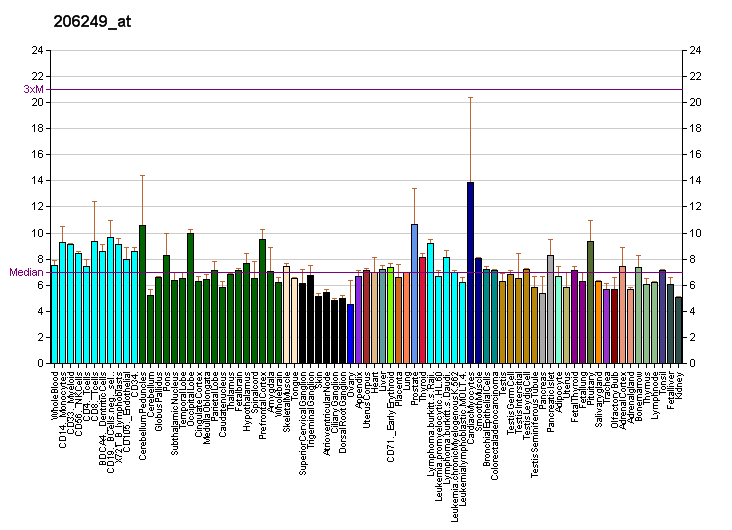

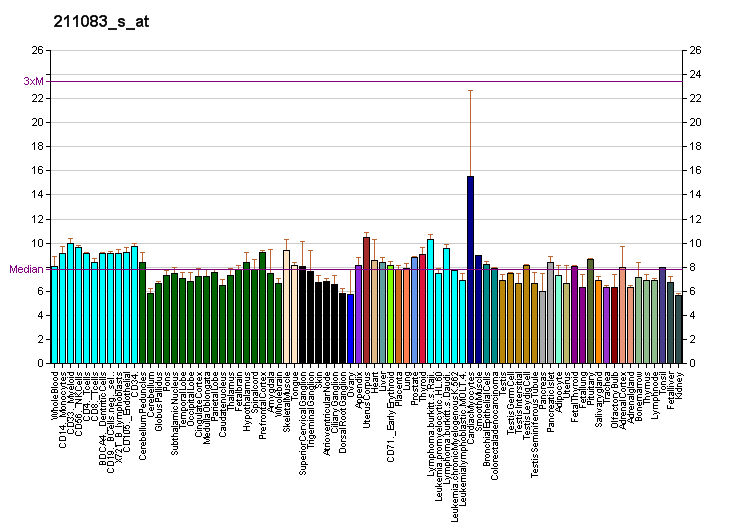
RNA expression pattern
Bgee	Human / Mouse (ortholog); Top expressed in: corpus epididymis; caput epididymis; tail of epididymis; sperm; mucosa of paranasal sinus; lower lobe of lung; lactiferous duct; buccal mucosa cell; pons; inferior ganglion of vagus nerve / Top expressed in: ureter; ganglionic eminence; neural layer of retina; jejunum; cerebellum; cerebellar cortex; colon; duodenum; dentate gyrus of hippocampal formation granule cell; superior frontal gyrus; More reference expression data
BioGPS	More reference expression data
Gene ontology
Molecular function	protein binding; protein homodimerization activity; identical protein binding; kinase activity; MAP kinase kinase kinase activity; protein serine/threonine kinase activity; protein kinase activity; ATP binding; protein kinase binding; metal ion binding; nucleotide binding; transferase activity; JUN kinase kinase kinase activity; IkappaB kinase complex binding; enzyme binding
Cellular component	membrane; cytoplasm; IkappaB kinase complex
Biological process	phosphorylation; JNK cascade; protein phosphorylation; protein autophosphorylation; positive regulation of NF-kappaB transcription factor activity; MAPK cascade; positive regulation of neuron maturation; peptidyl-serine phosphorylation; positive regulation of axon extension; positive regulation of neuron projection arborization; positive regulation of branching morphogenesis of a nerve
Sources:Amigo / QuickGO
Orthologs
Databases	NCBI: entry; OMA: entry
Species	Human	Mouse
Entrez	9175	71751
Ensembl	ENSG00000073803	ENSMUSG00000033618
UniProt	O43283	Q1HKZ5
RefSeq (mRNA)	NM_001242314; NM_001242317; NM_004721	NM_172821
RefSeq (protein)	NP_001229243; NP_001229246; NP_004712	NP_766409
Location (UCSC)	Chr 3: 185.28 – 185.49 Mb	Chr 16: 21.61 – 21.75 Mb
PubMed search
- Wikidata
View/Edit Human	View/Edit Mouse

Mitogen-activated protein kinase kinase kinase 13 is an enzyme that in humans is encoded by the MAP3K13 gene.

== Function ==
The protein encoded by this gene is a member of serine/threonine protein kinase family. This kinase contains a dual leucine-zipper motif, and has been shown to form dimers/oligomers through its leucine-zipper motif. This kinase can phosphorylate and activate MAPK8/JNK, MAP2K7/MKK7, which suggests a role in the JNK signaling pathway.

== Interactions ==
MAP3K13 has been shown to interact with PRDX3.
