= Ángel Ortiz =

Ángel Ortiz may refer to:

- LA II (born 1967), born Angel Ortiz, American graffiti artist
- Ángel Ortiz (scientist) (1966–2008), Spanish scientist
- Ángel Ortiz (footballer, born 1977), Paraguayan footballer
- Angel Ortiz (born 1991), American professional wrestler who goes by the ring name Ortiz
- Ángel Ortiz Monasterio (1849–1922), Mexican vice-admiral
- Ángel Ortiz (footballer, born 2004), Spanish football right-back
