= Sulfiredoxin =

sulfiredoxin

Identifiers
- EC no.: 1.8.98.2

Databases
- BRENDA: enzyme data
- ExPASy: NiceZyme view
- KEGG: enzyme entry
- MetaCyc: metabolic pathway
- Rhea: reactions
- PDB structures: RCSB PDB PDBe PDBsum
- Gene Ontology: AmiGO / QuickGO
Search
- PMC: articles
- PubMed: articles
- NCBI: proteins

In enzymology, a sulfiredoxin (EC 1.8.98.2) is an enzyme that catalyzes the chemical reaction

peroxiredoxin-(S-hydroxy-S-oxocysteine) + ATP + 2 R-SH $\rightleftharpoons$ peroxiredoxin-(S-hydroxycysteine) + ADP + phosphate + R-S-S-R

The 3 substrates of this enzyme are peroxiredoxin-(S-hydroxy-S-oxocysteine), ATP, and a thiol, whereas its 4 products are peroxiredoxin-(S-hydroxycysteine), ADP, phosphate, and a protein disulfide.

This enzyme is involved in antioxidant metabolism by re-activating peroxiredoxins, which are a group of peroxidases, when these enzymes are inhibited by over-oxidation.

This enzyme belongs to the family of oxidoreductases, specifically those acting on a sulfur group of donors with other, known, acceptors. The systematic name of this enzyme class is peroxiredoxin-(S-hydroxy-S-oxocysteine):thiol oxidoreductase [ATP-hydrolysing; peroxiredoxin-(S-hydroxycysteine)-forming]. Other names in common use include Srx1, sulphiredoxin, and peroxiredoxin-(S-hydroxy-S-oxocysteine) reductase.

== Function ==
The sulfur atom in the side-chain of the amino acid cysteine can exist in several different oxidation states. The most reduced of these is as a thiol group (Cys-SH). Oxidation of cysteine produces cystine, which is one half of a disulfide bond (Cys-S-S-Cys). These lower oxidation states of cysteine (disulfides) are readily reversible, but higher oxidation states, such as sulfinic acid (Cys-SOOH), were once considered irreversible, biologically speaking. This view changed with the discovery of sulfiredoxin, an enzyme that can reduce sulfinic acid back to thiol, in an ATP-dependent manner. Additional work suggests that it plays a role in resolving mixed disulfide bonds.

Initially discovered in yeast, sulfiredoxin is conserved in all eukaryotes, including mammals. In a perfect example of how multiple gene names can confuse the field, sulfiredoxin (Srxn1) was already known as a gene of unknown function, cloned by differential display of an in vitro model of tumorigenesis, and termed “Neoplastic progression 3/Npn3” although nothing about its actual function was reported. As a result, in most mouse microarray studies, sulfiredoxin is termed neoplastic progression 3, and typically classified as “cancer related” or “other” rather than as “antioxidant”.

Npn3/Srxn1 is upregulated by an exceptionally large fold-magnitude in microarray studies of oxidative stress. Npn3/Srxn1 is induced up to 32-fold by D3T (liver), 12-fold by CdCl2, (liver), 4- to 10-fold by paracetamol (liver) and 3.3-fold by paraquat (heart). A survey of the GEO database also indicates a large induction of Npn3/Srxn1 is observed in injury to the lung by hyperoxia (data set GDS247, ID# 102780_at) or phosgene (GDS1244, 1451680_at). That Npn3 and Sxrn1 are synonyms of the same gene has not been pointed out in any of the 15 papers written on Srxn1 since its discovery.

Because it was discovered so recently, the function of sulfiredoxin is not yet fully known.

Sulfiredoxin knockout mice is available in Dr. Qiou Wei's lab at University of Kentucky and mice are found normal under normal circumstances. On treatment of these mice with carcinogens, Srx knockout mice were found to be less prone to few cancer types compared to wildtype mice. It shows the critical role of Srx in carcinogenesis of human tumors.
