= Ángel Ortiz (scientist) =

Ángel Ramírez Ortiz (30 June 1966 – 5 May 2008) was a Spanish scientist in the area of protein structure & bioinformatics. He was best known for the creation of the software package MAMMOTH for protein structure comparison.

Ortiz died in 2008 having been diagnosed with cancer some years earlier. He is notable in having dedicated the remaining years of his life to studying cancer and the search for treatments.

== Biography ==
Ángel Ramírez Ortiz was born on 30 June 1966 in Galicia, Spain. He obtained a Pharmacy degree by the Complutense University of Madrid, then joined the incipient research group of Federico Gago at the University of Alcalá as a PhD student. He became involved in a project financed mostly by Menarini Pharmaceuticals, aimed at the rationalization of the biochemical activity of a number of phospholipase A2 (PLA2) enzymes from different sources and, ultimately, at the design of novel inhibitors of human synovial fluid PLA2 tagged as anti-inflammatory agents. During his thesis development, Ortiz visited and worked at the University of Groningen in the Netherlands and the European Molecular Biology Laboratory in Heidelberg.

=== Research ===
Upon completion of his Ph.D., Ortiz joined Prof. Jeffrey Skolnick's group at the Department of Molecular Biology at the Scripps Research Institute in United States (1996–2000). There he significantly contributed to the development of MONSTER, at the time one of the most successful Monte Carlo algorithms for predicting protein structure in the absence of a template, as assessed in the Critical Assessment of Techniques for Protein Structure Prediction (CASP), a contest for which he would soon be acting as an advisor. A few years later, he developed, in collaboration with Bin Qian and David Baker, an original and imaginative framework for assisting homology-based modelling of protein structures making use of both empirical knowledge of protein structure evolution and equilibrium dynamics. In 2000 Ortiz moved to New York City and started to work in Mount Sinai School of Medicine, establishing his own researching group on genomics. During this period he developed MAMMOTH, a program that is now consolidated as one of the references in the field of protein structure alignment.

Later on, Ortiz went back to Spain, where he founded and headed the Bioinformatics Unit at the Centro de Biología Molecular "Severo Ochoa" in Madrid, under the auspices of the Spanish National Research Council. There he applied the MAMMOTH algorithm to the study of protein structure evolution, unveiling how deeply protein topology constrains the possible evolutionary paths. The other research pillar in his group was the development and optimization of a complete suite of programs to carry out docking and virtual screening experiments aimed at the identification of drug candidates, being gCOMBINE (COMparative BINding Energy) and CRDOCK two successful examples.

=== Death ===
On 5 May 2008, Ángel Ramírez Ortiz died of cancer in Madrid at the age of 41. Despite having been diagnosed with a brain tumour years before, Ortiz continued with his work searching for molecules that act as inhibitors of an enzyme that is largely responsible for the resistance to chemotherapy of some tumour cells, including those from glioblastoma multiforme, the cancer that ended his life.
