= 40S ribosomal protein S3 =

Protein-coding gene in the species Homo sapiens

RPS3
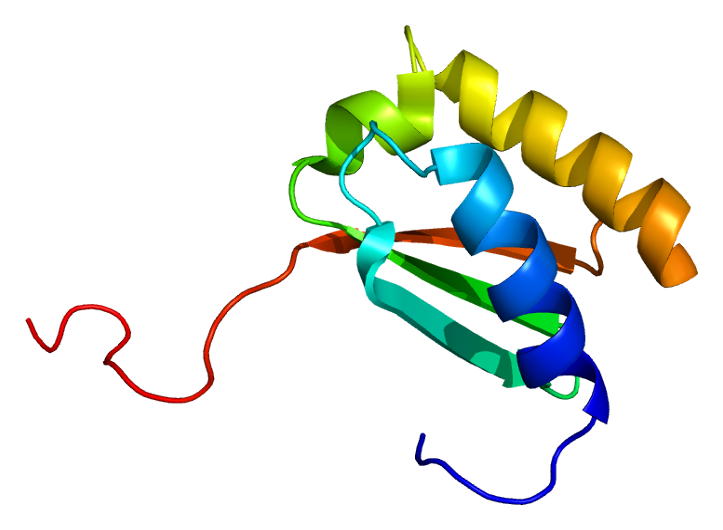

Identifiers
- Aliases: RPS3, S3, ribosomal protein S3
- External IDs: OMIM: 600454; MGI: 1350917; GeneCards: RPS3
Available structures
PDB	Ortholog search: PDBe RCSB
PDB	List of PDB id codes 1WH9, 4UG0, 4V6X, 5A2Q, 5AJ0, 3J7P, 4UJE, 4D5L, 3J7R, 4UJD, 4V5Z, 5FLX, 4D61, 4UJC
Enzyme activity
EC #	BRENDA	ExPASy	KEGG	MetaCyc
4.2.99.18	↗	↗	↗	↗

Gene location (Human)
Chr.	Chromosome 11 (human)
Band	11q13.4	Start	75,399,515 bp
Band	11q13.4	End	75,422,280 bp

Gene location (Mouse)
Chr.	Chromosome 7 (mouse)
Band	7 E1|7 54.07 cM	Start	99,127,103 bp
Band	7 E1|7 54.07 cM	End	99,132,945 bp
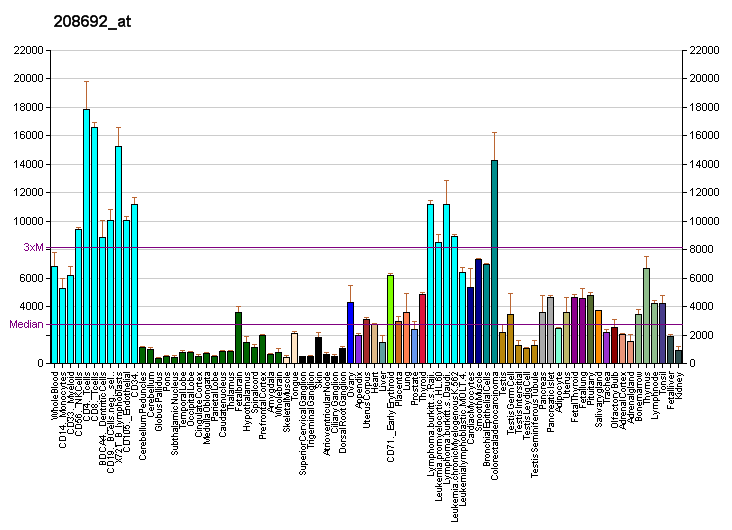

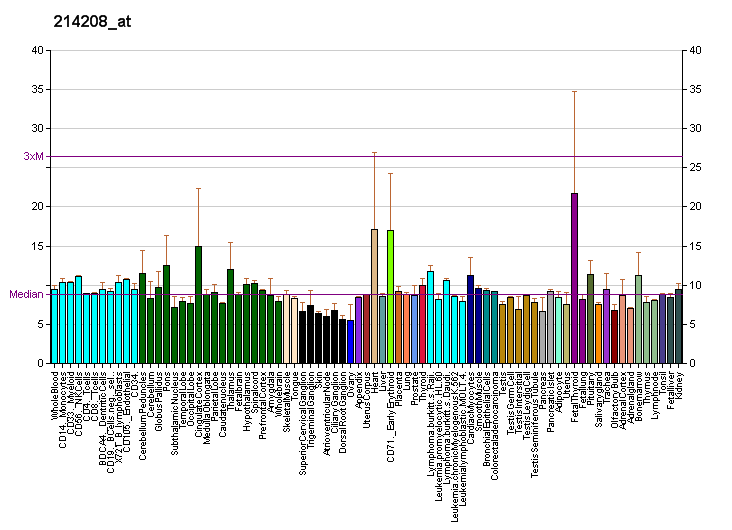
RNA expression pattern
Bgee	Human / Mouse (ortholog); Top expressed in: left ovary; right ovary; right uterine tube; ventricular zone; ganglionic eminence; canal of the cervix; epithelium of colon; stromal cell of endometrium; granulocyte; body of uterus / Top expressed in: otic vesicle; epidermis; tracheobronchial tree; autopod region; mesenteric lymph nodes; hand; ovary; trachea; ventricular zone; lactiferous gland; More reference expression data
BioGPS	More reference expression data
Gene ontology
Molecular function	tubulin binding; DNA N-glycosylase activity; small ribosomal subunit rRNA binding; iron-sulfur cluster binding; transcription factor binding; oxidized purine DNA binding; Hsp70 protein binding; lyase activity; enzyme binding; mRNA binding; structural constituent of ribosome; damaged DNA binding; ubiquitin-like protein conjugating enzyme binding; protein binding; DNA-(apurinic or apyrimidinic site) endonuclease activity; oxidized pyrimidine DNA binding; endodeoxyribonuclease activity; protein kinase binding; supercoiled DNA binding; DNA binding; Hsp90 protein binding; microtubule binding; protein kinase A binding; RNA binding; kinase binding; RNA polymerase II transcription regulatory region sequence-specific DNA binding; protein-containing complex binding; class I DNA-(apurinic or apyrimidinic site) endonuclease activity; class III/IV DNA-(apurinic or apyrimidinic site) endonuclease activity; oxidized purine nucleobase lesion DNA N-glycosylase activity
Cellular component	cytoplasm; cytosol; polysome; membrane; focal adhesion; ruffle membrane; mitochondrion; cytoskeleton; nucleus; ribosome; nucleolus; extracellular exosome; plasma membrane; spindle; mitochondrial matrix; small ribosomal subunit; mitotic spindle; mitochondrial inner membrane; cytosolic small ribosomal subunit; nucleoplasm; extracellular matrix; endoplasmic reticulum; NF-kappaB complex; postsynaptic density; ribonucleoprotein complex; synapse
Biological process	chromosome segregation; positive regulation of endodeoxyribonuclease activity; cellular response to DNA damage stimulus; positive regulation of microtubule polymerization; cell cycle; apoptotic process; negative regulation of translation; regulation of transcription, DNA-templated; viral transcription; response to TNF agonist; positive regulation of apoptotic signaling pathway; response to oxidative stress; transcription, DNA-templated; SRP-dependent cotranslational protein targeting to membrane; positive regulation of cysteine-type endopeptidase activity involved in execution phase of apoptosis; positive regulation of intrinsic apoptotic signaling pathway in response to DNA damage; positive regulation of DNA N-glycosylase activity; positive regulation of JUN kinase activity; nuclear-transcribed mRNA catabolic process, nonsense-mediated decay; negative regulation of DNA repair; positive regulation of DNA repair; positive regulation of NIK/NF-kappaB signaling; cell division; spindle assembly; negative regulation of protein ubiquitination; positive regulation of gene expression; translational initiation; regulation of translation; cellular response to hydrogen peroxide; protein biosynthesis; positive regulation of base-excision repair; DNA repair; regulation of apoptotic process; rRNA processing; cytoplasmic translation; positive regulation of protein-containing complex assembly; positive regulation of interleukin-2 production; positive regulation of activated T cell proliferation; positive regulation of T cell receptor signaling pathway; positive regulation of NF-kappaB transcription factor activity; cellular response to tumor necrosis factor
Sources:Amigo / QuickGO
Orthologs
Databases	NCBI: entry; OMA: entry
Species	Human	Mouse
Entrez	6188	27050
Ensembl	ENSG00000149273	ENSMUSG00000030744
UniProt	P23396	P62908
RefSeq (mRNA)	NM_001260507; NM_001005; NM_001256802; NM_001260506	NM_012052
RefSeq (protein)	NP_000996; NP_001243731; NP_001247435; NP_001247436	NP_036182
Location (UCSC)	Chr 11: 75.4 – 75.42 Mb	Chr 7: 99.13 – 99.13 Mb
PubMed search
- Wikidata
View/Edit Human	View/Edit Mouse

40S ribosomal protein S3 is a protein that in humans is encoded by the RPS3 gene.

== Function ==
Ribosomes, the organelles that catalyze protein synthesis, consist of a small 40S subunit and a large 60S subunit. Together these subunits are composed of 4 RNA species and approximately 80 structurally distinct proteins. This gene encodes a ribosomal protein that is a component of the 40S subunit, where it forms part of the domain where translation is initiated. The protein belongs to the S3P family of ribosomal proteins. Studies of the mouse and rat proteins have demonstrated that the protein has an extraribosomal role as an endonuclease involved in the repair of UV-induced DNA damage. The protein appears to be located in both the cytoplasm and nucleus but not in the nucleolus. Higher levels of expression of this gene in colon adenocarcinomas and adenomatous polyps compared to adjacent normal colonic mucosa have been observed. This gene is co-transcribed with the small nucleolar RNA genes U15A and U15B, which are located in its first and fifth introns, respectively. As is typical for genes encoding ribosomal proteins, there are multiple processed pseudogenes of this gene dispersed through the genome.
