= 40S ribosomal protein S2 =

Protein found in humans

RPS2

Identifiers
- Aliases: RPS2, LLREP3, S2, ribosomal protein S2
- External IDs: OMIM: 603624; MGI: 105110; GeneCards: RPS2
Available structures
PDB	Ortholog search: PDBe RCSB
PDB	List of PDB id codes 4UG0, 4V6X, 5A2Q, 5AJ0, 5FLX, 4D61, 4D5L, 4UJD, 4UJE, 4UJC

Gene location (Human)
Chr.	Chromosome 16 (human)
Band	16p13.3	Start	1,962,058 bp
Band	16p13.3	End	1,964,841 bp

Gene location (Mouse)
Chr.	Chromosome 17 (mouse)
Band	17|17 A3.3	Start	24,937,090 bp
Band	17|17 A3.3	End	24,940,903 bp
RNA expression pattern
Bgee	Human / Mouse (ortholog); Top expressed in: stromal cell of endometrium; right uterine tube; right ovary; body of pancreas; left ovary; ventricular zone; mucosa of transverse colon; ganglionic eminence; granulocyte; zone of skin / Top expressed in: ventricular zone; lip; esophagus; ovary; zone of skin; lens; ganglionic eminence; ileum; quadriceps femoris muscle; uterus; More reference expression data
BioGPS	n/a
Gene ontology
Molecular function	structural constituent of ribosome; protein binding; enzyme binding; fibroblast growth factor binding; mRNA binding; RNA binding; cadherin binding
Cellular component	cytosol; ribosome; membrane; focal adhesion; cytosolic small ribosomal subunit; nucleolus; small ribosomal subunit; extracellular exosome; nucleus; nucleoplasm; synapse
Biological process	viral transcription; SRP-dependent cotranslational protein targeting to membrane; translational initiation; positive regulation of transferase activity; nuclear-transcribed mRNA catabolic process, nonsense-mediated decay; protein biosynthesis; rRNA processing; protein methylation; positive regulation of ubiquitin-protein transferase activity; cellular response to interleukin-4
Sources:Amigo / QuickGO
Orthologs
Databases	NCBI: entry; OMA: entry
Species	Human	Mouse
Entrez	6187	16898
Ensembl	ENSG00000140988	ENSMUSG00000044533
UniProt	P15880	P25444
RefSeq (mRNA)	NM_002952	NM_008503
RefSeq (protein)	NP_002943	NP_032529
Location (UCSC)	Chr 16: 1.96 – 1.96 Mb	Chr 17: 24.94 – 24.94 Mb
PubMed search
- Wikidata
View/Edit Human	View/Edit Mouse

The RPS2 gene is the gene which, in humans, encodes the 40S ribosomal protein S2.

Ribosomes, the organelles that catalyze protein synthesis, consist of a small 40S subunit and a large 60S subunit. Together these subunits are composed of 4 RNA species and approximately 80 structurally distinct proteins. This gene encodes a ribosomal protein that is a component of the 40S subunit. The protein belongs to the S5P family of ribosomal proteins. It is located in the cytoplasm. This gene shares sequence similarity with mouse LLRep3. It is co-transcribed with the small nucleolar RNA gene U64, which is located in its third intron. As is typical for genes encoding ribosomal proteins, there are multiple processed pseudogenes of this gene dispersed through the genome.

== Interactions ==
RPS2 has been shown to interact with PRMT3.
