= Streptomyces roseofulvus =

Scientific classification
- Domain: Bacteria
- Kingdom: Bacillati
- Phylum: Actinomycetota
- Class: Actinomycetes
- Order: Streptomycetales
- Family: Streptomycetaceae
- Genus: Streptomyces
- Species: S. roseofulvus

Binomial name
- Streptomyces roseofulvus Pridham et al. 1958

Type strain
- AS 4.1847, ATCC 19805, ATCC 19921, BCRC 12051, CBS 124.60, CBS 557.68, CCRC 12051, CGMCC 4.1777, CGMCC 4.1847, DSM 40172, IFO 13194, IFO 15816, IFO 15817, INA 14535, ISP 5172, JCM 4334, JCM 4605, KCC S-0334, KCC S-0605, LMG 20263, NBRC 13194, NBRC 15816, NBRC 15817, NRRL B-2729, NRRL B-27290, NRRL-ISP 5172, RIA 1084, UNIQEM 191, VKM Ac-1080

Synonyms
- Actinomyces roseofulvus

Species of bacterium

Streptomyces roseofulvus is a bacterium species from the genus of Streptomyces which has been isolated from soil. Streptomyces roseofulvus produces deoxyfrenolicin and frenolicin B.

== See also ==
- List of Streptomyces species
