= Peroxiredoxin classification index =

PREX

Content
- Description: database of subfamily assignments across the diverse peroxiredoxin family.

Contact
- Research center: Wake Forest University
- Laboratory: Department of Biochemistry
- Authors: Laura Soito, Leslie Poole, Kimberly Nelson, Stacy Knutson, Jacquelyn Fetrow
- Primary citation: Soito & al. (2011)
- Release date: 2010

Access
- Website: http://www.csb.wfu.edu/prex/

PeroxiRedoxin classification indEX (PREX) is a database of peroxiredoxins (Prxs) classified into one of six distinct subfamilies. Classification relies on the Deacon Active Site Profiling (DASP) approach that utilizes a position specific scoring matrix (PSSM) created from aligned signatures (built from sequence fragments surrounding active sites of structurally-characterized Prx group members) to search sequence databases. Searches of PREX for Prxs of interest can be conducted using protein annotation, accession number, PDB ID, organism name, or protein sequence (using BLAST) for Prx proteins extracted from January 2008, November 2010, or October 2011 versions of GenBank (over 8000 validated Prx sequences represented). Output includes the subfamily to which each classified Prx belongs, accession and GI numbers, genus and species, and the active site signature used for classification. The query sequence is also presented aligned with a select group of Prxs for manual evaluation and interpretation by the user. This resource is freely available to the research community.

== See also ==
- Peroxiredoxin
