= PRDX4 =

Protein-coding gene in the species Homo sapiens

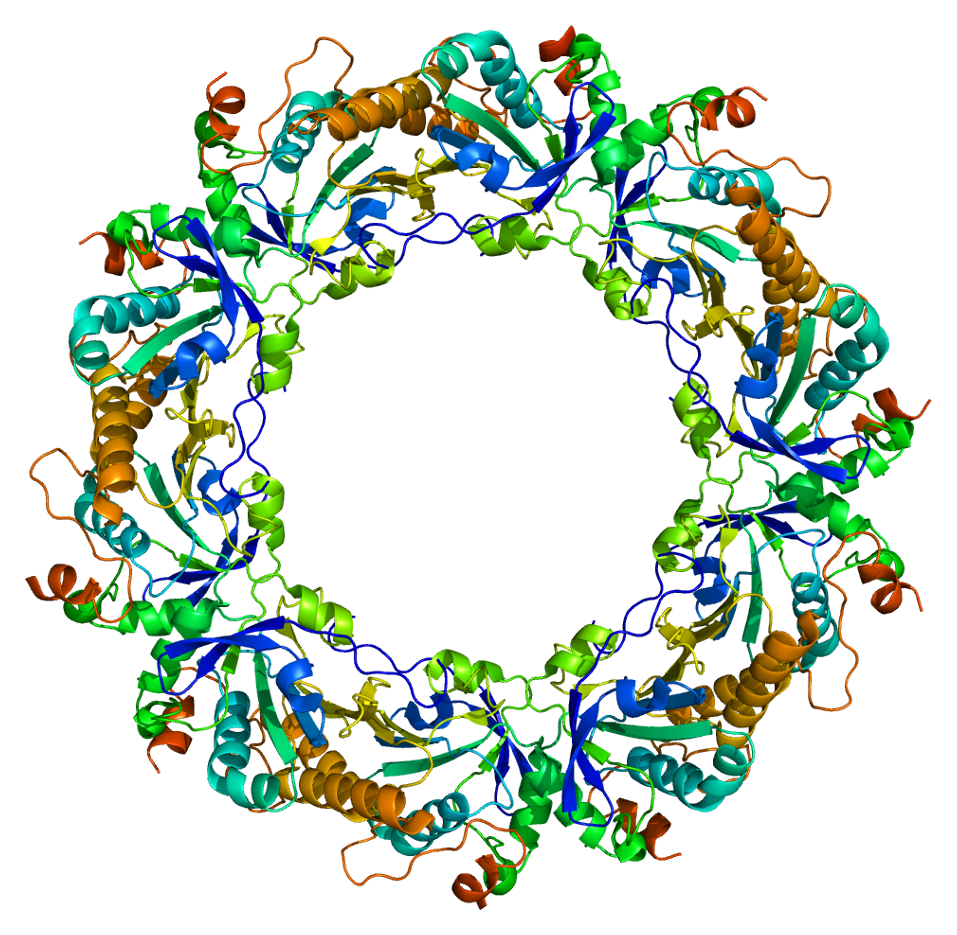

Identifiers
- Aliases: PRDX4, AOE37-2, AOE372, HEL-S-97n, PRX-4, peroxiredoxin 4
- External IDs: OMIM: 300927; MGI: 1859815; GeneCards: PRDX4
Available structures
PDB	Ortholog search: PDBe RCSB
PDB	List of PDB id codes 2PN8, 3TJB, 3TJF, 3TJG, 3TJJ, 3TJK, 3TKP, 3TKQ, 3TKR, 3TKS, 4RQX
Enzyme activity
EC #	BRENDA	ExPASy	KEGG	MetaCyc
1.11.1.24	↗	↗	↗	↗

Gene location (Human)
Chr.	X chromosome (human)
Band	Xp22.11	Start	23,664,262 bp
Band	Xp22.11	End	23,686,397 bp

Gene location (Mouse)
Chr.	X chromosome (mouse)
Band	X F3|X 72.38 cM	Start	154,106,914 bp
Band	X F3|X 72.38 cM	End	154,123,750 bp
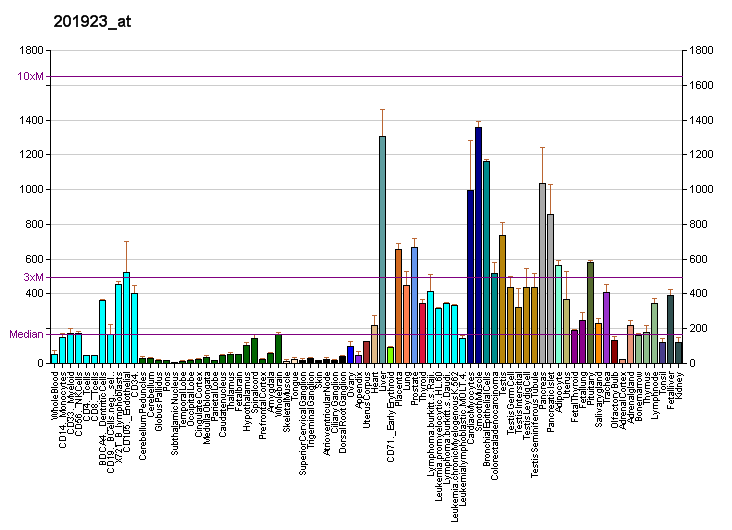
RNA expression pattern
Bgee	Human / Mouse (ortholog); Top expressed in: body of pancreas; tibia; islet of Langerhans; parotid gland; stromal cell of endometrium; beta cell; gonad; right testis; left testis; cartilage tissue / Top expressed in: saccule; otic placode; otic vesicle; external carotid artery; dermis; endocardial cushion; maxillary prominence; Gonadal ridge; vas deferens; cumulus cell; More reference expression data
BioGPS	More reference expression data
Gene ontology
Molecular function	protein homodimerization activity; peroxidase activity; thioredoxin peroxidase activity; antioxidant activity; protein binding; peroxiredoxin activity; oxidoreductase activity
Cellular component	cytoplasm; cytosol; smooth endoplasmic reticulum; endoplasmic reticulum; mitochondrion; extracellular exosome; nucleus; extracellular space; secretory granule lumen; ficolin-1-rich granule lumen; extracellular region
Biological process	male gonad development; 4-hydroxyproline metabolic process; extracellular matrix organization; I-kappaB phosphorylation; protein maturation by protein folding; cell redox homeostasis; reactive oxygen species metabolic process; spermatogenesis; negative regulation of male germ cell proliferation; cellular oxidant detoxification; neutrophil degranulation; response to oxidative stress; hydrogen peroxide catabolic process
Sources:Amigo / QuickGO
Orthologs
Databases	NCBI: entry; OMA: entry
Species	Human	Mouse
Entrez	10549	53381
Ensembl	ENSG00000123131	ENSMUSG00000025289
UniProt	Q13162	O08807
RefSeq (mRNA)	NM_006406	NM_016764; NM_001313711
RefSeq (protein)	NP_006397	NP_001300640; NP_058044
Location (UCSC)	Chr X: 23.66 – 23.69 Mb	Chr X: 154.11 – 154.12 Mb
PubMed search
- Wikidata
View/Edit Human	View/Edit Mouse

Peroxiredoxin-4 is a protein that in humans is encoded by the PRDX4 gene. It is a member of the peroxiredoxin family of antioxidant enzymes.

== Function ==
The protein encoded by this gene is an antioxidant enzyme of the peroxiredoxin family. The protein is localized to the cytoplasm. Peroxidases of the peroxiredoxin family reduce hydrogen peroxide and alkyl hydroperoxides to water and alcohol with the use of reducing equivalents derived from thiol-containing donor molecules. This protein has been found to play a regulatory role in the activation of the transcription factor NF-kappaB.

== Interactions ==
PRDX4 has been shown to interact with Peroxiredoxin 1.
