= PRDX5 =

Protein-coding gene in the species Homo sapiens

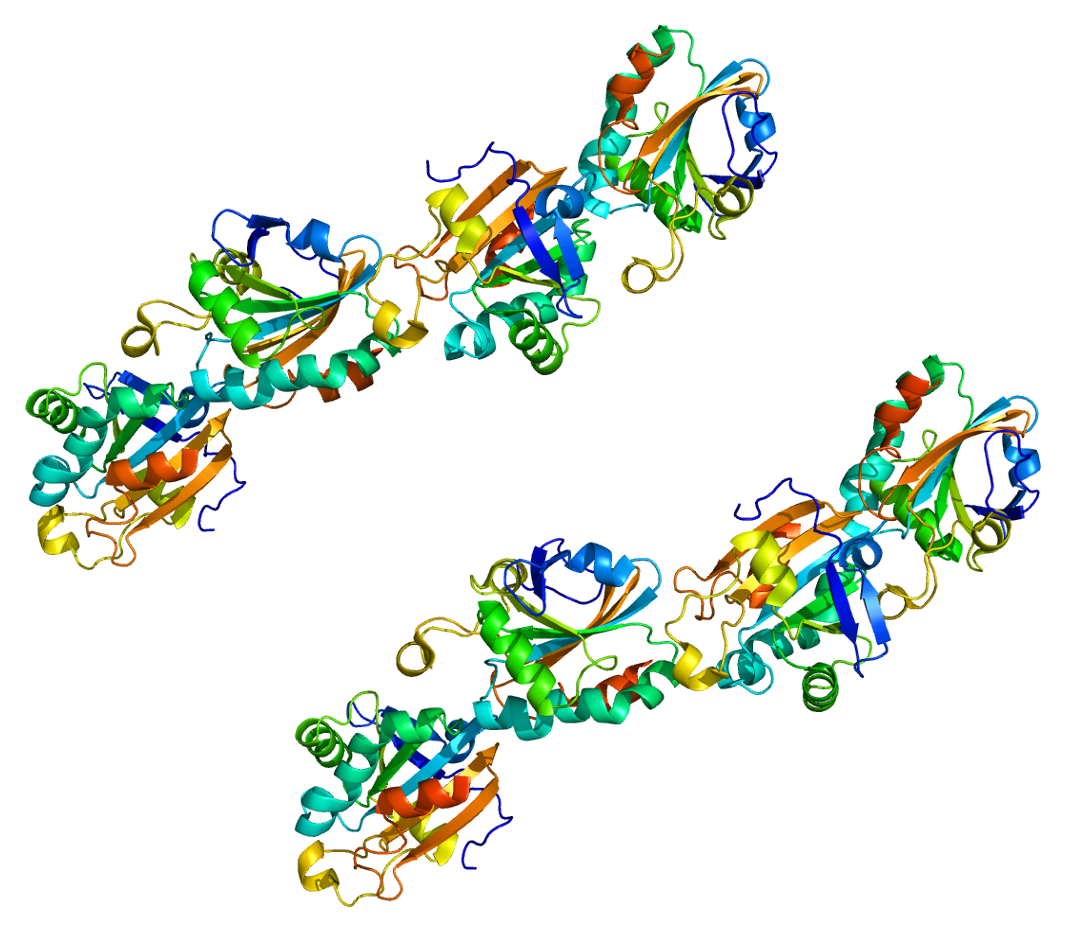

Identifiers
- Aliases: PRDX5, ACR1, AOEB166, B166, HEL-S-55, PLP, PMP20, PRDX6, PRXV, prx-V, SBBI10, peroxiredoxin 5
- External IDs: OMIM: 606583; MGI: 1859821; GeneCards: PRDX5
Available structures
PDB	Ortholog search: PDBe RCSB
PDB	List of PDB id codes 1H4O, 1HD2, 1OC3, 1URM, 2VL2, 2VL3, 2VL9, 3MNG, 4K7I, 4K7N, 4K7O, 4MMM
Enzyme activity
EC #	BRENDA	ExPASy	KEGG	MetaCyc
1.11.1.24	↗	↗	↗	↗

Gene location (Human)
Chr.	Chromosome 11 (human)
Band	11q13.1	Start	64,318,121 bp
Band	11q13.1	End	64,321,811 bp

Gene location (Mouse)
Chr.	Chromosome 19 (mouse)
Band	19 A|19 5.08 cM	Start	6,884,065 bp
Band	19 A|19 5.08 cM	End	6,887,474 bp
RNA expression pattern
Bgee	Human / Mouse (ortholog); Top expressed in: bronchial epithelial cell; epithelium of nasopharynx; palpebral conjunctiva; right uterine tube; mucosa of transverse colon; apex of heart; olfactory zone of nasal mucosa; right adrenal gland; right adrenal cortex; right lobe of thyroid gland / Top expressed in: granulocyte; right kidney; human kidney; dentate gyrus of hippocampal formation granule cell; choroid plexus of fourth ventricle; medial vestibular nucleus; vestibular membrane of cochlear duct; lip; deep cerebellar nuclei; transitional epithelium of urinary bladder; More reference expression data
BioGPS	n/a
Gene ontology
Molecular function	peroxynitrite reductase activity; protein dimerization activity; peroxidase activity; RNA polymerase III transcription regulatory region sequence-specific DNA binding; cysteine-type endopeptidase inhibitor activity involved in apoptotic process; antioxidant activity; peroxiredoxin activity; oxidoreductase activity; signaling receptor binding; thioredoxin peroxidase activity; protein binding
Cellular component	cytoplasm; cytosol; intracellular membrane-bounded organelle; peroxisome; mitochondrial matrix; mitochondrion; perinuclear region of cytoplasm; extracellular exosome; cytoplasmic vesicle; nucleus; extracellular space; peroxisomal matrix
Biological process	positive regulation of collagen biosynthetic process; NADPH oxidation; negative regulation of apoptotic process; response to oxidative stress; cellular response to reactive oxygen species; regulation of apoptosis involved in tissue homeostasis; negative regulation of transcription by RNA polymerase III; negative regulation of oxidoreductase activity; hydrogen peroxide catabolic process; reactive nitrogen species metabolic process; inflammatory response; negative regulation of cysteine-type endopeptidase activity involved in apoptotic process; cellular oxidant detoxification; cell redox homeostasis; apoptotic process; cellular response to oxidative stress
Sources:Amigo / QuickGO
Orthologs
Databases	NCBI: entry; OMA: entry
Species	Human	Mouse
Entrez	25824	54683
Ensembl	ENSG00000126432	ENSMUSG00000024953
UniProt	P30044	P99029
RefSeq (mRNA)	NM_012094; NM_181651; NM_181652; NM_001358511; NM_001358516	NM_012021; NM_001358444
RefSeq (protein)	NP_036226; NP_857634; NP_857635; NP_001345440; NP_001345445	NP_036151; NP_001345373
Location (UCSC)	Chr 11: 64.32 – 64.32 Mb	Chr 19: 6.88 – 6.89 Mb
PubMed search
- Wikidata
View/Edit Human	View/Edit Mouse

Peroxiredoxin-5 (PRDX5), mitochondrial is a protein that in humans is encoded by the PRDX5 gene, located on chromosome 11.

This gene encodes a member of the six-member peroxiredoxin family of antioxidant enzymes. Like the other five members, PRDX5 is widely expressed in tissues but differs by its large subcellular distribution. In human cells, it has been shown that PRDX5 can be localized to mitochondria, peroxisomes, the cytosol, and the nucleus. Human PRDX5 is identified by virtue of the sequence homologies to yeast peroxisomal antioxidant enzyme PMP20.

Biochemically, PRDX5 is a peroxidase that can use cytosolic or mitochondrial thioredoxins to reduce alkyl hydroperoxides or peroxynitrite with high rate constants in the 10^{6} to 10^{7} M^{−1}s^{−1} range, whereas its reaction with hydrogen peroxide is more modest, in the 10^{5} M^{−1}s^{−1} range. So far, PRDX5 has been shown to be a cytoprotective antioxidant enzyme that inhibits endogenous or exogenous peroxide accumulation.

== Structure ==
According to its amino acid sequence, this 2-Cys peroxiredoxin, PRDX5, is the most divergent isoform among mammalian peroxiredoxins, processing only 28% to 30% sequence identity with typical 2-Cys and 1-Cys peroxiredoxins. The divergent amino acid sequence of this atypical peroxiredoxin is reflected in its unique crystal structure. The typical peroxiredoxin is composed of a thioredoxin domain and a C-terminal, whereas PRDX5 has an N-terminal domain and a unique alpha helix replaces a loop structure in the typical thioredoxin domain. In addition, typical 2-Cys or 1-Cys peroxiredoxins are associated as anti-parallel dimers via linkage of two beta-7-strands, whereas a PRDX5 dimer is formed by close contact between an alpha-3-helix of one molecule and an alpha-5-helix from the other molecule.

== Function ==
As a peroxiredoxin, PRDX5 has antioxidative and cytoprotective functions during oxidative stress. Overexpression of human PRDX5 has been shown to inhibit peroxide accumulation induced by TNF-alpha, PDGF, and p53 in NIH3T3 and HeLa cells and reduce cell death by exogenous peroxide in multiple organelles of CHO, HT-22, and human tendon cells. Meanwhile, reduced expression of PRDX5 induces cell susceptibility to oxidative damage and etoposide, doxorubicin, MPP^{+}, and peroxide-induced apoptosis. In addition, expressing human PRDX5 in other organisms or tissues such as yeast, mouse brain, and Xenopus embryos also leads to protection against oxidative stress. PRDX5 in Drosophila melanogaster has been shown to promote longevity in addition to antioxidant activity.

== Clinical significance ==
By examining 98 stroke patients, Kunze et al. showed an inverse correlation between stroke progression and PRDX5 concentration, suggesting that plasma PRDX5 can be a potential biomarker of inflammation in acute stroke. In human breast cancer cells, knockdown of transcription factor, GATA1, led to increased expression of PRDX5 and inhibition of apoptosis. A substantial increase in PRDX5 expression has been observed in astrocytes in multiple sclerosis lesion. PRDX5 has also been identified as a candidate risk gene for the inflammatory disease, sarcoidosis.

== Interactions ==
Transcription factor GATA-binding protein 1 can bind to the PRDX5 gene and lead to increased expression of PRDX5. PRDX5 has been shown to physically interact with PRDX1, PRDX2, PRDX6, SOD1, and PARK7 in at least two independent high-throughput proteomic analyses.
