= PRDX6 =

Protein-coding gene in humans

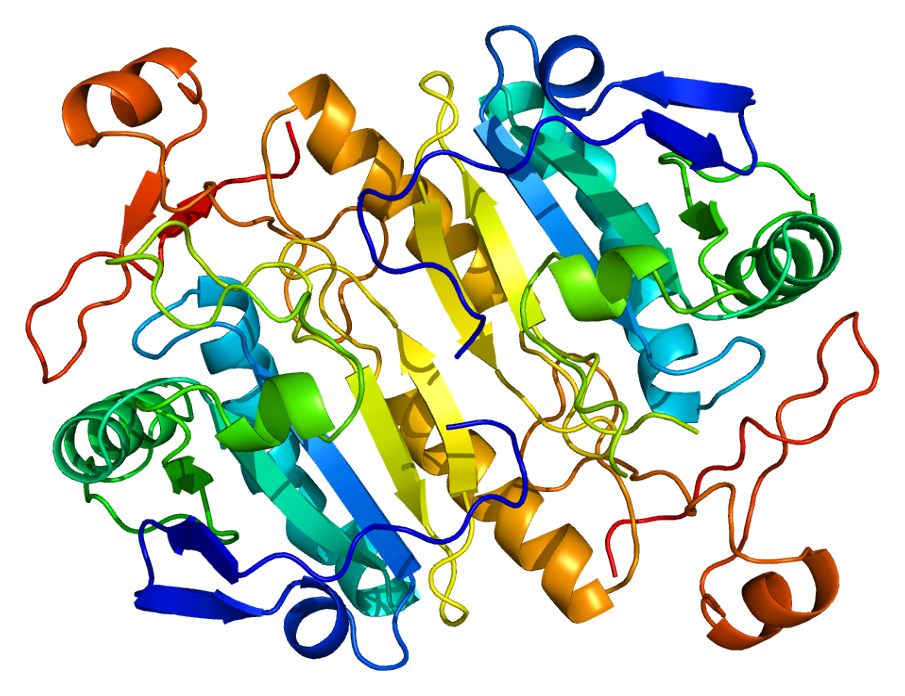

Identifiers
- Aliases: PRDX6, 1-Cys, AOP2, HEL-S-128m, NSGPx, PRX, aiPLA2, p29, peroxiredoxin 6, LPCAT-5
- External IDs: OMIM: 602316; MGI: 894320; GeneCards: PRDX6
Available structures
PDB	Ortholog search: PDBe RCSB
PDB	List of PDB id codes 1PRX, 5B6N, 5B6M
Enzyme activity
EC #	BRENDA	ExPASy	KEGG	MetaCyc
1.11.1.9	↗	↗	↗	↗
1.11.1.27	↗	↗	↗	↗
2.3.1.23	↗	↗	↗	↗
3.1.1.4	↗	↗	↗	↗

Gene location (Human)
Chr.	Chromosome 1 (human)
Band	1q25.1	Start	173,477,330 bp
Band	1q25.1	End	173,488,815 bp

Gene location (Mouse)
Chr.	Chromosome 1 (mouse)
Band	1 H2.1|1 69.75 cM	Start	161,067,682 bp
Band	1 H2.1|1 69.75 cM	End	161,078,789 bp
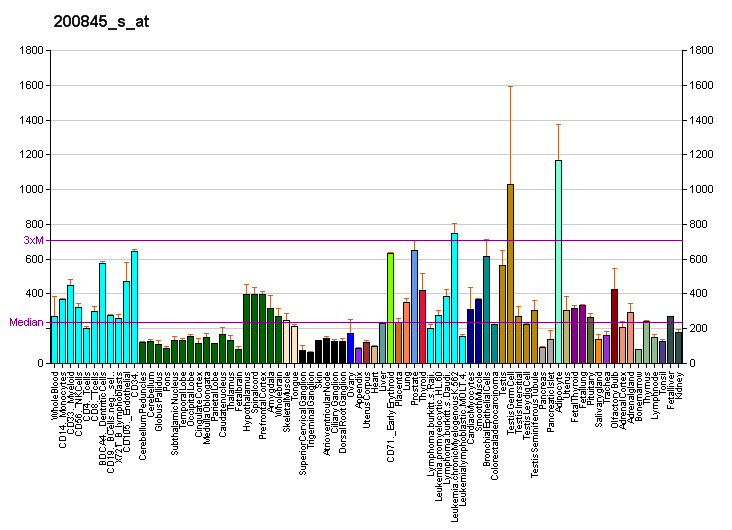

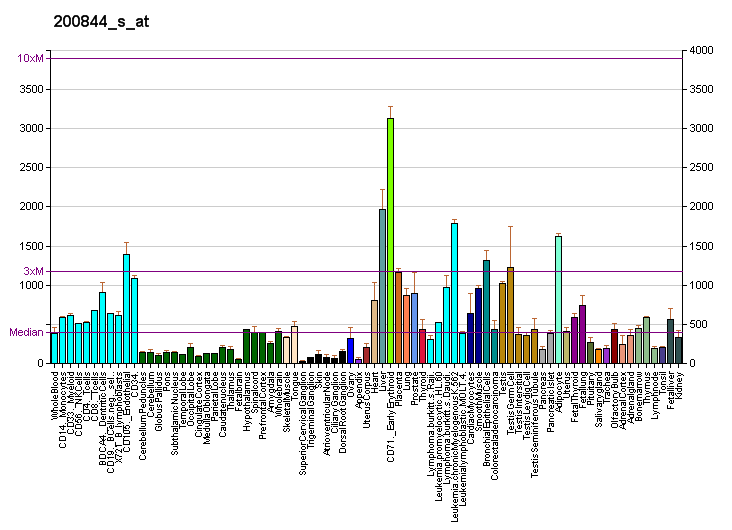
RNA expression pattern
Bgee	Human / Mouse (ortholog); Top expressed in: corpus epididymis; gastrocnemius muscle; gastric mucosa; amniotic fluid; abdominal fat; right auricle of heart; peritoneum; mucosa of transverse colon; germinal epithelium; rectum / Top expressed in: left colon; olfactory epithelium; right lung; right lung lobe; corneal stroma; gastrula; seminal vesicula; superior surface of tongue; epiblast; left lobe of liver; More reference expression data
BioGPS	More reference expression data
Gene ontology
Molecular function	peroxidase activity; catalytic activity; protein binding; peroxiredoxin activity; oxidoreductase activity; hydrolase activity; ubiquitin protein ligase binding; antioxidant activity; cadherin binding; glutathione peroxidase activity; protein homodimerization activity; calcium-independent phospholipase A2 activity; phospholipase A2 activity
Cellular component	cytoplasm; cytosol; membrane; lysosome; extracellular exosome; extracellular region; extracellular space; azurophil granule lumen; nucleus; perinuclear region of cytoplasm
Biological process	lipid metabolism; lipid catabolic process; hydrogen peroxide catabolic process; metabolism; cell redox homeostasis; neutrophil degranulation; response to oxidative stress; cellular response to oxidative stress; glycerophospholipid catabolic process; cellular oxidant detoxification; positive regulation of mRNA splicing, via spliceosome
Sources:Amigo / QuickGO
Orthologs
Databases	NCBI: entry; OMA: entry
Species	Human	Mouse
Entrez	9588	11758
Ensembl	ENSG00000117592	ENSMUSG00000026701
UniProt	P30041	O08709
RefSeq (mRNA)	NM_004905	NM_001303408; NM_007453
RefSeq (protein)	NP_004896	NP_001290337; NP_031479
Location (UCSC)	Chr 1: 173.48 – 173.49 Mb	Chr 1: 161.07 – 161.08 Mb
PubMed search
- Wikidata
View/Edit Human	View/Edit Mouse

Peroxiredoxin-6 is a protein that in humans is encoded by the PRDX6 gene. It is a member of the peroxiredoxin family of antioxidant enzymes. Peroxiredoxin 6 is widely distributed in several organs, especially the lungs.

== Function ==
The protein encoded by this gene is a member of the thiol-specific antioxidant protein family. This protein is a bifunctional enzyme with two distinct active sites. It is involved in redox regulation of the cell; it can reduce H(2)O(2) and short chain organic, fatty acid, and phospholipid hydroperoxides. It may play a role in the regulation of phospholipid turnover as well as in protection against oxidative injury.
