= German submarine U-15 =

U-15 may refer to one of the following German submarines:

- SM U-15 (Germany), was a Type U 13 submarine launched in 1911 and that served in the First World War until sunk on 9 August 1914
  - During the First World War, Germany also had these submarines with similar names:
    - SM UB-15, a Type UB I submarine launched in 1915; transferred to Austria-Hungary on 14 June 1915 and became SM U-11 (Austria-Hungary); broken up in Pola in 1920
    - SM UC-15, a Type UC I submarine launched in 1915 and lost in November 1916
- German submarine U-15 (1936), a Type IIB submarine that served in the Second World War and was sunk on 30 January 1940
- German submarine U-15 (S194), a Type 206 submarine of the Bundesmarine that was launched in 1974 and is still in service
