= Peroxiredoxin 2 =

Protein found in humans

PRDX2
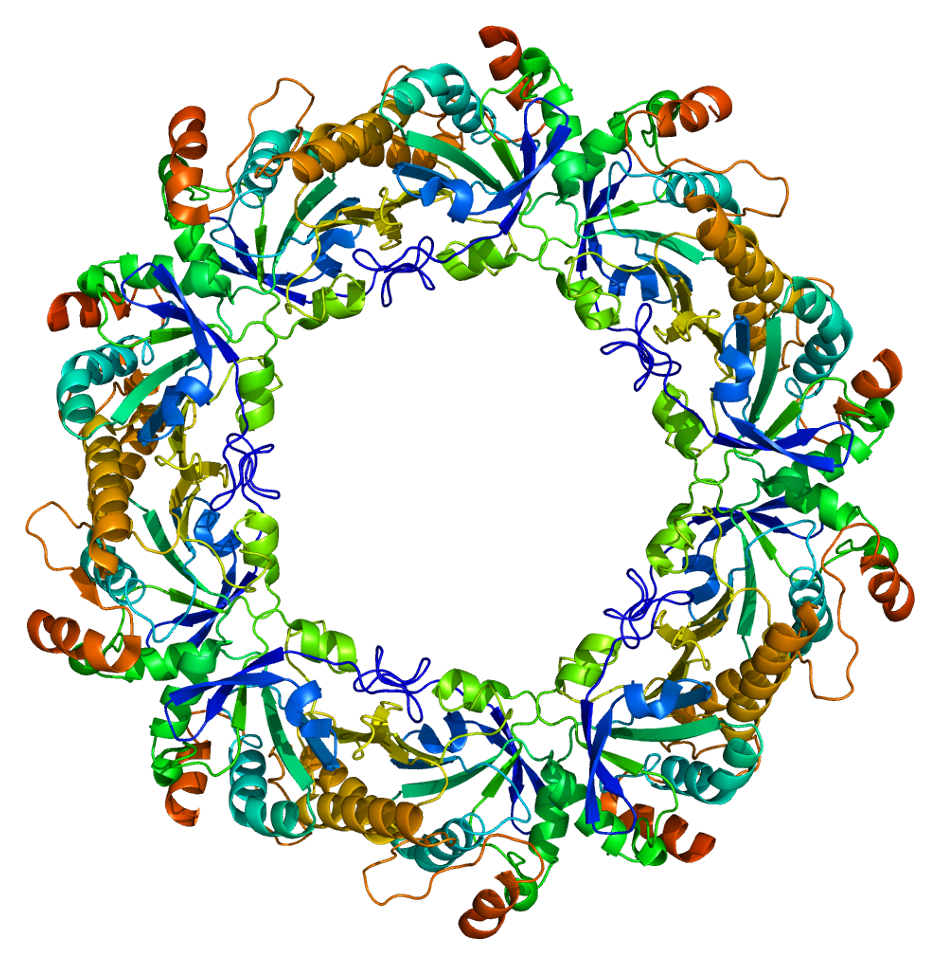

Identifiers
- Aliases: PRDX2, HEL-S-2a, NKEF-B, NKEFB, PRP, PRX2, PRXII, PTX1, TDPX1, TPX1, TSA, Peroxiredoxin 2
- External IDs: OMIM: 600538; MGI: 109486; GeneCards: PRDX2
Available structures
PDB	Ortholog search: PDBe RCSB
PDB	List of PDB id codes 1QMV
Enzyme activity
EC #	BRENDA	ExPASy	KEGG	MetaCyc
1.11.1.24	↗	↗	↗	↗

Gene location (Human)
Chr.	Chromosome 19 (human)
Band	19p13.13	Start	12,796,820 bp
Band	19p13.13	End	12,801,800 bp

Gene location (Mouse)
Chr.	Chromosome 8 (mouse)
Band	8 C3|8 41.4 cM	Start	85,696,216 bp
Band	8 C3|8 41.4 cM	End	85,701,463 bp
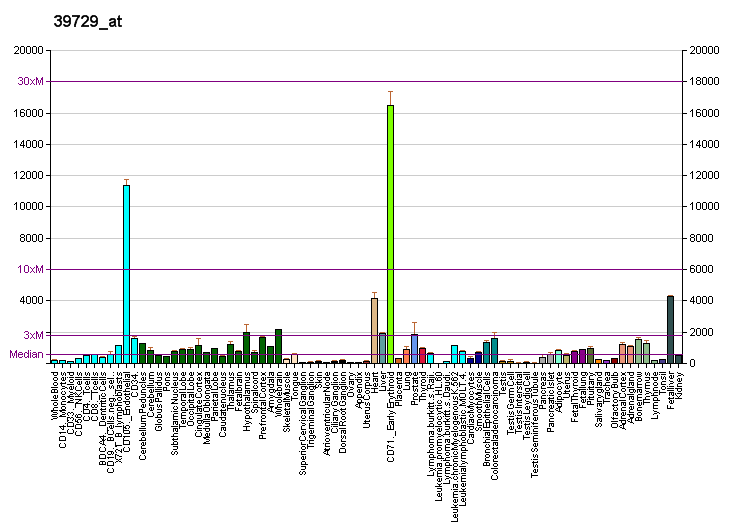
RNA expression pattern
Bgee	Human / Mouse (ortholog); Top expressed in: lateral nuclear group of thalamus; trabecular bone; pars compacta; pars reticulata; external globus pallidus; pons; right ventricle; apex of heart; right adrenal cortex; left adrenal gland / Top expressed in: ventricular zone; embryo; dentate gyrus of hippocampal formation granule cell; embryo; right kidney; superior frontal gyrus; lip; yolk sac; muscle of thigh; neural layer of retina; More reference expression data
BioGPS	More reference expression data
Gene ontology
Molecular function	oxidoreductase activity; antioxidant activity; peroxiredoxin activity; peroxidase activity; protein binding; thioredoxin peroxidase activity
Cellular component	cytoplasm; extracellular exosome; cytosol
Biological process	regulation of apoptotic process; negative regulation of apoptotic process; hydrogen peroxide catabolic process; cell redox homeostasis; response to oxidative stress; cellular response to oxidative stress; removal of superoxide radicals; respiratory burst involved in inflammatory response; regulation of hydrogen peroxide metabolic process; positive regulation of blood coagulation; negative regulation of lipopolysaccharide-mediated signaling pathway; negative regulation of NF-kappaB transcription factor activity; response to lipopolysaccharide; T cell proliferation; hydrogen peroxide metabolic process; negative regulation of T cell differentiation; thymus development; homeostasis of number of cells; negative regulation of reactive oxygen species metabolic process; negative regulation of extrinsic apoptotic signaling pathway; negative regulation of extrinsic apoptotic signaling pathway in absence of ligand; leukocyte activation
Sources:Amigo / QuickGO
Orthologs
Databases	NCBI: entry; OMA: entry
Species	Human	Mouse
Entrez	7001	21672
Ensembl	ENSG00000167815	ENSMUSG00000005161
UniProt	P32119	Q61171
RefSeq (mRNA)	NM_181738; NM_005809; NM_181737	NM_011563; NM_001317385
RefSeq (protein)	NP_005800	NP_001304314; NP_035693
Location (UCSC)	Chr 19: 12.8 – 12.8 Mb	Chr 8: 85.7 – 85.7 Mb
PubMed search
- Wikidata
View/Edit Human	View/Edit Mouse

Peroxiredoxin-2 is a protein that in humans is encoded by the PRDX2 gene.

PRDX2 encodes a member of the peroxiredoxin family of antioxidant enzymes, which reduce hydrogen peroxide and alkyl hydroperoxides. The encoded protein may play an antioxidant protective role in cells, and may contribute to the antiviral activity of CD8(+) T-cells. This protein may have a proliferative effect and play a role in cancer development or progression. The crystal structure of this protein has been resolved to 0.27 nm (= 2.7 angstroms). Transcript variants encoding distinct isoforms have been identified for this gene.
