= PRDX3 =

Protein-coding gene in the species Homo sapiens

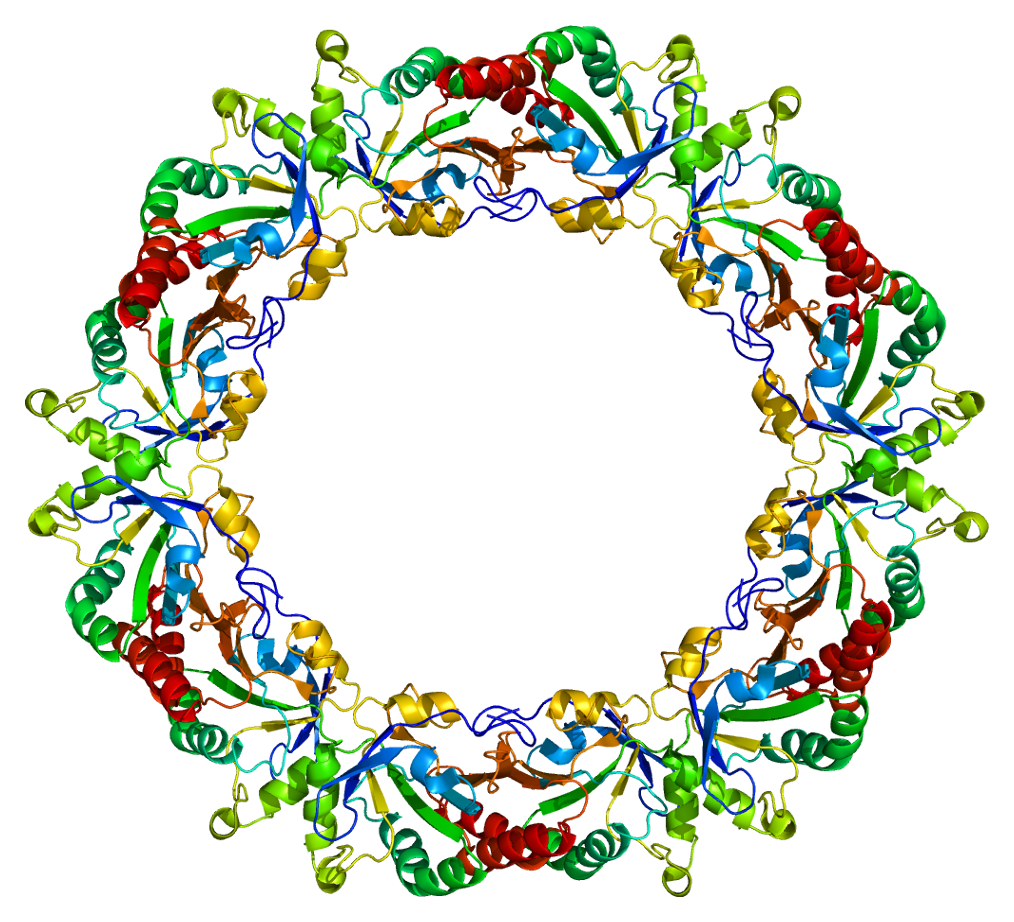

Identifiers
- Aliases: PRDX3, AOP-1, AOP1, HBC189, MER5, PRO1748, SP-22, prx-III, peroxiredoxin 3, SCAR32, PPPCD
- External IDs: OMIM: 604769; MGI: 88034; GeneCards: PRDX3
Available structures
| PDB | Ortholog search: PDBe RCSB |
| PDB | List of PDB id codes 5JCG |
Enzyme activity
| EC # | BRENDA | ExPASy | KEGG | MetaCyc |
|---|---|---|---|---|
| 1.11.1.24 | ↗ | ↗ | ↗ | ↗ |

Gene location (Human)
| Chr. | Chromosome 10 (human) |
| Band | 10q26.11 | Start | 119,167,720 bp |
| Band | 10q26.11 | End | 119,178,812 bp |

Gene location (Mouse)
| Chr. | Chromosome 19 (mouse) |
| Band | 19 D3|19 56.52 cM | Start | 60,852,489 bp |
| Band | 19 D3|19 56.52 cM | End | 60,862,994 bp |
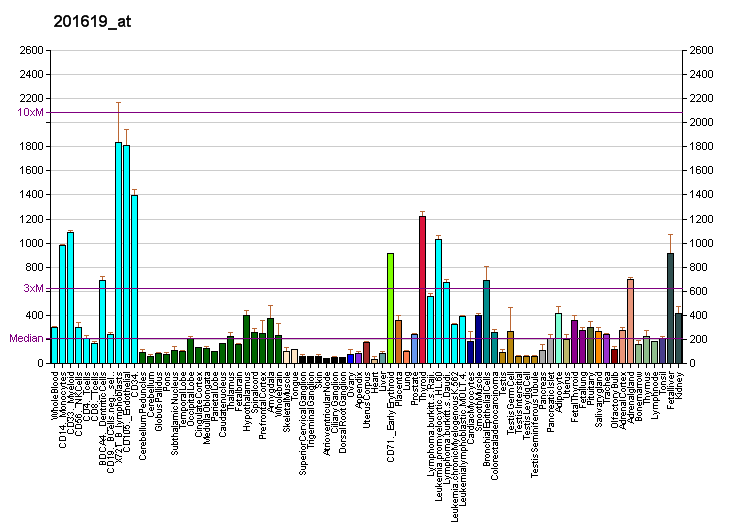
RNA expression pattern
| Bgee | Human / Mouse (ortholog); Top expressed in: right adrenal cortex; left adrenal gland; left adrenal cortex; right ventricle; biceps brachii; Skeletal muscle tissue of biceps brachii; oocyte; islet of Langerhans; gastrocnemius muscle; secondary oocyte / Top expressed in: adrenal gland; digastric muscle; right ventricle; temporal muscle; right kidney; soleus muscle; sternocleidomastoid muscle; myocardium of ventricle; brown adipose tissue; triceps brachii muscle; More reference expression data |
| BioGPS | More reference expression data |
Gene ontology
| Molecular function | peroxidase activity; cysteine-type endopeptidase inhibitor activity involved in apoptotic process; kinase binding; protein C-terminus binding; protein binding; antioxidant activity; alkyl hydroperoxide reductase activity; peroxiredoxin activity; oxidoreductase activity; protein kinase binding; thioredoxin peroxidase activity; identical protein binding |
| Cellular component | cytosol; myelin sheath; mitochondrial matrix; mitochondrion; IkappaB kinase complex; cytoplasm; endosome; early endosome; protein-containing complex |
| Biological process | myeloid cell differentiation; peptidyl-cysteine oxidation; mitochondrion organization; negative regulation of apoptotic process; response to oxidative stress; regulation of mitochondrial membrane potential; cellular response to reactive oxygen species; response to lipopolysaccharide; maternal placenta development; positive regulation of NF-kappaB transcription factor activity; positive regulation of cell population proliferation; hydrogen peroxide catabolic process; response to hydrogen peroxide; negative regulation of kinase activity; negative regulation of cysteine-type endopeptidase activity involved in apoptotic process; cellular oxidant detoxification; cell redox homeostasis; apoptotic process; cellular response to oxidative stress |
Sources:Amigo / QuickGO
Orthologs
| Databases | NCBI: entry; OMA: entry |
| Species | Human | Mouse |
| Entrez | 10935 | 11757 |
| Ensembl | ENSG00000165672 | ENSMUSG00000024997 |
| UniProt | P30048 | P20108 |
| RefSeq (mRNA) | NM_001302272; NM_006793; NM_014098 | NM_007452 |
| RefSeq (protein) | NP_001289201; NP_006784 | NP_031478 |
| Location (UCSC) | Chr 10: 119.17 – 119.18 Mb | Chr 19: 60.85 – 60.86 Mb |
| PubMed search |
- Wikidata
| View/Edit Human | View/Edit Mouse |

Thioredoxin-dependent peroxide reductase, mitochondrial is an enzyme that in humans is encoded by the PRDX3 gene. It is a member of the peroxiredoxin family of antioxidant enzymes.

== Function ==
This gene encodes a protein with antioxidant function and is localized in the mitochondrion. This gene shows significant nucleotide sequence similarity to the gene coding for the C22 subunit of Salmonella typhimurium alkylhydroperoxide reductase. Expression of this gene product in E. coli deficient in the C22-subunit gene rescued resistance of the bacteria to alkylhydroperoxide. The human and mouse genes are highly conserved, and they map to the regions syntenic between mouse and human chromosomes. Sequence comparisons with recently cloned mammalian homologues suggest that these genes consist of a family that is responsible for regulation of cellular proliferation, differentiation, and antioxidant functions. Two transcript variants encoding two different isoforms have been found for this gene.

== Interactions ==
PRDX3 has been shown to interact with MAP3K13.

== Clinical significance ==
It has been demonstrated that serum peroxiredoxin 3 can be a valuable biomarker for the diagnosis and assessment of hepatocellular carcinoma It has been shown that peroxiredoxin proteins protect MCF-7 breast cancer cells against doxorubicin-mediated toxicity. Additionally, it has been shown that peroxiredoxin 3 is overexpressed in prostate cancer and promotes cancer cell survival by defending cells against the damages incurred by oxidative stress.
