= Uppland Runic Inscription 15 =

Coordinates: 59°16′21″N 17°44′54″E

- Ingeborgsstenen
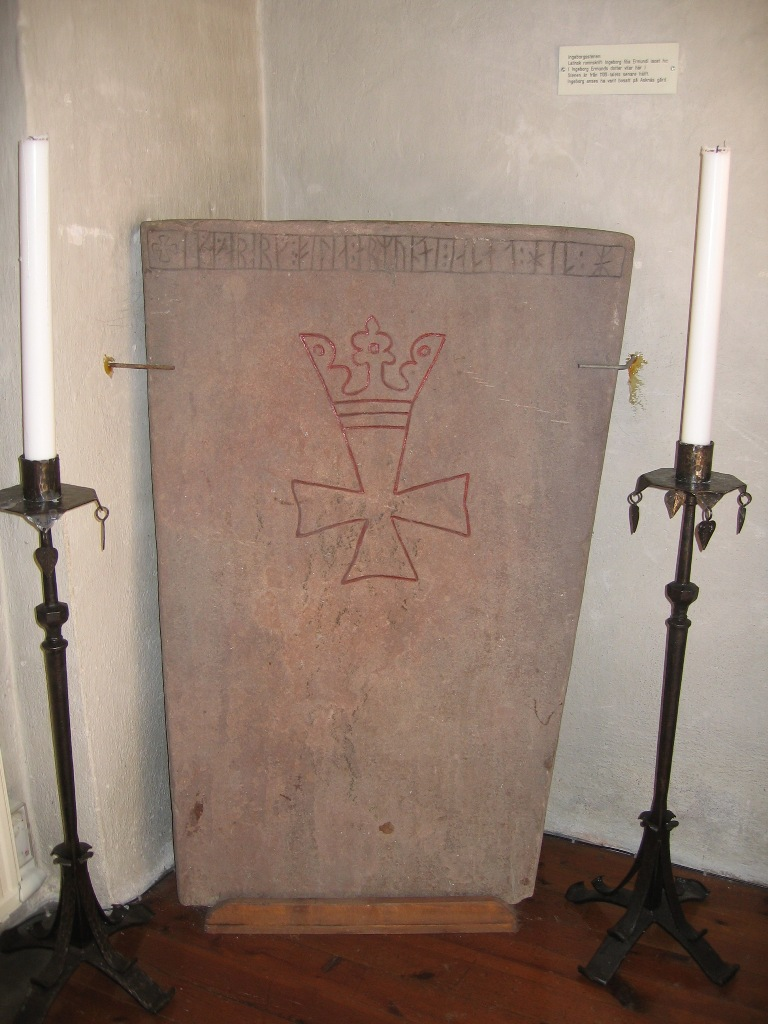
- Material: Reddish sandstone
- Height: 1.27 metres (4 ft 2 in)
- Width: 0.86–0.68 metres (2 ft 10 in – 2 ft 3 in)
- Writing: Runes
- Created: Second half of the 12th century
- Discovered: Ekerö, Uppland, Sweden
- Present location: Ekerö church, Ekerö, Uppland, Sweden
- Rundata ID: U 15

Text – Native
- Runic : ᛁᚵᚵᛅᛒᛆᚱᚵ᛫ᚠᛁᛚᛁᛆ᛫ᛅᚱᛘᚢᚿᛆᛁ᛫ᛁᛆᚳᛆᛐ᛫ᚼᛁᚳ; Latin : Ingeborg filia Ermundi iacet hic

Translation
- Ingeborg, daughter of Ermund rests here

Runic inscription U 15, also known as the Ingeborg Stone (Swedish: Ingeborgsstenen) is a grave slab located inside Ekerö church. It was previously part of the stone floor in the church but has since been put on display in a side chapel. The inscription is written in Latin using the Runic alphabet

== History ==
The stone is believed to have been raised in the latter half of the 12th century, and placed in the church cemetery, before being placed in the floor of the choir sometime during the 17th century. When the church underwent reparation 1880-81 the stone was moved to its current location at the southern end of the transept.

== See also ==
- List of runestones
