= Small nucleolar RNA SNORD15 =

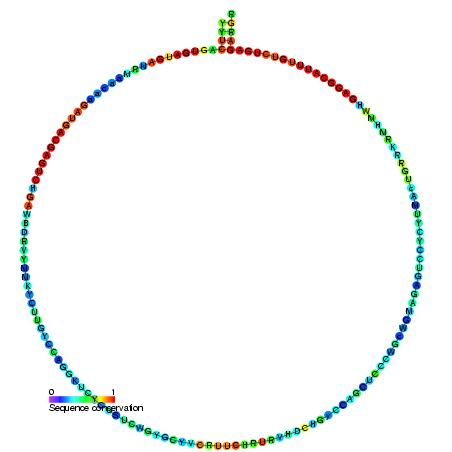
- Predicted secondary structure and sequence conservation of SNORD15

Identifiers
- Symbol: SNORD15
- Alt. Symbols: U15
- Rfam: RF00067

Other data
- RNA type: Gene; snRNA; snoRNA; CD-box
- Domain: Eukaryota
- GO: GO:0005730 GO:0006396
- SO: SO:0000593
- PDB structures: PDBe

In molecular biology, SNORD15 (also known as U15) is a non-coding RNA (ncRNA) molecule which functions in the modification of small nuclear RNAs (snRNAs, also a type of ncRNAs). This type of modifying RNA is usually located in the nucleolus of the eukaryotic cell which is a major site of snRNA biogenesis. It is known as a small nucleolar RNA (snoRNA) and also often referred to as a guide RNA.

U15 belongs to the C/D box class of snoRNAs which contain the conserved sequence motifs known as the C box (UGAUGA) and the D box (CUGA). Most of the members of the box C/D family function in directing site-specific 2'-O-methylation of substrate RNAs. U15 is predicted to guide the 2'O-ribose methylation of 28S ribosomal RNA (rRNA) residue A3764.

In humans there are two closely related copies of the U15 snoRNA (called SNORD15A and SNORD15B). They are both encoded in the introns of the ribosomal protein S3. In Xenopus laevis it is located within the introns of ribosomal protein S1

snoR75 from Arabidopsis thaliana and homologues in rice Oryza sativa and other plants are alternatively known as U15, and, despite a significantly shorter sequence length, appear to be related.
