= Peroxiredoxin 1 =

Protein found in humans

PRDX1
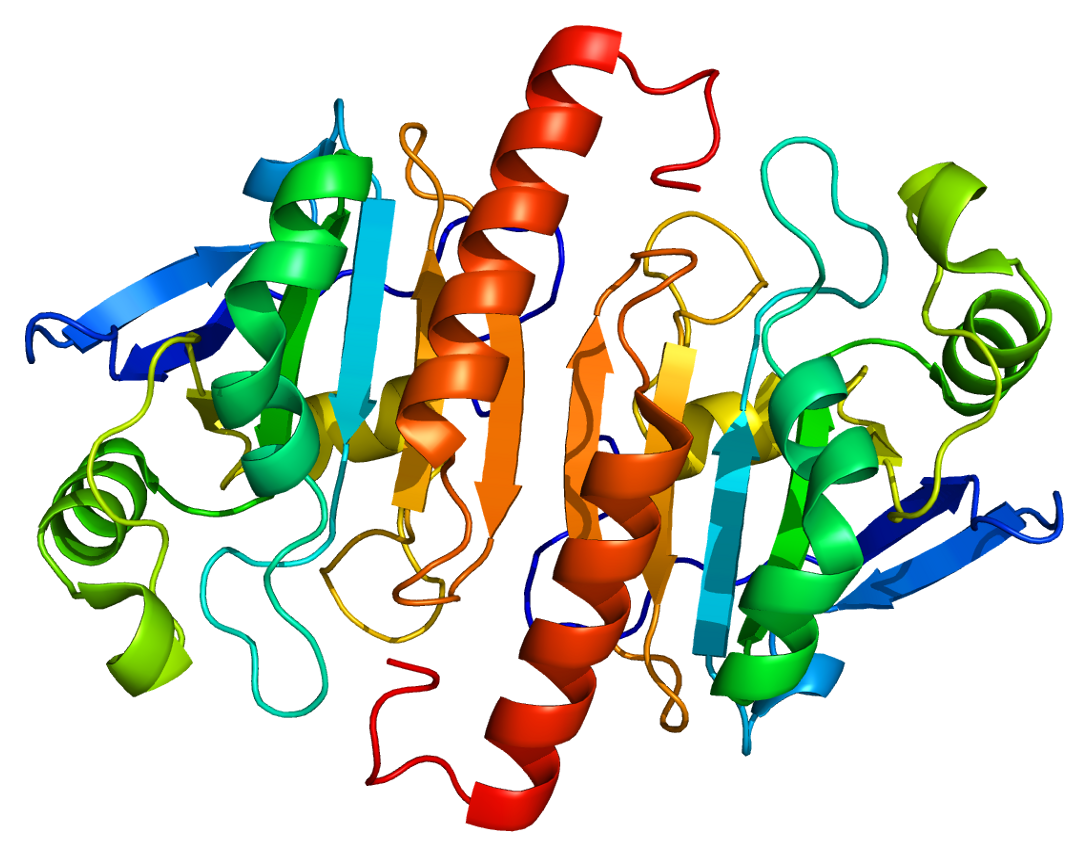

Identifiers
- Aliases: PRDX1, MSP23, NKEF-A, NKEFA, PAG, PAGA, PAGB, PRX1, PRXI, TDPX2, Peroxiredoxin 1
- External IDs: OMIM: 176763; MGI: 99523; GeneCards: PRDX1
Available structures
| PDB | Ortholog search: PDBe RCSB |
| PDB | List of PDB id codes 2RII, 3HY2, 4XCS |
Enzyme activity
| EC # | BRENDA | ExPASy | KEGG | MetaCyc |
|---|---|---|---|---|
| 1.11.1.24 | ↗ | ↗ | ↗ | ↗ |

Gene location (Human)
| Chr. | Chromosome 1 (human) |
| Band | 1p34.1 | Start | 45,510,914 bp |
| Band | 1p34.1 | End | 45,542,732 bp |

Gene location (Mouse)
| Chr. | Chromosome 4 (mouse) |
| Band | 4 D1|4 53.28 cM | Start | 116,542,741 bp |
| Band | 4 D1|4 53.28 cM | End | 116,558,019 bp |
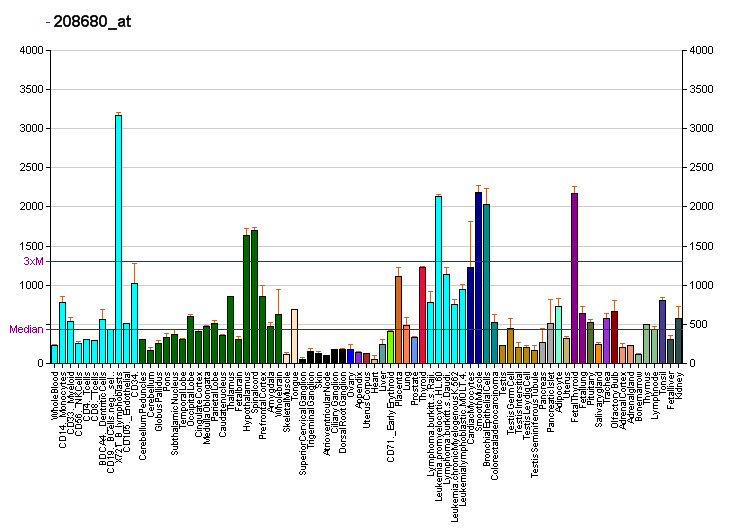
RNA expression pattern
| Bgee | Human / Mouse (ortholog); Top expressed in: right lobe of thyroid gland; left lobe of thyroid gland; nasal epithelium; olfactory zone of nasal mucosa; palpebral conjunctiva; C1 segment; mucosa of esophagus; ganglionic eminence; gums; gingival epithelium / Top expressed in: vas deferens; primitive streak; endothelial cell of lymphatic vessel; right kidney; Gonadal ridge; efferent ductule; lobe of prostate; stroma of bone marrow; iris; epiblast; More reference expression data |
| BioGPS | More reference expression data |
Gene ontology
| Molecular function | antioxidant activity; protein binding; peroxiredoxin activity; identical protein binding; oxidoreductase activity; thioredoxin peroxidase activity; peroxidase activity; RNA binding; cadherin binding |
| Cellular component | cytoplasm; cytosol; melanosome; myelin sheath; mitochondrion; extracellular exosome; nucleus; extracellular matrix; extracellular space |
| Biological process | skeletal system development; removal of superoxide radicals; response to oxidative stress; retina homeostasis; erythrocyte homeostasis; hydrogen peroxide catabolic process; cell population proliferation; regulation of stress-activated MAPK cascade; natural killer cell mediated cytotoxicity; cell redox homeostasis; natural killer cell activation; response to reactive oxygen species; cellular response to oxidative stress; regulation of NIK/NF-kappaB signaling; leukocyte activation |
Sources:Amigo / QuickGO
Orthologs
| Databases | NCBI: entry; OMA: entry |
| Species | Human | Mouse |
| Entrez | 5052 | 18477 |
| Ensembl | ENSG00000117450 | ENSMUSG00000028691 |
| UniProt | Q06830 | P35700 |
| RefSeq (mRNA) | NM_181697; NM_001202431; NM_002574; NM_181696 | NM_011034 |
| RefSeq (protein) | NP_001189360; NP_002565; NP_859047; NP_859048 | NP_035164 |
| Location (UCSC) | Chr 1: 45.51 – 45.54 Mb | Chr 4: 116.54 – 116.56 Mb |
| PubMed search |
- Wikidata
| View/Edit Human | View/Edit Mouse |

Peroxiredoxin-1 is a protein that in humans is encoded by the PRDX1 gene.

== Function ==
This gene encodes a member of the peroxiredoxin family of antioxidant enzymes, which reduce hydrogen peroxide and alkyl hydroperoxides. The encoded protein may play an antioxidant protective role in cells, and may contribute to the antiviral activity of CD8(+) T-cells. This protein may have a proliferative effect and play a role in cancer development or progression. Three transcript variants encoding the same protein have been identified for this gene.

== Interactions ==
Peroxiredoxin 1 has been shown to interact with PRDX4. A chemoproteomic approach has revealed that peroxiredoxin 1 is the main target of theonellasterone.

== Clinical significance ==
As enzymes that combat oxidative stress, peroxiredoxins play an important role in health and disease. Peroxiredoxin 1 and peroxiredoxin 2 have been shown to be released by some cells when stimulated by LPS or TNF-alpha. The released peroxiredoxin can then act to produce inflammatory cytokines. The levels of peroxiredoxin 1 are elevated in pancreatic cancer and it can potentially act as a marker for the diagnosis and prognosis of this disease. In some types of cancer, peroxiredoxin 1 has been determined to act as a tumor suppressor and other studies show that peroxiredoxin 1 is overexpressed in certain human cancers. A recent study has found that peroxiredoxin 1 may play a role in tumorigenesis by regulating the mTOR/p70S6K pathway in esophageal squamous cell carcinoma. The expression patterns of peroxiredoxin 1 along with peroxiredoxin 4 are involved in human lung cancer malignancy. It has also been shown that peroxiredoxin 1 may be an important player in the pathogenesis of acute respiratory distress syndrome because of its role in promoting inflammation.
