= Jeffrey Skolnick =

American computational biologist

- Born: Brooklyn, New York
- Known for: computational techniques for protein structure analysis
- Awards: 1983 Alfred P. Sloan Research Fellowship; 2001 American Association for the Advancement of Science Fellow; 2004 Biophysical Society Fellow; 2003 Stockton Kimball Award; University at Buffalo, Medical Alumni Award; St. Louis Academy of Science Fellow; Southeastern University Research Alliance 2014 Distinguished Scientist Award
- Scientific career
- Fields: Systems biology; Computational biology; Bioinformatics; Cancer metabolomics; Protein structure prediction; Protein evolution; Drug design; Simulation of virtual cells
- Workplaces: Georgia Tech Research Institute; Buffalo Center of Excellence in Bioinformatics; Structural Biology, University at Buffalo; Donald Danforth Plant Science Center; Advanced Study Institute, The Hebrew University, Jerusalem; Institute of Theoretical Physics, UCSB; The Scripps Research Institute; Washington University in St. Louis; Intellimedix
- Thesis: Investigations on a Rod Like Polyelectrolyte Model (1978)
- Doctoral advisor: Professor Marshall Fixman; Ph.D.
- Website: www.biology.gatech.edu/people/jeffrey-skolnick

Jeffrey Skolnick is an American computational biologist. He is currently a Georgia Institute of Technology School of Biology Professor, the Director of the Center for the Study of Systems Biology, the Mary and Maisie Gibson Chair, the Georgia Research Alliance Eminent Scholar in Computational Systems Biology, the Director of the Integrative BioSystems Institute, and was previously the Scientific Advisor at Intellimedix.

He has focused on the development of computational algorithms and their application to proteomes for the prediction of protein structure and function, the prediction of small molecule ligand-protein interactions with applications to drug discovery, the prediction of off-target uses of existing drugs, and the exploration of the interplay between protein physics and evolution in determining protein structure and function. He is a pioneer in the field of protein structure prediction, including the development of CABS and CAS methods of lattice based conformation sampling, and the algorithms Touchstone II and TASSER.

Skolnick is most known for demonstrating that the number of ligand binding pockets in proteins is quite small, thereby justifying the likelihood that large scale drug repurposing will work. This combined with the ability to use predicted as well as experimental structures in virtual ligand screening at higher accuracy and precision than existing approaches will enable FDA approved drugs with novel mechanisms of action to be identified computationally with a high likelihood of experimental success.

He is also known for his unique teaching methodology and interactive pedagogy to simplify the comprehension of complex concepts in computational chemistry.

== Major Discoveries ==
=== Completeness of the library of protein structures and interactions ===
Skolnick was first to demonstrate that the library of single domain protein structures is likely complete and that the observed folds in nature arise from the confinement of dense polymer chains. He further demonstrated that the confinement of these dense polymer chains plus hydrodynamic interactions were the dominant contributor to diffusive processes in cells. Moreover, that the hydrodynamic interactions introduced large scale temporal and spatial correlations that may have important functional consequences.

=== Ligand homology modeling ===
He also pioneered the field of ligand homology modeling with his threading based, FINDSITE approach for protein function inference, binding site prediction and virtual ligand screening. The research showed that remotely related proteins identified by threading often share a common ligand binding site occupied by chemically similar ligands that contain strongly conserved anchor functional groups as well as a variable region that accounts for their binding specificity. These insights enable low-resolution predicted structures to be used for ligand screening/binding pose prediction, with comparable accuracy as with high-resolution experimental structures. In virtual ligand screening, the latest version, FINDSITEcomb, was shown to work far better than more traditional virtual screening approaches on both predicted and high resolution experimental structures.

=== TASSER protein structure prediction ===
He also developed the TASSER protein structure prediction approach, whose variants were among the top performers in CASP in the 2000s and the basis for the I-TASSER service. TASSER was among the first methods whose models were closer to the native structure than the starting template.

=== Odijk-Skolnick-Fixman electrostatic persistence length ===
Skolnick's Ph.D. thesis " “Investigations on a Rod Like Polyelectrolyte Model", along with Fixman and Odijk, developed a theory for the electrostatic persistence length in polyelectrolytes now known as the Odijk-Skolnick-Fixman electrostatic persistence length which is still considered the classical benchmark.

== Education ==
Skolnick graduated summa cum laude from Washington University in 1975 with a Bachelor of Arts degree in chemistry. After Washington University, he moved on to Yale, where he graduated with a Master of Philosophy in Chemistry in 1977 and a Ph.D. in Chemistry just one year later in 1978.

His Ph.D. thesis, “Investigations on a Rod Like Polyelectrolyte Model”, focused on polymer statistical mechanics with Dr. Marshall Fixman. The methods described by Skolnick and Fixman and independently developed by Theo Odijk are still used as the basis for the electrostatic persistence length of polyelectrolytes.

== Academic Recognition ==
=== Awards ===
Skolnick has been recognized as a Fellow with the American Association for the Advancement of Science, the Biophysical Society, and the St. Louis Academy of Science. He has also been awarded an Alfred P. Sloan Research Fellowship. Skolnick was awarded the Southeastern Universities Research Association’s (SURA) 2014 Distinguished Scientist Award. In 2020, Skolnick was appointed Regents Professor in the University of Georgia system, the highest honor for a professor acknowledging their national and international scholarship. He was selected for a Regents Professor renewal in 2026.

=== Journals and Editorial Boards ===
Dates	Journal
2012–present	Editorial Board, PeerJ
2012–present	Structural Biology Section Editor, Biology Direct
2011–present	Editorial Board, Current Bioinformatics
2005–present	Editorial Board, Biology Direct
2005–present	Editorial Board, Protein Science
1998–present	Editorial Board, Proteins

He is also a cofounder of an early stage structural proteomics company, GeneFormatics, and his software has been commercialized by Tripos.

== Professional career ==
Dates	Position
2010–present	Director, Integrated Biosystems Institute, Georgia Institute of Technology
2008–present	Mary and Maisie Gibson Chair in Computational Systems Biology
2008–2010	Associate Director, Integrated Biosystems Institute, Georgia Institute of Technology
2007–2012	Adjunct Professor, School of Chemistry & Biochemistry, Georgia Institute of Technology
2006–present	Director, Center for the Study of Systems Biology, Georgia Institute of Technology
2006–present	GRA Eminent Scholar, Computational Systems Biology
2006–present	Professor, School of Biology, Georgia Institute of Technology
2002–2005	Director, Buffalo Center of Excellence in Bioinformatics
2002–2005	Professor, Structural Biology, University at Buffalo
1999–2002	Director, Computational/Structural Biology, Danforth Plant Science Center

== Patents ==
- System and method for determining three-dimensional structures of proteins, (1993).
- Prediction of relative binding motifs of biologically active peptides and peptide mimetics, (1999).
- Methods for using functional site descriptors and predicting protein function, (2003).
