= Peroxiredoxin =

Family of antioxidant enzymes

AhpC-TSA
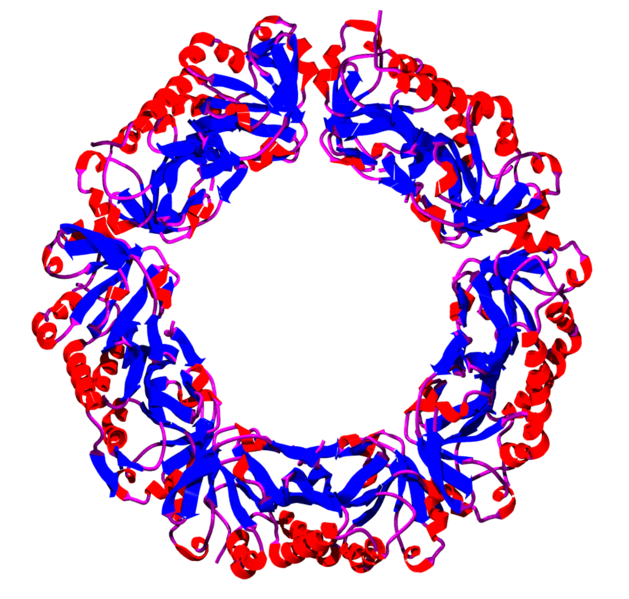
- Structure of AhpC, a bacterial 2-cysteine peroxiredoxin from Salmonella typhimurium.

Identifiers
- Symbol: AhpC-TSA
- Pfam: PF00578
- Pfam clan: CL0172
- InterPro: IPR000866
- SCOP2: 1prx / SCOPe / SUPFAM
- OPM superfamily: 131
- OPM protein: 1xvw
Available protein structures:
- PDB: IPR000866 PF00578 (ECOD; PDBsum)
- AlphaFold: IPR000866; PF00578

peroxiredoxin

Identifiers
- EC no.: 1.11.1.15
- CAS no.: 207137-51-7

Databases
- BRENDA: enzyme data
- ExPASy: NiceZyme view
- KEGG: enzyme entry
- MetaCyc: metabolic pathway
- Rhea: reactions
- PDB structures: RCSB PDB PDBe PDBsum
- Gene Ontology: AmiGO / QuickGO
Search
- PMC: articles
- PubMed: articles
- NCBI: proteins

Peroxiredoxins (Prxs, EC 1.11.1.15; HGNC root symbol PRDX) are a ubiquitous family of antioxidant enzymes that also control cytokine-induced peroxide levels and thereby mediate signal transduction in mammalian cells. The family members in humans are PRDX1, PRDX2, PRDX3, PRDX4, PRDX5, and PRDX6. The physiological importance of peroxiredoxins is indicated by their relative abundance (one of the most abundant proteins in erythrocytes after hemoglobin is peroxiredoxin 2). Their function is the reduction of peroxides, specifically hydrogen peroxide, alkyl hydroperoxides, and peroxynitrite.

== Classification ==
Prxs were historically divided into three (mechanistic) classes: typical 2-Cys Prxs, atypical 2-Cys Prxs, and 1-Cys Prxs. The designation of "1-Cys" and "2-Cys" Prxs was introduced in 1994 as it was noticed that, among the 22 Prx sequences known at the time, only one Cys residue was absolutely conserved; this is the residue now recognized as the (required) peroxidatic cysteine, C_{P}. The second, semi-conserved cysteine noted at the time is the resolving cysteine, C_{R}, which forms an intersubunit disulfide bond with C_{P} in the widespread and abundant Prxs sometimes referred to as the "typical 2-Cys Prxs". Ultimately it was realized that the C_{R} can reside in multiple positions in various Prx family members, leading to the addition of the "atypical 2-Cys Prx" category (Prxs for which a C_{R} is present, but not in the "typical", originally identified position).

Family members are now recognized to fall into six classes or subgroups by sequence/structure similarity, designated as AhpC/Prx1 (essentially synonymous with "typical 2-Cys"; alkyl hydroperoxide reductase C), Prx5, Prx6, PrxQ/BCP (bacterioferritin comigratory protein), Tpx (thiol peroxidase) and AhpE (alkyl hydroperoxide reductase E) groups. It is now recognized that the existence and location of C_{R} across all 6 groups is heterogeneous. Thus, even though the "1-Cys Prx" designation was originally associated with the Prx6 group based on the lack of a C_{R} in human PrxVI, and many Prx6 group members appear not to have a C_{R}, there are "1-Cys" members in all of the subgroups. Moreover, the C_{R} can be located in 5 (known) locations in the structure, yielding either an intersubunit or intrasubunit disulfide bond in the oxidized protein (depending on C_{R} location). To assist with identification of new members and the subgroup to which they belong, a searchable database (the PeroxiRedoxin classification indEX) including Prx sequences identified from GenBank (January 2008 through October 2011) was generated by bioinformatics analysis and is publicly available.

=== Peroxiredoxin-like ===
Mammals also have so-called "peroxiredoxin-like" genes (InterPro: IPR032801). In humans there are three with the symbols PRXL2A, PRXL2B, PRXL2C. These are actually selenium-free orthologs of selenoprotein U, where the selenocysteine found in the version in fishes and birds is replaced with cysteine. The replacement happens to result in a CxxC pattern similar to peroxiredoxin.

== Catalytic cycle ==
The active sites of the peroxiredoxins feature a redox-active cysteine residue (the peroxidatic cysteine), which undergoes oxidization to a sulfenic acid by the peroxide substrate. The recycling of the sulfenic acid back to a thiol is what distinguishes the three enzyme classes. 2-Cys peroxiredoxins are reduced by thiols such as thioredoxins, thioredoxin-like proteins, or possibly glutathione, whereas the 1-Cys enzymes may be reduced by ascorbic acid or glutathione in the presence of GST-π. Using high resolution crystal structures, a detailed catalytic cycle has been derived for Prxs, including a model for the redox-regulated oligomeric state proposed to control enzyme activity. These enzymes are inactivated by over-oxidation (also known as hyperoxidation) of the active thiol to the sulfinic acid (RSO_{2}H). This damage can be reversed by sulfiredoxin.

Peroxiredoxins are frequently referred to as alkyl hydroperoxide reductase (AhpC) in bacteria. Other names include thiol specific antioxidant (TSA) and thioredoxin peroxidase (TPx).

Mammals express six peroxiredoxins:.

- 1-Cys enzymes: PRDX6 (in the Prx6 group)
- 2-Cys enzymes: PRDX1, PRDX2, PRDX3, PRDX4 (all four in the Prx1 group), and PRDX5 (in the Prx5 group)

== Enzyme regulation ==
Peroxiredoxins can be regulated by phosphorylation, redox status such as sulfonation, acetylation, nitration, truncation and oligomerization states.

== Function ==
Peroxiredoxin is reduced by thioredoxin (Trx) after reducing hydrogen peroxide (H_{2}O_{2}) in the following reactions:

- Prx(reduced) + H_{2}O_{2} → Prx(oxidized) + 2H_{2}O
- Prx(oxidized) + Trx(reduced) → Prx(reduced) + Trx(oxidized)

in chemical terms, these reactions can be represented:

- RSH + H_{2}O_{2} → RSOH + 2H_{2}O
- RSOH + R'SH → RSSR'
- RSSR' + 2 R"SH → RSH + R'SH + R"SSR"

The oxidized form of Prx is inactive in its reductase activity, but can function as a molecular chaperone, requiring the donation of electrons from reduced Trx to restore its catalytic activity.

The physiological importance of peroxiredoxins is illustrated by their relative abundance (one of the most abundant proteins in erythrocytes after hemoglobin is peroxiredoxin 2) as well as studies in knockout mice. Mice lacking peroxiredoxin 1 or 2 develop severe haemolytic anemia, and are predisposed to certain haematopoietic cancers. Peroxiredoxin 1 knockout mice have a 15% reduction in lifespan. Peroxiredoxin 6 knockout mice are viable and do not display obvious gross pathology, but are more sensitive to certain exogenous sources of oxidative stress, such as hyperoxia. Peroxiredoxin 3 (mitochondrial matrix peroxiredoxin) knockout mice are viable and do not display obvious gross pathology. Peroxiredoxins are proposed to play a role in cell signaling by regulating H_{2}O_{2} levels.

Plant 2-Cys peroxiredoxins are post-translationally targeted to chloroplasts, where they protect the photosynthetic membrane against photooxidative damage. Nuclear gene expression depends on chloroplast-to-nucleus signalling and responds to photosynthetic signals, such as the acceptor availability at photosystem II and ABA.

== Circadian clock ==
Peroxiredoxins have been implicated in the 24-hour internal circadian clock of many organisms.

== See also ==
- Catalase
- Oxidative stress
- Peroxidase
- Peroxiredoxin classification index
- Reactive oxygen species
- Superoxide dismutase
