= Ribosomopathy =

Ribosomopathies are diseases caused by abnormalities in the structure or function of ribosomal component proteins or rRNA genes, or other genes whose products are involved in ribosome biogenesis.

== Ribosomes ==
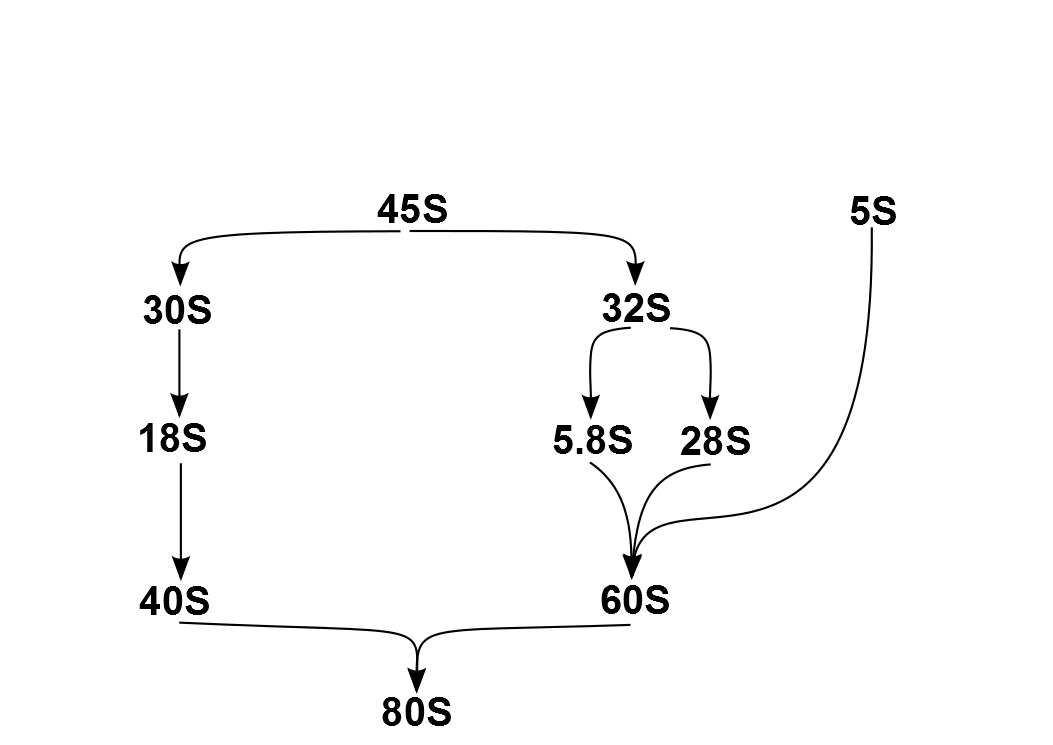
Ribosomal rRNA subunits

Ribosomes are essential for protein synthesis in all living organisms. Prokaryotic and eukaryotic ribosomes both contain a scaffold of ribosomal RNA (rRNA) on which are arrayed an extensive variety of ribosomal proteins (RP). Ribosomopathies can arise from abnormalities of either rRNA or the various RPs.

The nomenclature of rRNA subunits is derived from each component's Svedberg unit, which is an ultracentrifuge sedimentation coefficient, that is affected by mass and also shape. These S units of the rRNA subunits cannot simply be added because they represent measures of sedimentation rate rather than of mass. Eukaryotic ribosomes are somewhat larger and more complex than prokaryotic ribosomes. The overall 80S eukaryotic rRNA structure is composed of a large 60S subunit (LSU) and a small 40S subunit (SSU).

In humans, a single transcription unit separated by 2 internally transcribed spacers encodes a precursor, 45S. The precursor 45S rDNA is organized into 5 clusters (each has 30-40 repeats) on chromosomes 13, 14, 15, 21, and 22. These are transcribed in the nucleolus by RNA polymerase I. 45S is processed in the nucleus via 32S rRNA to 28S and 5.8S, and via 30S to 18S, as shown in the diagram. 18S is a component of the ribosomal 40S subunit. 28S, 5.8S and 5S, which is transcribed independently, are components of 60S. The 5S DNA occurs in tandem arrays (~200-300 true 5S genes and many dispersed pseudogenes); the largest is on chromosome 1q41-42. 5S rRNA is transcribed by RNA polymerase III. It is not fully clear why rRNA is processed in this way rather than being directly transcribed as mature rRNA, but the sequential steps may have a role in the proper folding of rRNA or in subsequent RP assembly.

The products of this processing within the cell nucleus are the four principal types of cytoplasmic rRNA: 28S, 5.8S, 18S, and 5S subunits. and (cite)(cite) (Mammalian cells also have 2 types of mitochondrial rRNA molecules, 12S and 16S.) In humans, as in most eukaryotes, the 18S rRNA is a component of 40S ribosomal subunit, and the 60S large subunit contains three rRNA species (the 5S, 5.8S and 28S in mammals, 25S in plants). 60S rRNA acts as a ribozyme, catalyzing peptide bond formation, while 40S monitors the complementarity between tRNA anticodon and mRNA.

== Diseases ==
Abnormal ribosome biogenesis is linked to several human genetic diseases.

Ribosomopathy has been linked to skeletal muscle atrophy, and underpins most Diamond–Blackfan anemia (DBA), the X-linked subtype of dyskeratosis congenita (DKCX), Treacher Collins syndrome (TCS), Shwachman–Diamond syndrome (SDS) and 5q- myelodysplastic syndrome.(5q- MDS),(cite)(cite) North American Indian childhood cirrhosis (NAIC), isolated congenital asplenia (ICAS), and Bowen–Conradi syndrome (BWCNS), CHARGE syndrome and ANE syndrome (ANES).

The associated chromosome, OMIM genotype, phenotype, and possible disruption points are shown:

Ribosomopathies
name	chromosome	genotype	phenotype	protein	disruption(cite)(cite)
DBA1	19q13.2	603474	105650	RPS19	30S to 18S(cite)
DBA2	8p23-p22	unknown	606129		
DBA3	10q22-q23	602412	610629	RPS24	30S to 18S(cite)
DBA4	15q	180472	612527	RPS17	30S to 18S
DBA5	3q29-qter	180468	612528	RPL35A	32S to 5.8S/28S(cite)
DBA6	1p22.1	603634	612561	RPL5	32S to 5.8S/28S
DBA7	1p36.1-p35	604175	612562	RPL11	32S to 5.8S/28S
DBA8	2p25	603658	612563	RPS7	30S to 18S
DBA9	6p	603632	613308	RPS10	30S to 18S
DBA10	12q	603701	613309	RPS26	30S to 18S
DBA11	17p13	603704	614900	RPS26	30S to 18S
DBA12	3p24	604174	615550	RPL15	45S to 32S
DBA13	14q	603633	615909	RPS29	
DKCX	Xq28	300126	305000	dyskerin	associated with both H/ACA small nucleolar RNA (snoRNA) and with the RNA component of TERC
TCS					
5q-	5q33.1	130620	153550	RPS14	30S to 18S
SDS	7q11.21	607444	260400	SBDS	60S to 80S
CHH	9p13.3	157660	250250	RMRP	mitochondrial RNA processing
NAIC	16q22.1	607456	604901	cirhin	partial loss of interaction between cirhin and NOL11
ICAS	3p22.1	150370	271400	RPSA	
BWCNS	12p13.31	611531	211180	EMG1	18S to 40S
CHARGE	8q12.1-q12.2; also 7q21.11	608892	214800	CHD7; also SEMA3E	
ACES		xxx	xxx	RBM28	

Several ribosomopathies share features such as inherited bone marrow failure, which is characterized a reduced number of blood cells and by a predisposition to cancer. Other features can include skeletal abnormalities and growth retardation. However, clinically these diseases are distinct, and do not show a consistent set of features.

=== Diamond–Blackfan anemia ===
With the exception of rare GATA1 genotypes,(cite) Diamond–Blackfan anemia (DBA) arises from a variety of mutations that cause ribosomopathies.

=== Dyskeratosis congenita ===
The X-linked subtype of dyskeratosis congenita (DKCX)

=== Shwachman–Diamond syndrome ===
Shwachman–Diamond syndrome (SDS) is caused by bi-allelic mutations in the SBDS protein that affects its ability to couple GTP hydrolysis by the GTPase EFL1 to the release of eIF6 from the 60S subunit. Clinically, SDS affects multiple systems, causing bony abnormalities, and pancreatic and neurocognitive dysfunction. SBDS associates with the 60S subunit in human cells and has a role in subunit joining and translational activation in yeast models.

=== 5q- myelodysplastic syndrome ===
5q- myelodysplastic syndrome (MDS) is associated with acquired haplo-insufficiency of RPS14, a component of the eukaryotic small ribosomal subunit (40S). RPS14 is critical for 40S assembly, and depletion of RPS14 in human CD34(+) cells is sufficient to recapitulate the 5q- defect of erythropoiesis with sparing of megakaryocytes.

=== Treacher Collins syndrome ===
Treacher Collins syndrome (TCS)

=== Cartilage–hair hypoplasia ===
Cartilage–hair hypoplasia (CHH) - some sources list confidently as ribosomopathy, others question

=== North American Indian childhood cirrhosis ===
NAIC is an autosomal recessive abnormality of the UTP4 gene, which codes for cirhin. Neonatal jaundice advances over time to biliary cirrhosis with severe liver fibrosis.

=== Bowen–Conradi syndrome ===
Bowen–Conradi syndrome (BCS or BWCNS) is an autosomal recessive abnormality of the EMG1 gene, which plays a role in small ribosomal subunit (SSU) assembly. Most affected children have been from North American Hutterite families, but BWCNS can affect other population groups. Skeletal dysmorphology is seen and severe prenatal and postnatal growth failure usually leads to death by one year of age.

=== Other ===
==== Familial colorectal cancer type X ====
Unlike the mutations of the 5 genes associated with DNA mismatch repair, which are associated with Lynch syndrome with hereditary nonpolyposis colorectal cancer (HNPCC) due to microsatellite instability, familial colorectal cancer (CRC) type X (FCCX) gives rise to HNPCC despite microsatellite stability. FCCX is most likely etiologically heterogeneous but RPS20 may be implicated in some cases.

== p53 ==
The p53 pathway is central to the ribosomopathy phenotype. Ribosomal stress triggers activation of the p53 signaling pathway.

== Cancer ==
Cancer cells have irregularly shaped, large nucleoli, which may correspond ribosomal gene transcription up-regulation, and hence high cell proliferation. Oncogenes, like c-Myc, can upregulate rDNA transcription in a direct and indirect fashion. Tumor suppressors like Rb and p53, on the other hand, can suppress ribosome biogenesis. Additionally, the nucleolus is an important cellular sensor for stress and plays a key role in the activation of p53.

Ribosomopathy has been linked to the pathology of various malignancies. Several ribosomopathies are associated with an increased rate of cancer. For example, both SDS and 5q- syndrome lead to impaired hematopoiesis and a predisposition to leukemia. Additionally, acquired defects in ribosomal proteins that have not been implicated in congenital ribosomopathies have been found in T-lymphoblastic leukemia/lymphoma, stomach cancer and ovarian cancer.
