= S21 =

S21 or S-21 may refer to:

== Automobiles ==
- Chery S21, a city car
- Sisu S-21, a Finnish lorry

== Aviation ==
- De Schelde S.21, a proposed Dutch fighter
- Rans S-21 Outbound, an American homebuilt aircraft
- SIAI S.21, an Italian racing flying boat
- Sikorsky S-21, the first four-engine aircraft in the world
- Short S.21 Maia, a British flying boat mother ship
- Spalinger S.21, a Swiss training glider
- Sukhoi-Gulfstream S-21, a proposed American business jet
- Sunriver Airport in Sunriver, Oregon

== Rail and transit ==
=== Lines ===
- S21 (Berlin), a planned S-Bahn line in Berlin, Germany
- S21 (RER Fribourg), an S-Bahn line in the canton of Freibourg, Switzerland
- S21 (St. Gallen S-Bahn), an S-Bahn service operating over the Appenzell–St. Gallen–Trogen railway line, Switzerland
- S21 (ZVV), a Zurich S-Bahn line in the cantons of Zurich and Zug in Switzerland
- Stuttgart 21, a transportation and urban project in Stuttgart, Germany
- S21, a former line of the Hamburg S-Bahn

=== Stations ===
- Ginzan Station, in Niki, Hokkaidō, Hokkaidō, Japan
- Moto-Yawata Station, in Ichikawa, Chiba, Japan
- Shin-Fukae Station, in Osaka, Japan
- Tokushige Station, in Midori-ku, Nagoya, Aichi, Japan

== Roads ==
- S21 Guangzhou–Huidong Expressway, China
- County Route S21 (California), United States

== Submarines ==
- ARA Santa Fe (S-21), of the Argentine Navy
- Brazilian submarine Tonelero (S21)
- HMS Onyx (S21), of the Royal Navy
- INS Kalvari (S21), of the Indian Navy
- INS Karanj (S21), of the Indian Navy
- USS S-21 (SS-126), of the United States Navy

== Other uses ==
- 40S ribosomal protein S21
- British NVC community S21, a swamps and tall-herb fens community in the British National Vegetation Classification system
- Forward voltage gain or transmission coefficient $S_{21}$ of a two-port network
- S-21: The Khmer Rouge Killing Machine, a 2003 documentary film
- S21: When using do not smoke, a safety phrase
- Samsung Galaxy S21, a series of smartphones
- Security Prison 21, now the Tuol Sleng Genocide Museum in Cambodia
- Serbia 21, a political organization in Serbia
- s21 notice, in England & Wales, from a landlord instructing tenants to leave
