= Protein turnover =

Replacement of broken-down proteins

Example protein half-lives
Name	Half-Life
Collagen	117 years
Eye lens crystallin	>70 years
RFC1	9 hours
RPS8	3 hours
Ornithine decarboxylase	11 minutes

In cell biology, protein turnover refers to the replacement of older proteins as they are broken down within the cell. Different types of proteins have very different turnover rates.

A balance between protein synthesis and protein degradation is required for good health and normal protein metabolism. More synthesis than breakdown indicates an anabolic state that builds lean tissues, more breakdown than synthesis indicates a catabolic state that burns lean tissues. According to D.S. Dunlop, protein turnover occurs in brain cells the same as any other eukaryotic cells, but that "knowledge of those aspects of control and regulation specific or peculiar to brain is an essential element for understanding brain function."

Protein turnover is believed to decrease with age in all senescent organisms including humans. This results in an increase in the amount of damaged protein within the body.

== Protein turnover in the exercise science ==
Four weeks of aerobic exercise has been shown to increase skeletal muscle protein turnover in previously unfit individuals. A diet high in protein increases whole body turnover in endurance athletes.

Some bodybuilding supplements claim to reduce the protein breakdown by reducing or blocking the number of catabolic hormones within the body. This is believed to increase anabolism. However, if protein breakdown falls too low then the body would not be able to remove muscle cells that have been damaged during workouts which would in turn prevent the growth of new muscle cells.
