= S23 =

S23 may refer to:

== Aircraft ==
- Short S.23, a British flying boat
- Sikorsky S-23, a Russian bomber

== Land transport ==
- S23 (Long Island bus), New York, U.S.
- S23 (Cologne S-Bahn), Germany
- S23 (St. Gallen S-Bahn), an S-Bahn service operating over the Gossau–Wasserauen railway line, Switzerland
- S23 (ZVV), a Zurich S-Bahn service, Switzerland
- S23, an Aargau S-Bahn line, Switzerland
- Kita-Tatsumi Station, Osaka, Japan
- Kutchan Station, Hokkaido, Japan

== Law ==
- Patent Reform Act of 2011, a failed bill of the U.S. Congress
- S23: Do not breathe gas/fumes/vapour/spray (appropriate wording to be specified by the manufacturer), in the E.U. Dangerous Substances Directive

== Medicine ==
- S-23 (drug), a selective androgen receptor modulator
- 40S ribosomal protein S23

== Submarines ==
- Chilean submarine Hyatt
- HMS Repulse, of the U.K.'s Royal Navy
- INS Kalvari, of the Indian Navy
- INS Karanj, of the Indian Navy
- USS S-23 (SS-128), of the U. S. Navy

== Other uses ==
- 180 mm gun S-23, a Soviet heavy gun
- British NVC community S23, a designation for swamp and fen habitats
- Samsung Galaxy S23, a 2023 series of smartphones
- Special publication S-23 of the International Hydrographic Organization (IHO) named Limits of Oceans and Seas
