= Receptor for activated C kinase 1 =

Protein-coding gene in the species Homo sapiens

RACK1

Identifiers
- Aliases: RACK1, Gnb2-rs1, H12.3, HLC-7, PIG21, GNB2L1, receptor for activated C kinase 1
- External IDs: OMIM: 176981; MGI: 101849; GeneCards: RACK1
Available structures
PDB	Ortholog search: PDBe RCSB
PDB	List of PDB id codes 4AOW, 4UG0, 4V6X, 5A2Q, 5AJ0, 5FLX

Gene location (Human)
Chr.	Chromosome 5 (human)
Band	5q35.3	Start	181,236,897 bp
Band	5q35.3	End	181,248,096 bp

Gene location (Mouse)
Chr.	Chromosome 11 (mouse)
Band	11|11 B1.2	Start	48,691,159 bp
Band	11|11 B1.2	End	48,697,261 bp
RNA expression pattern
Bgee	Human / Mouse (ortholog); Top expressed in: pericardium; superior surface of tongue; body of tongue; mucosa of pharynx; vena cava; nipple; saphenous vein; trachea; lower lobe of lung; cerebellar vermis / Top expressed in: epiblast; ventricular zone; bone marrow; ovary; ganglionic eminence; spleen; uterus; zone of skin; placenta; morula; More reference expression data
BioGPS	n/a
Gene ontology
Molecular function	protein homodimerization activity; receptor tyrosine kinase binding; SH2 domain binding; signaling adaptor activity; protein tyrosine kinase inhibitor activity; protein binding; enzyme binding; cysteine-type endopeptidase activator activity involved in apoptotic process; molecular adaptor activity; protein phosphatase binding; signaling receptor binding; ion channel inhibitor activity; RNA binding; cadherin binding; ribosome binding; protein kinase C binding; cyclin binding
Cellular component	cytoplasm; cell body; perikaryon; cell projection; membrane; plasma membrane; soma; dendrite; midbody; mitochondrion; perinuclear region of cytoplasm; neuron projection; phagocytic cup; extracellular exosome; nucleus; IRE1-RACK1-PP2A complex; nucleoplasm; cytosol; ribosome; small ribosomal subunit; cytosolic small ribosomal subunit
Biological process	positive regulation of protein homooligomerization; positive regulation of Golgi to plasma membrane protein transport; negative regulation of protein kinase B signaling; positive regulation of protein phosphorylation; positive regulation of ceramide biosynthetic process; regulation of cell division; negative regulation of phagocytosis; positive regulation of gastrulation; rhythmic process; positive regulation of cell migration; negative regulation of endoplasmic reticulum unfolded protein response; cellular response to growth factor stimulus; negative regulation of Wnt signaling pathway; regulation of tumor necrosis factor-mediated signaling pathway; negative regulation of gene expression; regulation of cell cycle; regulation of protein localization; multicellular organism development; positive regulation of GTPase activity; negative regulation of hydrogen peroxide-induced neuron death; positive regulation of mitochondrial depolarization; gastrulation; negative regulation of cell growth; negative regulation of peptidyl-serine phosphorylation; positive regulation of apoptotic process; cell cycle; regulation of growth; viral process; regulation of establishment of cell polarity; activation of cysteine-type endopeptidase activity involved in apoptotic process; positive regulation of intrinsic apoptotic signaling pathway; regulation of translation; positive regulation of proteasomal ubiquitin-dependent protein catabolic process; cellular response to glucose stimulus; positive regulation of cyclic-nucleotide phosphodiesterase activity; apoptotic process; negative regulation of protein tyrosine kinase activity; protein biosynthesis; pigmentation; protein ubiquitination; rescue of stalled ribosome; negative regulation of translation; regulation of protein localization to plasma membrane
Sources:Amigo / QuickGO
Orthologs
Databases	NCBI: entry; OMA: entry
Species	Human	Mouse
Entrez	10399	14694
Ensembl	ENSG00000204628	ENSMUSG00000020372
UniProt	P63244	P68040
RefSeq (mRNA)	NM_006098	NM_008143
RefSeq (protein)	NP_006089	NP_032169
Location (UCSC)	Chr 5: 181.24 – 181.25 Mb	Chr 11: 48.69 – 48.7 Mb
PubMed search
- Wikidata
View/Edit Human	View/Edit Mouse

Receptor for activated C kinase 1 (RACK1), also known as guanine nucleotide-binding protein subunit beta-2-like 1 (GNB2L1), is a 35 kDa protein that in humans is encoded by the RACK1 gene.

== Function ==
RACK1 was originally isolated and identified as an intracellular protein receptor for protein kinase C, noting the significant homology to the beta subunit of heterotrimeric G proteins. Later studies established RACK1, and its yeast homolog Asc1, as a core ribosomal protein of the eukaryotic small (40S) ribosomal subunit. Much of the function of Asc1/RACK1 appears to result from its position on the 'head' of the 40S ribosomal subunit. Asc1/RACK1 participates in several aspects of eukaryotic translation and ribosome quality control, including IRES-mediated translation, non-stop decay, non-functional 18S ribosomal RNA decay, and frameshifting.

== Interactions ==
RACK1 is positioned at the solvent-exposed surface of the 40S ribosomal subunit, where it is held in place through contacts with both the 18S rRNA and other ribosomal proteins, including uS3, uS9, and eS17. Additionally, RACK1 has been shown to interact with:

- AGTRAP
- Androgen receptor,
- CD18,
- CD29
- Cyclin A1
- EIF6,
- FYN,
- IFNAR2,
- Janus kinase 1
- OTUB1,
- P73,
- PDE4D,
- PRKCB1,
- PRKCE,
- PTPRM,
- RAS p21 protein activator 1,
- ST7,
- STAT1,
- Src, and
- Tyrosine kinase 2.

== See also ==
- Eukaryotic small ribosomal subunit (40S)
- Protein kinase C
- Heterotrimeric G protein
