= LAMR =

LAMR may refer to:

- Lamar Advertising Company
- Linux, Apache, MySQL, Ruby, LAMP-like software bundle
- Laminin receptor, also known as ribosomal protein SA
- Los Angeles Metro Rail
