= S11 =

S11 may refer to:

== Aircraft ==
- Fokker S-11, a trainer aircraft
- Rans S-11 Pursuit, an American light aircraft
- SABCA S.11, a Belgian prototype airliner
- Sikorsky S-11, a Russian reconnaissance aircraft
- SPAD S.XI, a French reconnaissance biplane

== Rail and transit ==
=== Lines ===
- S11 (Cologne S-Bahn), Germany
- S11 (ZVV), Zürich, Switzerland
- Line S11 (Chengdu Metro), China
- Line S11 (Milan suburban railway service), Italy
- S11, of the Breisgau S-Bahn, Germany
- S11, of the Hamburg S-Bahn, Germany
- S11, of the Karlsruhe Stadtbahn, Germany

=== Locomotives ===
- ALCO S-11, a diesel-electric switcher
- LSWR S11 class, a steam locomotive
- Sri Lanka Railways S11, a diesel multiple unit

=== Stations ===
- Kitanada Station, in Ōzu, Ehime Prefecture, Japan
- Morishita Station (Tokyo), in Kōtō, Tokyo, Japan
- Myōhōji Station (Hyōgo), in Suma-ku, Kobe, Hyōgo Prefecture, Japan
- Sakurayama Station, in Mizuho-ku, Nagoya, Aichi Prefecture, Japan
- Wutthakat BTS station, in Bangkok, Thailand
- Zenibako Station, in Otaru, Hokkaido, Japan

== Roads ==
- S11 highway (Georgia)
- Expressway S11 (Poland)
- County Route S11 (California), United States

== Submarines ==
- Brazilian submarine Rio Grande do Sul (S11) (Balao class), in service 1963–1972
- Brazilian submarine Rio Grande do Sul (S11) (Tench class), in service 1972–1978
- HMS Orpheus (S11), of the Royal Navy
- USS S-11 (SS-116), of the United States Navy

== Other uses ==
- S11 (classification), a disability swimming classification
- S11 (protest), at the meeting of the World Economic Forum in Melbourne, Australia on September 11, 2000
- 40S ribosomal protein S11
- British NVC community S11, see swamps and tall-herb fens in the British National Vegetation Classification system
- Nissan Silvia (S11), a sports car
- Project S-11, a video game
- September 11 attacks
- $S_{11}$, the first Scattering parameter in an electrical network.
- S11, a postcode district in Sheffield, England
- S-11, a creature in the Sharktopus film
- Voltage reflection coefficient $S_{11}$ of a two-port network
