= RPS5 =

RPS5 may refer to:

- The 40S ribosomal protein S5 and its variants, found in the Eukaryotic ribosome complex
- The plant disease resistance protein RESISTANCE TO PSEUDOMONAS SYRINGAE 5 which guards AvrPphB SUSCEPTIBLE 1/PBS1 in Arabidopsis thaliana - see Arabidopsis thaliana § RPS5
