= Isolated congenital asplenia =

- Other names: ICAS

Isolated congenital asplenia is a rare disease in humans that can cause life-threatening bacterial infections in children due to primary immunodeficiency. The infections can include pneumococal sepsis and meningitis.

ICAS is a ribosomopathy, due to autosomal dominant mutation of the RPSA gene on chromosome 3p21. Unlike heterotaxy syndrome, the absent spleen (asplenia) is not associated with other structural developmental defects. In some cases the spleen is present, but very small and nonfunctional (hyposplenism).

== Immunodeficiency ==
The spleen is an organ within the lymphatic system and its primary function is to filter blood. However, the spleen also plays a key role in immune responses as it detects pathogens within the blood and secretes phagocytes to fight potential infection. Without these immune functions, individuals with isolated congenital asplenia are extremely susceptible to infection. Streptococcus pneumoniae is a common bacteria that affects individuals with ICAS, often causes meningitis, sepsis, and otitis media.
