= Eukaryotic small ribosomal subunit (40S) =

Small ribosomal subunit of eukaryotic 80S ribosomes

The eukaryotic small ribosomal subunit (40S) is the smaller subunit of the eukaryotic ribosome (80S), with the other major component being the large ribosomal subunit (60S). The "40S" and "60S" names originate from the convention that ribosomal particles are denoted according to their sedimentation coefficients in Svedberg units. It is structurally and functionally related to the 30S subunit of 70S prokaryotic ribosomes. However, the 40S subunit is much larger than the prokaryotic 30S subunit and contains many additional protein segments, as well as rRNA expansion segments.

== Function ==
The 40S subunit contains the decoding center which monitors the complementarity of tRNA and mRNA in protein translation. It is the largest component of several translation initiation complexes, including the 43S and 48S preinitiation complexes (PICs), being bound by several eukaryotic initiation factors, including eIF1, eIF1A, and eIF3. The 40S ribosomal subunit is also tightly bound by the HCV IRES to form a binary complex mediate by protein-mRNA and rRNA-mRNA interactions. More information can be found in the articles on the ribosome, the eukaryotic ribosome (80S), and the article on protein translation.

== Overall structure ==
The shape of the small subunit can be subdivided into two large segments, the head and the body. Characteristic features of the body include the left and right feet, the shoulder and the platform. The head features a pointed protrusion reminiscent of a bird's beak. The mRNA binds in the cleft between the head and the body, and there are three binding sites for tRNA, the A-site, P-site and E-site (see article on protein translation for details). The core of the 40S subunit is formed by the 18S ribosomal RNA (abbreviated 18S rRNA), which is homologous to the prokaryotic 16S rRNA. This rRNA core is decorated with dozens of proteins. In the figure "Crystal Structure of the Eukaryotic 40S Ribosomal Subunit from Tetrahymena thermophila", the ribosomal RNA core is represented as a grey tube and expansion segments are shown in red. Proteins which have homologs in eukaryotes, archaea and bacteria are shown as blue ribbons. Proteins shared only between eukaryotes and archaea are shown as orange ribbons and proteins specific to eukaryotes are shown as red ribbons.

Crystal structure of the eukaryotic 40S ribosomal subunit from T. thermophila
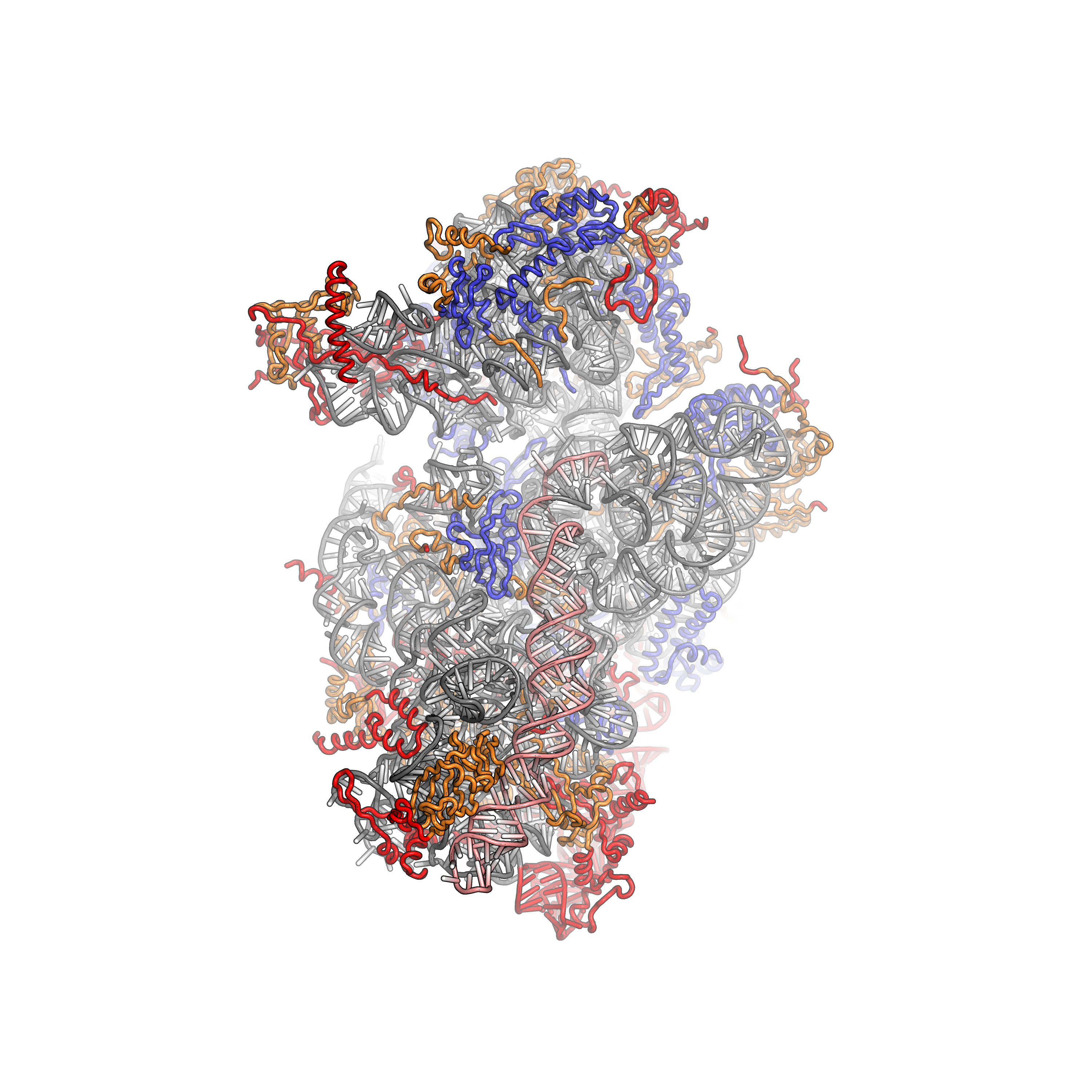
40S subunit viewed from the subunit interface side, PDB identifier 2XZM

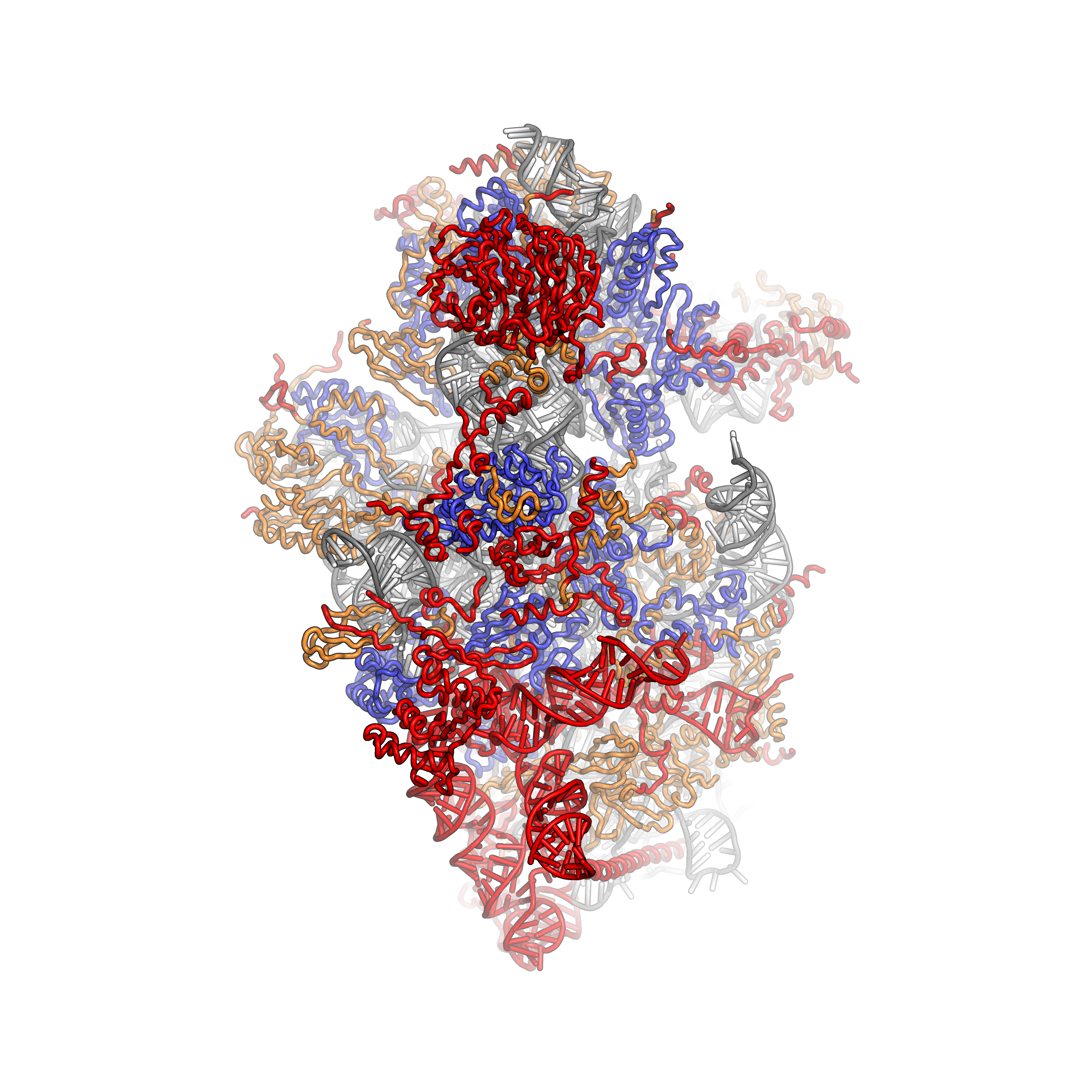
40S subunit viewed from the solvent-exposed side, PDB identifier 2XZM

== 40S ribosomal proteins ==
The table "40S ribosomal proteins" shows the individual protein folds of the 40S subunit colored by conservation. Proteins which have homologs in eukaryotes, archaea and bacteria (EAB) are shown as blue ribbons. Proteins shared only between eukaryotes and archaea (EA) are shown as orange ribbons and proteins specific to eukaryotes (E) are shown as red ribbons. Eukaryote-specific extensions of conserved proteins, ranging from a few residues or loops to very long alpha helices and additional domains, are highlighted in red. For a details, refer to the article on the eukaryotic ribosome. Historically, different nomenclatures have been used for ribosomal proteins. For instance, proteins have been numbered according to their migration properties in gel electrophoresis experiments. Therefore, different names may refer to homologous proteins from different organism, while identical names not necessarily denote homologous proteins. The table "40S ribosomal proteins" crossreferences the human ribosomal protein names with yeast, bacterial and archaeal homologs. Further information can be found in the ribosomal protein gene database (RPG).

40S ribosomal proteins
Structure (Eukaryotic)	H. sapiens	Universal name	Conservation	S. cerevisiae	Bacterial homolog (E. coli)	Archaeal homolog
	RPSA	uS2	EAB	S0	S2p	S2
	RPS2	uS5	EAB	S2	S5p	S5p
	RPS3	uS3	EAB	S3	S3p	S3p
	RPS3A	eS1	EA	S1	n/a	S3Ae
	RPS4 (RPS4X, RPS4Y1, RPS4Y2)	eS4	EA	S4	n/a	S4e
	RPS5	uS7	EAB	S5	S7p	S5p
	RPS6	eS6	EA	S6	n/a	S6e
	RPS7	eS7	E	S7	n/a	n/a
	RPS8	eS8	EA	S8	n/a	S8e
	RPS9	uS4	EAB	S9	S4p	S4p
	RPS10	eS10	E	S10	n/a	n/a
	RPS11	uS17	EAB	S11	S17p	S17p
	RPS12	eS12	E	S12	n/a	n/a
	RPS13	uS15	EAB	S13	S15p	S15p
	RPS14	uS11	EAB	S14	S11p	S11p
	RPS15	uS19	EAB	S15	S19p	S19p
	RPS15A	uS8	EAB	S22	S8p	S8p
	RPS16	uS9	EAB	S16	S9p	S9p
	RPS17	eS17	EA	S17	n/a	S17e
	RPS18	uS13	EAB	S18	S13p	S13p
	RPS19	eS19	EA	S19	n/a	S19e
	RPS20	uS10	EAB	S20	S10p	S10p
	RPS21	eS21	E	S21	n/a	n/a
	RPS23	uS12	EAB	S23	S12p	S12p
	RPS24	eS24	EA	S24	n/a	S24e
	RPS25	eS25	EA	S25	n/a	S25e
	RPS26	eS26	EA	S26	n/a	S26e
	RPS27	eS27	EA	S27	n/a	S27e
	RPS27A	eS31	EA	S31	n/a	S27ae
	RPS28	eS28	EA	S28	n/a	S28e
	RPS29	uS14	EAB	S29	S14p	S14p
	RPS30	eS30	EA	S30	n/a	S30e
	RACK1	RACK1	E	Asc1	n/a	n/a

== See also ==
- Eukaryotic large ribosomal subunit (60S)
