= 40S ribosomal protein S15 =

Protein-coding gene in the species Homo sapiens

RPS15

Identifiers
- Aliases: RPS15, RIG, S15, ribosomal protein S15
- External IDs: OMIM: 180535; MGI: 98117; GeneCards: RPS15
Available structures
PDB	Ortholog search: PDBe RCSB
PDB	List of PDB id codes 4UG0, 4V6X, 5A2Q, 5AJ0, 5FLX, 3J7R, 4D61, 4UJC, 4D5L, 4UJE, 3J7P, 4V5Z, 4UJD

Gene location (Human)
Chr.	Chromosome 19 (human)
Band	19p13.3	Start	1,438,358 bp
Band	19p13.3	End	1,440,495 bp

Gene location (Mouse)
Chr.	Chromosome 10 (mouse)
Band	10|10 C1	Start	80,128,287 bp
Band	10|10 C1	End	80,129,948 bp
RNA expression pattern
Bgee	Human / Mouse (ortholog); Top expressed in: pituitary gland; anterior pituitary; right hemisphere of cerebellum; skin of abdomen; skin of leg; left ovary; right ovary; prostate; right uterine tube; amygdala / Top expressed in: efferent ductule; transitional epithelium of urinary bladder; internal carotid artery; abdominal wall; medial ganglionic eminence; mesenteric lymph nodes; maxillary prominence; migratory enteric neural crest cell; dermis; cervix; More reference expression data
BioGPS	n/a
Gene ontology
Molecular function	DNA binding; structural constituent of ribosome; protein binding; RNA binding
Cellular component	cytosol; ribosome; membrane; focal adhesion; cytosolic small ribosomal subunit; small ribosomal subunit; nucleus; nucleoplasm
Biological process	ribosomal small subunit export from nucleus; viral transcription; SRP-dependent cotranslational protein targeting to membrane; osteoblast differentiation; translational initiation; nuclear-transcribed mRNA catabolic process, nonsense-mediated decay; ribosomal small subunit biogenesis; ribosomal small subunit assembly; protein biosynthesis; rRNA processing
Sources:Amigo / QuickGO
Orthologs
Databases	NCBI: entry; OMA: entry
Species	Human	Mouse
Entrez	6209	20054
Ensembl	ENSG00000115268	ENSMUSG00000063457
UniProt	P62841	P62843
RefSeq (mRNA)	NM_001018; NM_001308226	NM_009091; NM_001310726
RefSeq (protein)	NP_001009; NP_001295155	NP_001297655; NP_033117
Location (UCSC)	Chr 19: 1.44 – 1.44 Mb	Chr 10: 80.13 – 80.13 Mb
PubMed search
- Wikidata
View/Edit Human	View/Edit Mouse

40S ribosomal protein S15 is a protein that in humans is encoded by the RPS15 gene.

Ribosomes, the organelles that catalyze protein synthesis, consist of a small 40S subunit and a large 60S subunit. Together these subunits are composed of 4 RNA species and approximately 80 structurally distinct proteins. This gene encodes a ribosomal protein that is a component of the 40S subunit. The protein belongs to the S19P family of ribosomal proteins. It is located in the cytoplasm. This gene has been found to be activated in various tumors, such as insulinomas, esophageal cancers, and colon cancers. As is typical for genes encoding ribosomal proteins, there are multiple processed pseudogenes of this gene dispersed through the genome.
