= 40S ribosomal protein S12 =

Protein-coding gene in the species Homo sapiens

RPS12

Identifiers
- Aliases: RPS12, S12, ribosomal protein S12
- External IDs: OMIM: 603660; MGI: 98105; GeneCards: RPS12
Available structures
PDB	Ortholog search: PDBe RCSB
PDB	List of PDB id codes 4V6X, 5A2Q, 5AJ0, 4KZY, 4D61, 5FLX, 4KZX, 4D5L, 4UJD, 4KZZ, 4UJE, 4UJC

Gene location (Human)
Chr.	Chromosome 6 (human)
Band	6q23.2	Start	132,814,569 bp
Band	6q23.2	End	132,817,564 bp

Gene location (Mouse)
Chr.	Chromosome 10 (mouse)
Band	10|10 A4	Start	23,661,081 bp
Band	10|10 A4	End	23,663,173 bp
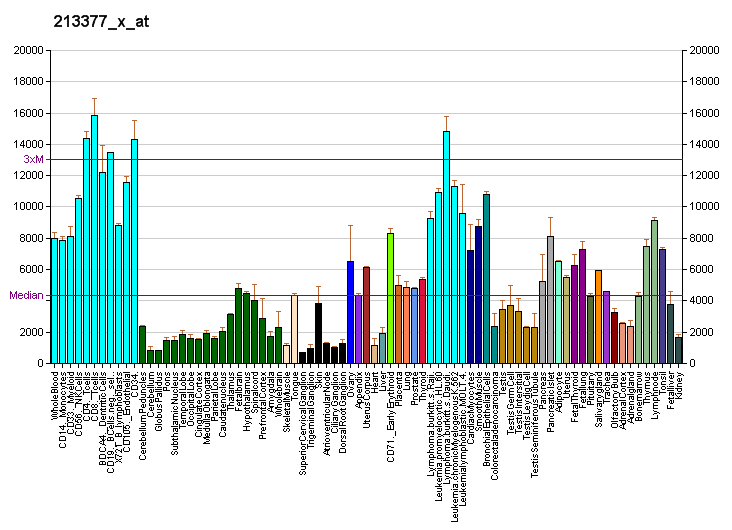
RNA expression pattern
Bgee	Human / Mouse (ortholog); Top expressed in: left ovary; right ovary; gonad; lymph node; skin of abdomen; canal of the cervix; skin of leg; ectocervix; granulocyte; right uterine tube / Top expressed in: medial ganglionic eminence; lip; efferent ductule; ventricular zone; endocardial cushion; embryo; embryo; dermis; atrioventricular valve; epiblast; More reference expression data
BioGPS	More reference expression data
Gene ontology
Molecular function	structural constituent of ribosome; RNA binding
Cellular component	ribosome; cytoplasm; membrane; intracellular anatomical structure; cytosolic small ribosomal subunit; nucleoplasm; cytosol; Golgi apparatus; intracellular membrane-bounded organelle
Biological process	SRP-dependent cotranslational protein targeting to membrane; viral transcription; nuclear-transcribed mRNA catabolic process, nonsense-mediated decay; translational initiation; protein biosynthesis; rRNA processing
Sources:Amigo / QuickGO
Orthologs
Databases	NCBI: entry; OMA: entry
Species	Human	Mouse
Entrez	6206	20042
Ensembl	ENSG00000112306	ENSMUSG00000061983
UniProt	P25398	P63323; Q6ZWZ6
RefSeq (mRNA)	NM_001016	NM_011295
RefSeq (protein)	NP_001007	NP_035425
Location (UCSC)	Chr 6: 132.81 – 132.82 Mb	Chr 10: 23.66 – 23.66 Mb
PubMed search
- Wikidata
View/Edit Human	View/Edit Mouse

40S ribosomal protein S12 is a protein that in humans is encoded by the RPS12 gene.

Ribosomes, the organelles that catalyze protein synthesis, consist of a small 40S subunit and a large 60S subunit. Together these subunits are composed of 4 RNA species and approximately 80 structurally distinct proteins. This gene encodes a ribosomal protein that is a component of the 40S subunit. The protein belongs to the S12E family of ribosomal proteins. It is located in the cytoplasm. Increased expression of this gene in colorectal cancers compared to matched normal colonic mucosa has been observed. As is typical for genes encoding ribosomal proteins, there are multiple processed pseudogenes of this gene dispersed through the genome.
