= 40S ribosomal protein S5 =

Protein found in humans

RPS5

Identifiers
- Aliases: RPS5, S5, ribosomal protein S5
- External IDs: OMIM: 603630; MGI: 1097682; GeneCards: RPS5
Available structures
PDB	Ortholog search: PDBe RCSB
PDB	List of PDB id codes 4UG0, 4V6X, 5A2Q, 5AJ0, 3J7P, 4KZX, 4UJE, 4KZY, 4D5L, 4KZZ, 3J7R, 4UJD, 4V5Z, 5FLX, 4D61, 4UJC,%%s4KZY, 3J7R, 4D61, 4KZX, 4D5L, 4V5Z, 5A2Q, 4V6X, 4UJD, 3J7P, 5AJ0, 4KZZ, 4UG0, 4UJE, 4UJC, 5FLX

Gene location (Human)
Chr.	Chromosome 19 (human)
Band	19q13.43	Start	58,386,400 bp
Band	19q13.43	End	58,394,806 bp

Gene location (Mouse)
Chr.	Chromosome 7 (mouse)
Band	7|7 A1	Start	12,656,217 bp
Band	7|7 A1	End	12,660,613 bp
RNA expression pattern
Bgee	Human / Mouse (ortholog); Top expressed in: gonad; vulva; trabecular bone; mucosa of sigmoid colon; skin of arm; human penis; left ovary; oral cavity; superficial temporal artery; skin of thigh / Top expressed in: Gonadal ridge; mandibular prominence; maxillary prominence; efferent ductule; internal carotid artery; somite; medial ganglionic eminence; precursor cell; migratory enteric neural crest cell; external carotid artery; More reference expression data
BioGPS	n/a
Gene ontology
Molecular function	structural constituent of ribosome; protein binding; mRNA binding; RNA binding; rRNA binding
Cellular component	cytosol; ribosome; membrane; focal adhesion; small ribosomal subunit; extracellular exosome; extracellular matrix; nucleoplasm; cytosolic small ribosomal subunit; ribonucleoprotein complex
Biological process	viral transcription; SRP-dependent cotranslational protein targeting to membrane; translational initiation; regulation of translational fidelity; nuclear-transcribed mRNA catabolic process, nonsense-mediated decay; rRNA processing; protein biosynthesis; ribosomal small subunit assembly
Sources:Amigo / QuickGO
Orthologs
Databases	NCBI: entry; OMA: entry
Species	Human	Mouse
Entrez	6193	20103
Ensembl	ENSG00000083845	ENSMUSG00000012848
UniProt	P46782	P97461
RefSeq (mRNA)	NM_001009	NM_009095
RefSeq (protein)	NP_001000; NP_001000.2	NP_033121
Location (UCSC)	Chr 19: 58.39 – 58.39 Mb	Chr 7: 12.66 – 12.66 Mb
PubMed search
- Wikidata
View/Edit Human	View/Edit Mouse

40S ribosomal protein S5 is a ribosomal subunit of the Eukaryotic ribosome (80S) complex. In humans it is encoded by the RPS5 gene.

Ribosomes, the organelles that catalyze protein synthesis, in eukaryotes, consist of a small 40S subunit and a large 60S subunit (whereas prokaryotic ribosomes are 70 Svedberg units, composed of 50S and 30S subunits). They are located in the cytoplasm. Together these subunits are composed of four RNA species and approximately 80 structurally distinct proteins. This gene encodes a ribosomal protein that is a component of the eukaryotic 40S subunit. The protein belongs to the S7P family of ribosomal proteins. Variable expression of this gene in colorectal cancers compared to adjacent normal tissues has been observed, although no correlation between the level of expression and the severity of the disease has been found. As is typical for genes encoding ribosomal proteins, there are multiple processed pseudogenes of this gene dispersed through the genome.
