= 40S ribosomal protein S9 =

Protein-coding gene in the species Homo sapiens

RPS9

Identifiers
- Aliases: RPS9, S9, ribosomal protein S9
- External IDs: OMIM: 603631; MGI: 1924096; GeneCards: RPS9
Available structures
PDB	Ortholog search: PDBe RCSB
PDB	List of PDB id codes 4UG0, 4V6X, 5A2Q, 5AJ0, 4KZY, 3J7R, 4D61, 4KZX, 4D5L, 5FLX, 4UJD, 3J7P, 4KZZ, 4UJE, 4UJC

Gene location (Human)
Chr.	Chromosome 19 (human)
Band	19q13.42	Start	54,200,809 bp
Band	19q13.42	End	54,249,003 bp

Gene location (Mouse)
Chr.	Chromosome 7 (mouse)
Band	7|7 A1	Start	3,706,992 bp
Band	7|7 A1	End	3,709,896 bp
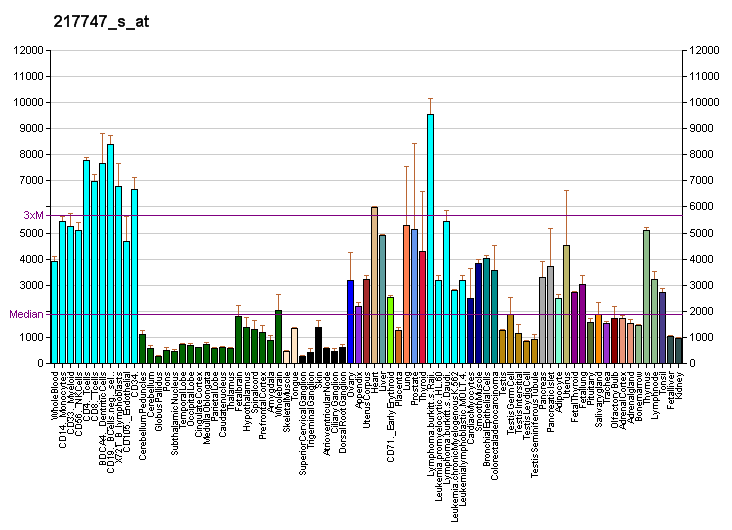

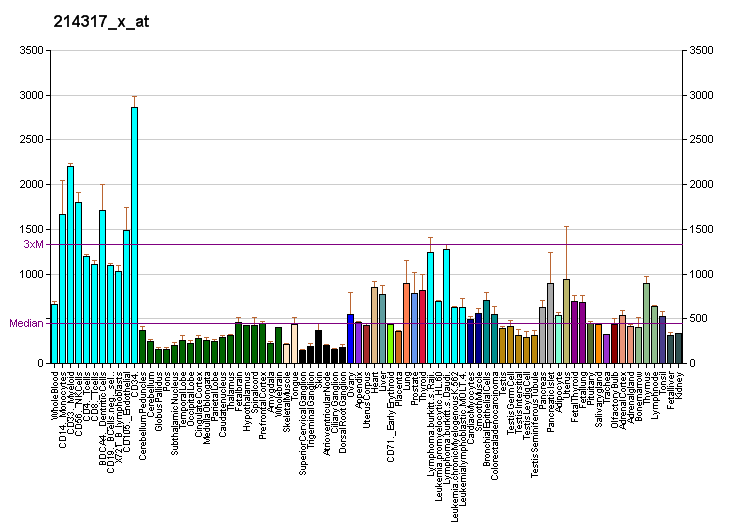
RNA expression pattern
Bgee	Human / Mouse (ortholog); Top expressed in: monocyte; left ovary; right ovary; right uterine tube; skin of abdomen; canal of the cervix; skin of leg; lymph node; appendix; gallbladder / Top expressed in: medial ganglionic eminence; ventricular zone; transitional epithelium of urinary bladder; efferent ductule; blastocyst; fetal liver hematopoietic progenitor cell; thymus; maxillary prominence; lip; mandibular prominence; More reference expression data
BioGPS	More reference expression data
Gene ontology
Molecular function	rRNA binding; structural constituent of ribosome; translation regulator activity; protein binding; RNA binding
Cellular component	cytoplasm; cytosol; ribosome; membrane; focal adhesion; intracellular anatomical structure; nucleolus; small ribosomal subunit; extracellular exosome; nucleus; nucleoplasm; cytosolic small ribosomal subunit; synapse; ribonucleoprotein complex
Biological process	positive regulation of translational fidelity; viral transcription; SRP-dependent cotranslational protein targeting to membrane; positive regulation of cell population proliferation; translational initiation; nuclear-transcribed mRNA catabolic process, nonsense-mediated decay; protein biosynthesis; rRNA processing
Sources:Amigo / QuickGO
Orthologs
Databases	NCBI: entry; OMA: entry
Species	Human	Mouse
Entrez	6203	76846
Ensembl	ENSG00000274646; ENSG00000277359; ENSG00000274950; ENSG00000274626; ENSG00000275323 ENSG00000278270; ENSG00000278081; ENSG00000274005; ENSG00000277079; ENSG00000170889	ENSMUSG00000006333
UniProt	P46781	Q6ZWN5
RefSeq (mRNA)	NM_001013; NM_001321701; NM_001321702; NM_001321704; NM_001321705 NM_001321706	NM_029767
RefSeq (protein)	NP_001004; NP_001308630; NP_001308631; NP_001308633; NP_001308634 NP_001308635	NP_084043
Location (UCSC)	Chr 19: 54.2 – 54.25 Mb	Chr 7: 3.71 – 3.71 Mb
PubMed search
- Wikidata
View/Edit Human	View/Edit Mouse

40S ribosomal protein S9 is a protein that in humans is encoded by the RPS9 gene.

Ribosomes, the organelles that catalyze protein synthesis, consist of a small 40S subunit and a large 60S subunit. Together these subunits are composed of 4 RNA species and approximately 80 structurally distinct proteins. This gene encodes a ribosomal protein that is a component of the 40S subunit. The protein belongs to the S4P family of ribosomal proteins. It is located in the cytoplasm. Variable expression of this gene in colorectal cancers compared to adjacent normal tissues has been observed, although no correlation between the level of expression and the severity of the disease has been found. As is typical for genes encoding ribosomal proteins, multiple processed pseudogenes derived from this gene are dispersed through the genome.
