= 40S ribosomal protein S27 =

Protein found in humans

RPS27

Identifiers
- Aliases: RPS27, MPS-1, MPS1, S27, ribosomal protein S27, DBA17
- External IDs: OMIM: 603702; MGI: 1915191; GeneCards: RPS27
Available structures
| PDB | Ortholog search: PDBe RCSB |
| PDB | List of PDB id codes 4UG0, 4V6X, 5A2Q, 5AJ0, 4KZY, 3J7R, 4D61, 4KZX, 4D5L, 5FLX, 4UJD, 3J7P, 4KZZ, 4UJE, 4UJC |

Gene location (Human)
| Chr. | Chromosome 1 (human) |
| Band | 1q21.3 | Start | 153,990,762 bp |
| Band | 1q21.3 | End | 153,992,155 bp |

Gene location (Mouse)
| Chr. | Chromosome 9 (mouse) |
| Band | 9|9 C | Start | 66,853,368 bp |
| Band | 9|9 C | End | 66,856,798 bp |
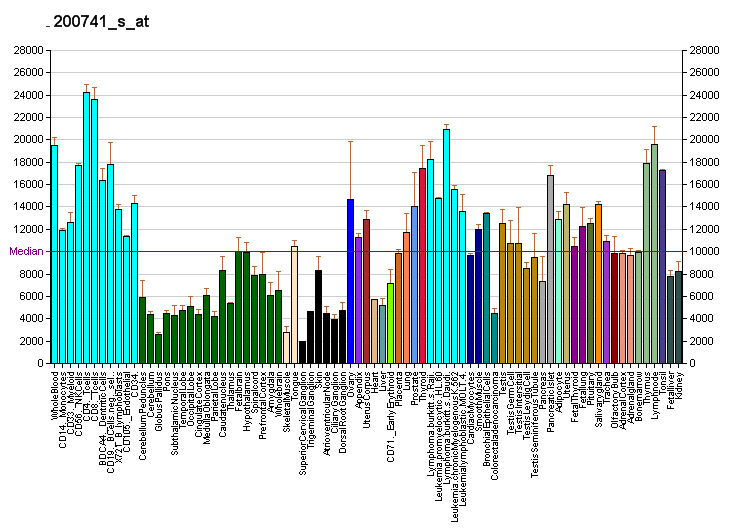
RNA expression pattern
| Bgee | Human / Mouse (ortholog); Top expressed in: ganglionic eminence; granulocyte; left ovary; right ovary; canal of the cervix; lymph node; Achilles tendon; ventricular zone; fallopian tube; corpus callosum / Top expressed in: embryo; endocardial cushion; embryo; parotid gland; right kidney; seminal vesicula; lacrimal gland; epiblast; yolk sac; zygote; More reference expression data |
| BioGPS | More reference expression data |
Gene ontology
| Molecular function | DNA binding; structural constituent of ribosome; zinc ion binding; metal ion binding; protein binding; RNA binding |
| Cellular component | cytosol; ribosome; intracellular anatomical structure; nucleus; nucleoplasm; cytosolic small ribosomal subunit; postsynaptic density; presynapse; glutamatergic synapse; GABA-ergic synapse |
| Biological process | viral transcription; SRP-dependent cotranslational protein targeting to membrane; translational initiation; ribosomal small subunit assembly; nuclear-transcribed mRNA catabolic process, nonsense-mediated decay; cell population proliferation; protein biosynthesis; sister chromatid cohesion; rRNA processing |
Sources:Amigo / QuickGO
Orthologs
| Databases | NCBI: entry; OMA: entry |
| Species | Human | Mouse |
| Entrez | 6232 | 67941 |
| Ensembl | ENSG00000177954 | ENSMUSG00000036781 |
| UniProt | P42677 | Q6ZWY3 |
| RefSeq (mRNA) | NM_001030; NM_001349946; NM_001349947 | NM_026467; NM_001311101; NM_001361106 |
| RefSeq (protein) | NP_001021; NP_001336875; NP_001336876 | NP_001298030; NP_080743; NP_001348035 |
| Location (UCSC) | Chr 1: 153.99 – 153.99 Mb | Chr 9: 66.85 – 66.86 Mb |
| PubMed search |
- Wikidata
| View/Edit Human | View/Edit Mouse |

40S ribosomal protein S27, also known as metallopan-stimulin 1 or MPS-1, is a protein that in humans is encoded by the RPS27 gene. Metallopanstimulin is a zinc finger protein proposed to be involved DNA repair as well as oncogenesis.

== Function ==
Ribosomes, the organelles that catalyze protein synthesis, consist of a small 40S subunit and a large 60S subunit. Together these subunits are composed of 4 RNA species and approximately 80 structurally distinct proteins. This gene encodes a ribosomal protein that is a component of the 40S subunit. The protein belongs to the S27E family of ribosomal proteins. It contains a C4-type zinc finger domain that can bind to zinc. The encoded protein has been shown to be able to bind to nucleic acid. It is located in the cytoplasm as a ribosomal component, but it has also been detected in the nucleus. Studies in rat indicate that ribosomal protein S27 is located near ribosomal protein S18 in the 40S subunit and is covalently linked to translation initiation factor eIF3. As is typical for genes encoding ribosomal proteins, there are multiple processed pseudogenes of this gene dispersed through the genome.

== Clinical significance ==
Its expression is increased in several types of malignancy and MPS levels have been reported to drop with treatment of some cancers. It has also been used as a target for some chemotherapies, which aim to chelate out the zinc from the zinc finger motif of the MPS, thus yielding it inactive. These therapies have shown promise for the treatment of cancer in laboratory experiments and some limited clinical trials. Head and neck cancer transfected to overexpress this protein have demonstrated suppressed growth.
