= AGTRAP =

Protein-coding gene in humans

Identifiers
- Aliases: AGTRAP, ATRAP, angiotensin II receptor associated protein
- External IDs: OMIM: 608729; MGI: 1339977; GeneCards: AGTRAP
Available structures
PDB	Ortholog search: PDBe RCSB
PDB	List of PDB id codes 1ZV0, 4YAY

Gene location (Human)
Chr.	Chromosome 1 (human)
Band	1p36.22	Start	11,736,084 bp
Band	1p36.22	End	11,754,802 bp

Gene location (Mouse)
Chr.	Chromosome 4 (mouse)
Band	4 E1|4 78.67 cM	Start	148,161,518 bp
Band	4 E1|4 78.67 cM	End	148,172,488 bp
RNA expression pattern
Bgee	Human / Mouse (ortholog); Top expressed in: granulocyte; monocyte; right uterine tube; pancreatic ductal cell; blood; gastric mucosa; spleen; right lung; upper lobe of left lung; bone marrow / Top expressed in: blastocyst; right kidney; granulocyte; choroid plexus of fourth ventricle; proximal tubule; gastrula; Ileal epithelium; yolk sac; human kidney; embryo; More reference expression data
BioGPS	n/a
Gene ontology
Molecular function	protein binding; angiotensin type II receptor activity
Cellular component	integral component of membrane; Golgi membrane; plasma membrane; Golgi apparatus; cell cortex; endoplasmic reticulum membrane; cytoplasmic vesicle membrane; intracellular membrane-bounded organelle; endoplasmic reticulum; membrane; cytoplasmic vesicle; nucleoplasm; cytosol
Biological process	regulation of blood pressure; angiotensin-activated signaling pathway; response to hypoxia
Sources:Amigo / QuickGO
Orthologs
Databases	NCBI: entry; OMA: entry
Species	Human	Mouse
Entrez	57085	11610
Ensembl	ENSG00000177674	ENSMUSG00000029007
UniProt	Q6RW13	Q9WVK0
RefSeq (mRNA)	NM_001040194; NM_001040195; NM_001040196; NM_001040197; NM_020350	NM_001301281; NM_009642
RefSeq (protein)	NP_001035284; NP_001035285; NP_001035286; NP_001035287; NP_065083	NP_001288210; NP_033772
Location (UCSC)	Chr 1: 11.74 – 11.75 Mb	Chr 4: 148.16 – 148.17 Mb
PubMed search
- Wikidata
View/Edit Human	View/Edit Mouse

Type-1 angiotensin II receptor-associated protein is a protein that in humans is encoded by the AGTRAP gene.

This gene encodes a transmembrane protein localized to the plasma membrane and perinuclear vesicular structures. The gene product interacts with the angiotensin II type I receptor and negatively regulates angiotensin II signaling. Alternative splicing of this gene generates multiple transcript variants encoding different isoforms.

== Interactions ==
AGTRAP has been shown to interact with GNB2L1.
