= 40S ribosomal protein S21 =

Protein-coding gene in the species Homo sapiens

RPS21

Identifiers
- Aliases: RPS21, HLDF, S21, ribosomal protein S21
- External IDs: OMIM: 180477; MGI: 1913731; GeneCards: RPS21
Available structures
PDB	Ortholog search: PDBe RCSB
PDB	List of PDB id codes 4UG0, 4V6X, 5A2Q, 5AJ0, 5FLX, 3J7R, 4D61, 4D5L, 4UJD, 3J7P, 4UJE, 4UJC

Gene location (Human)
Chr.	Chromosome 20 (human)
Band	20q13.33	Start	62,387,103 bp
Band	20q13.33	End	62,388,520 bp

Gene location (Mouse)
Chr.	Chromosome 2 (mouse)
Band	n/a	Start	180,257,377 bp
Band	n/a	End	180,258,445 bp
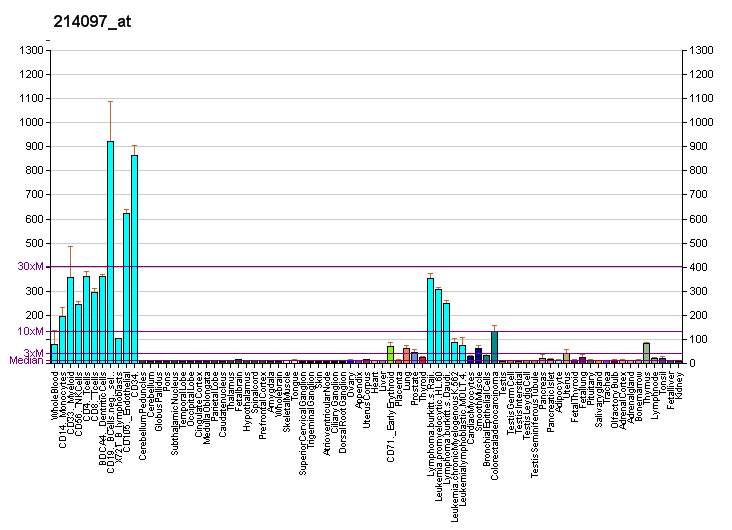

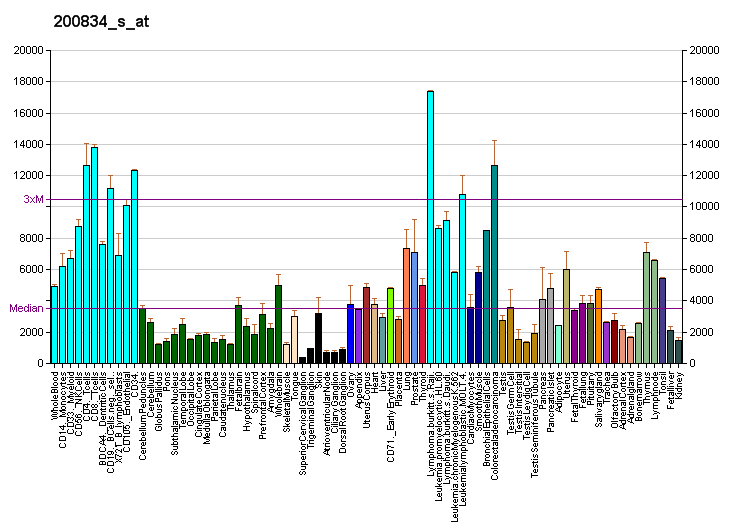
RNA expression pattern
Bgee	Human / Mouse (ortholog); Top expressed in: nipple; human penis; trabecular bone; middle frontal gyrus; superficial temporal artery; caput epididymis; paraflocculus of cerebellum; thymus; vulva; oral cavity / Top expressed in: hand; endocardial cushion; medial ganglionic eminence; vas deferens; atrioventricular valve; migratory enteric neural crest cell; transitional epithelium of urinary bladder; efferent ductule; condyle; cervix; More reference expression data
BioGPS	More reference expression data
Gene ontology
Molecular function	protein N-terminus binding; structural constituent of ribosome; RNA binding
Cellular component	small ribosomal subunit; intracellular anatomical structure; cytosol; cytosolic small ribosomal subunit; ribosome; nucleoplasm; cytoplasm; endoplasmic reticulum; rough endoplasmic reticulum; polysomal ribosome; synapse
Biological process	endonucleolytic cleavage in ITS1 to separate SSU-rRNA from 5.8S rRNA and LSU-rRNA from tricistronic rRNA transcript (SSU-rRNA, 5.8S rRNA, LSU-rRNA); endonucleolytic cleavage to generate mature 3'-end of SSU-rRNA from (SSU-rRNA, 5.8S rRNA, LSU-rRNA); translational initiation; SRP-dependent cotranslational protein targeting to membrane; nuclear-transcribed mRNA catabolic process, nonsense-mediated decay; viral transcription; protein biosynthesis; rRNA processing; cytoplasmic translation
Sources:Amigo / QuickGO
Orthologs
Databases	NCBI: entry; OMA: entry
Species	Human	Mouse
Entrez	6227	66481
Ensembl	ENSG00000171858	ENSMUSG00000039001
UniProt	P63220	Q9CQR2
RefSeq (mRNA)	NM_001024	NM_025587
RefSeq (protein)	NP_001015	NP_079863; NP_001342445; NP_001342446; NP_001342447; NP_001342449 NP_001342450
Location (UCSC)	Chr 20: 62.39 – 62.39 Mb	Chr 2: 180.26 – 180.26 Mb
PubMed search
- Wikidata
View/Edit Human	View/Edit Mouse

40S ribosomal protein S21 is a protein, encoded in humans by the RPS21 gene.

== Function ==
Ribosomes, the organelles that catalyze protein synthesis, consist of a small 40S subunit and a large 60S subunit. Together these subunits are composed of 4 RNA species and approximately 80 structurally distinct proteins. This gene encodes a ribosomal protein that is a component of the 40S subunit. The protein belongs to the S21E family of ribosomal proteins.

It is located in the cytoplasm. Alternative splice variants that encode different protein isoforms have been described, but their existence has not been verified. As is typical for genes encoding ribosomal proteins, there are multiple processed pseudogenes of this gene dispersed through the genome.

== Interactions ==
RPS21 has been shown to interact with Ribosomal protein SA.
