= 40S ribosomal protein S18 =

Protein-coding gene in the species Homo sapiens

RPS18

Identifiers
- Aliases: RPS18, D6S218E, HKE3, KE-3, KE3, S18, ribosomal protein S18
- External IDs: OMIM: 180473; MGI: 98146; GeneCards: RPS18
Available structures
PDB	Ortholog search: PDBe RCSB
PDB	List of PDB id codes 4UG0, 4V6X, 5A2Q, 5AJ0, 4KZY, 3J7R, 4D61, 4KZX, 4D5L, 4V5Z, 5FLX, 4UJD, 3J7P, 4KZZ, 4UJE, 4UJC

Gene location (Human)
Chr.	Chromosome 6 (human)
Band	6p21.32	Start	33,272,075 bp
Band	6p21.32	End	33,276,511 bp

Gene location (Mouse)
Chr.	Chromosome 17 (mouse)
Band	17 B1|17 17.98 cM	Start	34,170,973 bp
Band	17 B1|17 17.98 cM	End	34,174,975 bp
RNA expression pattern
Bgee	Human / Mouse (ortholog); Top expressed in: left ovary; right ovary; skin of leg; skin of abdomen; canal of the cervix; lymph node; ectocervix; fallopian tube; lactiferous gland; vagina / Top expressed in: ventricular zone; lip; blastocyst; yolk sac; morula; neural layer of retina; right kidney; tail of embryo; genital tubercle; granulocyte; More reference expression data
BioGPS	n/a
Gene ontology
Molecular function	rRNA binding; protein binding; nucleic acid binding; RNA binding; structural constituent of ribosome; protein kinase binding
Cellular component	cytoplasm; ribosome; membrane; focal adhesion; intracellular anatomical structure; small ribosomal subunit; extracellular exosome; nucleus; nucleoplasm; extracellular matrix; cytosol; cytosolic small ribosomal subunit; postsynaptic density; synapse
Biological process	viral transcription; SRP-dependent cotranslational protein targeting to membrane; translational initiation; nuclear-transcribed mRNA catabolic process, nonsense-mediated decay; protein biosynthesis; ribosome biogenesis; rRNA processing
Sources:Amigo / QuickGO
Orthologs
Databases	NCBI: entry; OMA: entry
Species	Human	Mouse
Entrez	6222	20084
Ensembl	ENSG00000226225; ENSG00000096150; ENSG00000231500; ENSG00000235650; ENSG00000223367 ENSG00000227794	ENSMUSG00000008668
UniProt	P62269	P62270
RefSeq (mRNA)	NM_022551	NM_011296; NM_138946
RefSeq (protein)	NP_072045	NP_035426
Location (UCSC)	Chr 6: 33.27 – 33.28 Mb	Chr 17: 34.17 – 34.17 Mb
PubMed search
- Wikidata
View/Edit Human	View/Edit Mouse

40S ribosomal protein S18 is a protein that in humans is encoded by the RPS18 gene.

Ribosomes, the organelles that catalyze protein synthesis, consist of a small 40S subunit and a large 60S subunit. Together these subunits are composed of 4 RNA species and approximately 80 structurally distinct proteins. This gene encodes a ribosomal protein that is a component of the 40S subunit. The protein belongs to the S13P family of ribosomal proteins. It is located in the cytoplasm. The gene product of the E. coli ortholog (ribosomal protein S13) is involved in the binding of fMet-tRNA, and thus, in the initiation of translation. This gene is an ortholog of mouse Ke3. As is typical for genes encoding ribosomal proteins, there are multiple processed pseudogenes of this gene dispersed through the genome.
