= 40S ribosomal protein S24 =

Protein-coding gene in the species Homo sapiens

RPS24

Identifiers
- Aliases: RPS24, DBA3, S24, ribosomal protein S24, eS24
- External IDs: OMIM: 602412; MGI: 98147; GeneCards: RPS24
Available structures
PDB	Ortholog search: PDBe RCSB
PDB	List of PDB id codes 4UG0, 4V6X, 5A2Q, 5AJ0, 5FLX, 4D61, 4D5L, 4UJD, 4UJE, 4UJC

Gene location (Human)
Chr.	Chromosome 10 (human)
Band	10q22.3	Start	78,033,760 bp
Band	10q22.3	End	78,056,813 bp

Gene location (Mouse)
Chr.	Chromosome 14 (mouse)
Band	14|14 A3	Start	24,537,193 bp
Band	14|14 A3	End	24,547,027 bp
RNA expression pattern
Bgee	Human / Mouse (ortholog); Top expressed in: mucosa of sigmoid colon; ganglionic eminence; cartilage tissue; caput epididymis; lactiferous duct; mucosa of paranasal sinus; urethra; tail of epididymis; ventricular zone; corpus epididymis / Top expressed in: ventricular zone; embryo; embryo; genital tubercle; yolk sac; lip; tail of embryo; dentate gyrus of hippocampal formation granule cell; superior frontal gyrus; primary visual cortex; More reference expression data
BioGPS	n/a
Gene ontology
Molecular function	structural constituent of ribosome; translation initiation factor binding; RNA binding
Cellular component	cytosol; ribosome; membrane; intracellular anatomical structure; small ribosomal subunit; nucleus; nucleoplasm; cytosolic small ribosomal subunit
Biological process	maturation of SSU-rRNA from tricistronic rRNA transcript (SSU-rRNA, 5.8S rRNA, LSU-rRNA); viral transcription; SRP-dependent cotranslational protein targeting to membrane; erythrocyte homeostasis; translational initiation; nuclear-transcribed mRNA catabolic process, nonsense-mediated decay; ribosomal small subunit biogenesis; protein biosynthesis; rRNA processing
Sources:Amigo / QuickGO
Orthologs
Databases	NCBI: entry; OMA: entry
Species	Human	Mouse
Entrez	6229	20088
Ensembl	ENSG00000138326	ENSMUSG00000025290
UniProt	P62847	P62849
RefSeq (mRNA)	NM_001026; NM_001142282; NM_001142283; NM_001142284; NM_001142285 NM_033022	NM_011297; NM_207634; NM_207635; NM_001360584; NM_001360585 NM_001360586
RefSeq (protein)	NP_001017; NP_001135754; NP_001135755; NP_001135756; NP_001135757 NP_148982	NP_035427; NP_997517; NP_997518; NP_001347513; NP_001347514 NP_001347515
Location (UCSC)	Chr 10: 78.03 – 78.06 Mb	Chr 14: 24.54 – 24.55 Mb
PubMed search
- Wikidata
View/Edit Human	View/Edit Mouse

40S ribosomal protein S24 is a protein that in humans is encoded by the RPS24 gene.

Ribosomes, the organelles that catalyze protein synthesis, consist of a small 40S subunit and a large 60S subunit. Together these subunits are composed of 4 RNA species and approximately 80 structurally distinct proteins. This gene encodes a ribosomal protein that is a component of the 40S subunit. The protein belongs to the S24E family of ribosomal proteins. It is located in the cytoplasm. Alternative splice variants that encode different protein isoforms exist. As is typical for genes encoding ribosomal proteins, there are multiple processed pseudogenes of this gene dispersed through the genome.
