= 40S ribosomal protein S8 =

Protein found in humans

RPS8

Identifiers
- Aliases: RPS8, S8, ribosomal protein S8
- External IDs: OMIM: 600357; MGI: 98166; GeneCards: RPS8
Available structures
PDB	Ortholog search: PDBe RCSB
PDB	List of PDB id codes 4UG0, 4V6X, 5A2Q, 5AJ0, 3J7P, 4UJE, 4D5L, 3J7R, 4UJD, 5FLX, 4D61, 4UJC

Gene location (Human)
Chr.	Chromosome 1 (human)
Band	1p34.1	Start	44,775,251 bp
Band	1p34.1	End	44,778,779 bp

Gene location (Mouse)
Chr.	Chromosome 4 (mouse)
Band	4|4 D1	Start	117,011,024 bp
Band	4|4 D1	End	117,013,440 bp
RNA expression pattern
Bgee	Human / Mouse (ortholog); Top expressed in: left ovary; right ovary; canal of the cervix; body of uterus; fallopian tube; left adrenal cortex; ganglionic eminence; right uterine tube; right adrenal gland; lymph node / Top expressed in: ventricular zone; epiblast; ganglionic eminence; uterus; esophagus; ovary; embryo; ileum; duodenum; lens; More reference expression data
BioGPS	n/a
Gene ontology
Molecular function	structural constituent of ribosome; RNA binding
Cellular component	focal adhesion; nucleus; intracellular anatomical structure; ribosome; extracellular exosome; membrane; nucleoplasm; cytoplasm; endoplasmic reticulum; cytosol; cytosolic small ribosomal subunit; ribonucleoprotein complex
Biological process	nuclear-transcribed mRNA catabolic process, nonsense-mediated decay; SRP-dependent cotranslational protein targeting to membrane; viral transcription; maturation of SSU-rRNA from tricistronic rRNA transcript (SSU-rRNA, 5.8S rRNA, LSU-rRNA); translational initiation; protein biosynthesis; rRNA processing
Sources:Amigo / QuickGO
Orthologs
Databases	NCBI: entry; OMA: entry
Species	Human	Mouse
Entrez	6202	20116
Ensembl	ENSG00000142937	ENSMUSG00000047675
UniProt	P62241	P62242
RefSeq (mRNA)	NM_001012	NM_009098
RefSeq (protein)	NP_001003	NP_033124
Location (UCSC)	Chr 1: 44.78 – 44.78 Mb	Chr 4: 117.01 – 117.01 Mb
PubMed search
- Wikidata
View/Edit Human	View/Edit Mouse

40S ribosomal protein S8 is a protein that in humans is encoded by the RPS8 gene.

Ribosomes, the organelles that catalyze protein synthesis, consist of a small 40S subunit and a large 60S subunit. Together these subunits are composed of 4 RNA species and approximately 80 structurally distinct proteins. This gene encodes a ribosomal protein that is a component of the 40S subunit. The protein belongs to the S8E family of ribosomal proteins. It is located in the cytoplasm. Increased expression of this gene in colorectal tumors and colon polyps compared to matched normal colonic mucosa has been observed. This gene is co-transcribed with the small nucleolar RNA genes U38A, U38B, U39, and U40, which are located in its fourth, fifth, first, and second introns, respectively. As is typical for genes encoding ribosomal proteins, there are multiple processed pseudogenes of this gene dispersed through the genome.
