= 40S ribosomal protein S11 =

Protein-coding gene in the species Homo sapiens

RPS11

Identifiers
- Aliases: RPS11, S11, ribosomal protein S11
- External IDs: OMIM: 180471; MGI: 1351329; GeneCards: RPS11
Available structures
PDB	Ortholog search: PDBe RCSB
PDB	List of PDB id codes 4UG0, 4V6X, 5A2Q, 5AJ0, 4KZY, 3J7R, 4D61, 4KZX, 4D5L, 4V5Z, 5FLX, 4UJD, 3J7P, 4KZZ, 4UJE, 4UJC

Gene location (Human)
Chr.	Chromosome 19 (human)
Band	19q13.33	Start	49,496,365 bp
Band	19q13.33	End	49,499,708 bp

Gene location (Mouse)
Chr.	Chromosome 7 (mouse)
Band	7|7 B3	Start	44,771,803 bp
Band	7|7 B3	End	44,773,863 bp
RNA expression pattern
Bgee	Human / Mouse (ortholog); Top expressed in: skin of thigh; ganglionic eminence; skin of hip; skin of arm; urethra; human penis; mucosa of sigmoid colon; beta cell; superficial temporal artery; nipple / Top expressed in: epiblast; embryo; ventricular zone; embryo; ganglionic eminence; blastocyst; thymus; morula; zone of skin; ileum; More reference expression data
BioGPS	n/a
Gene ontology
Molecular function	rRNA binding; structural constituent of ribosome; protein binding; RNA binding
Cellular component	cytoplasm; cytosol; ribosome; focal adhesion; intracellular anatomical structure; nucleolus; extracellular exosome; nucleoplasm; extracellular matrix; membrane; cytosolic small ribosomal subunit
Biological process	viral transcription; SRP-dependent cotranslational protein targeting to membrane; translational initiation; nuclear-transcribed mRNA catabolic process, nonsense-mediated decay; protein biosynthesis; rRNA processing; osteoblast differentiation
Sources:Amigo / QuickGO
Orthologs
Databases	NCBI: entry; OMA: entry
Species	Human	Mouse
Entrez	6205	27207
Ensembl	ENSG00000142534	ENSMUSG00000003429
UniProt	P62280	P62281
RefSeq (mRNA)	NM_001015	NM_013725
RefSeq (protein)	NP_001006	NP_038753
Location (UCSC)	Chr 19: 49.5 – 49.5 Mb	Chr 7: 44.77 – 44.77 Mb
PubMed search
- Wikidata
View/Edit Human	View/Edit Mouse

40S ribosomal protein S11 is a protein that in humans is encoded by the RPS11 gene.

Ribosomes, the organelles that catalyze protein synthesis, consist of a small 40S subunit and a large 60S subunit. Together these subunits are composed of 4 RNA species and approximately 80 structurally distinct proteins. This gene encodes a ribosomal protein that is a component of the 40S subunit. The protein belongs to the S17P family of ribosomal proteins. It is located in the cytoplasm. The gene product of the E. coli ortholog (ribosomal protein S17) is thought to be involved in the recognition of termination codons. This gene is co-transcribed with a small nucleolar RNA gene, which is located in its third intron. As is typical for genes encoding ribosomal proteins, there are multiple processed pseudogenes of this gene dispersed through the genome.
