= 40S ribosomal protein S29 =

Protein-coding gene in the species Homo sapiens

RPS29

Identifiers
- Aliases: RPS29, DBA13, S29, ribosomal protein S29, uS14
- External IDs: OMIM: 603633; MGI: 107681; GeneCards: RPS29
Available structures
PDB	Ortholog search: PDBe RCSB
PDB	List of PDB id codes 4UG0, 4V6X, 5A2Q, 5AJ0, 4KZY, 4D61, 5FLX, 4KZX, 4D5L, 4V5Z, 4UJD, 4KZZ, 4UJE, 4UJC

Gene location (Human)
Chr.	Chromosome 14 (human)
Band	14q21.3	Start	49,570,984 bp
Band	14q21.3	End	49,599,164 bp

Gene location (Mouse)
Chr.	Chromosome 12 (mouse)
Band	12|12 C2	Start	69,204,496 bp
Band	12|12 C2	End	69,205,960 bp
RNA expression pattern
Bgee	Human / Mouse (ortholog); Top expressed in: caput epididymis; human penis; parietal pleura; mucosa of sigmoid colon; superficial temporal artery; granulocyte; nipple; ganglionic eminence; corpus epididymis; mucosa of transverse colon / Top expressed in: embryo; epiblast; uterus; yolk sac; embryo; blastocyst; neural tube; ganglionic eminence; ventricular zone; stomach; More reference expression data
BioGPS	n/a
Gene ontology
Molecular function	structural constituent of ribosome; zinc ion binding; metal ion binding
Cellular component	cytosol; ribosome; focal adhesion; intracellular anatomical structure; cytosolic small ribosomal subunit; small ribosomal subunit; extracellular exosome; nucleoplasm; cytoplasm; endoplasmic reticulum; rough endoplasmic reticulum; polysomal ribosome; cytoplasmic side of rough endoplasmic reticulum membrane
Biological process	viral transcription; SRP-dependent cotranslational protein targeting to membrane; translational initiation; nuclear-transcribed mRNA catabolic process, nonsense-mediated decay; protein biosynthesis; rRNA processing; cytoplasmic translation
Sources:Amigo / QuickGO
Orthologs
Databases	NCBI: entry; OMA: entry
Species	Human	Mouse
Entrez	6235	20090
Ensembl	ENSG00000213741	ENSMUSG00000034892
UniProt	P62273	P62274
RefSeq (mRNA)	NM_001032; NM_001030001; NM_001351375	NM_009093
RefSeq (protein)	NP_001023; NP_001025172; NP_001338304	NP_033119
Location (UCSC)	Chr 14: 49.57 – 49.6 Mb	Chr 12: 69.2 – 69.21 Mb
PubMed search
- Wikidata
View/Edit Human	View/Edit Mouse

40S ribosomal protein S29 is a protein that in humans is encoded by the RPS29 gene.

== Function ==
Ribosomes, the organelles that catalyze protein synthesis, consist of a small 40S subunit and a large 60S subunit. Together these subunits are composed of 4 RNA species and approximately 80 structurally distinct proteins. This gene encodes a ribosomal protein that is a component of the 40S subunit and a member of the S14P family of ribosomal proteins. The protein, which contains a C2-C2 zinc finger-like domain that can bind to zinc, can enhance the tumor suppressor activity of Ras-related protein 1A (KREV1). It is located in the cytoplasm. Variable expression of this gene in colorectal cancers compared to adjacent normal tissues has been observed, although no correlation between the level of expression and the severity of the disease has been found. As is typical for genes encoding ribosomal proteins, there are multiple processed pseudogenes of this gene dispersed through the genome.

== Clinical significance ==
Mutations in RPS29 cause Diamond–Blackfan anemia.
