= 40S ribosomal protein S20 =

Protein-coding gene in the species Homo sapiens

RPS20

Identifiers
- Aliases: RPS20, S20, ribosomal protein S20, uS10
- External IDs: OMIM: 603682; MGI: 1914677; GeneCards: RPS20
Available structures
PDB	Ortholog search: PDBe RCSB
PDB	List of PDB id codes 4UG0, 4V6X, 5A2Q, 5AJ0, 5FLX, 4D61, 4KZY, 4KZX, 4UJC, 4D5L, 4UJE, 4V5Z, 4KZZ, 4UJD

Gene location (Human)
Chr.	Chromosome 8 (human)
Band	8q12.1	Start	56,067,254 bp
Band	8q12.1	End	56,074,510 bp

Gene location (Mouse)
Chr.	Chromosome 4 (mouse)
Band	4|4 A1	Start	3,831,334 bp
Band	4|4 A1	End	3,835,665 bp
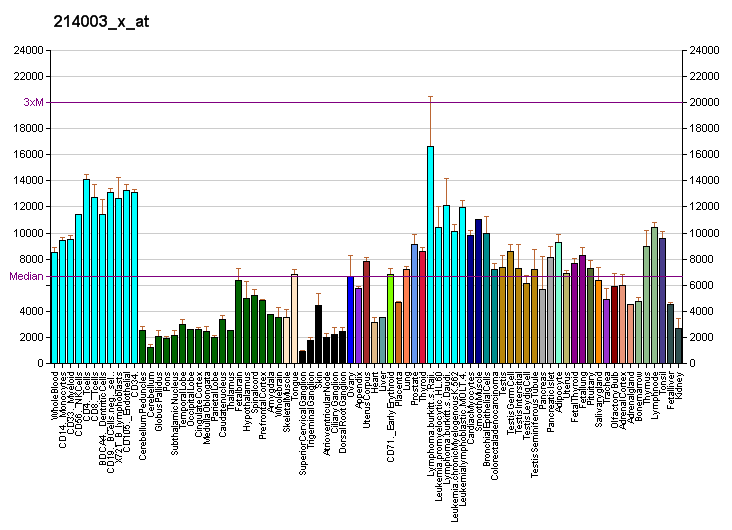

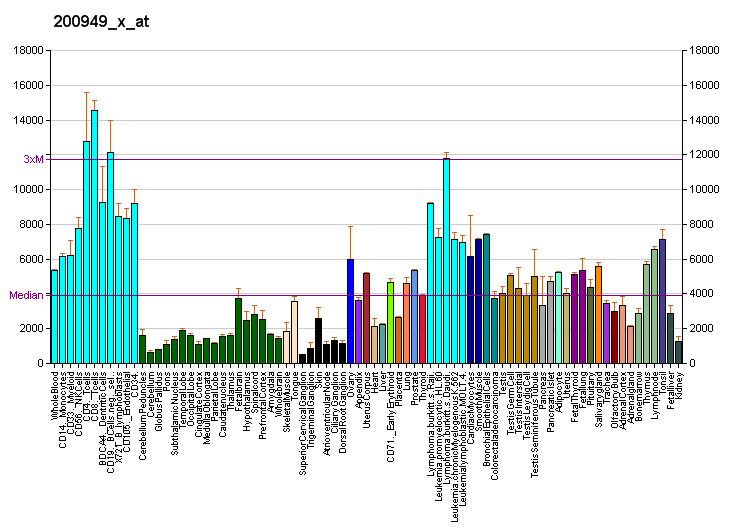
RNA expression pattern
Bgee	Human / Mouse (ortholog); Top expressed in: left ovary; right uterine tube; abdominal fat; right ovary; gastric mucosa; lymph node; peritoneum; right testis; left testis; canal of the cervix / Top expressed in: ventricular zone; blastocyst; lip; embryo; embryo; morula; yolk sac; muscle of thigh; neural layer of retina; superior frontal gyrus; More reference expression data
BioGPS	More reference expression data
Gene ontology
Molecular function	structural constituent of ribosome; protein binding; RNA binding
Cellular component	cytosol; ribosome; membrane; intracellular anatomical structure; cytosolic small ribosomal subunit; small ribosomal subunit; extracellular exosome; nucleoplasm; extracellular matrix; cytoplasm; synapse
Biological process	viral transcription; SRP-dependent cotranslational protein targeting to membrane; translational initiation; nuclear-transcribed mRNA catabolic process, nonsense-mediated decay; protein biosynthesis; rRNA processing; cytoplasmic translation
Sources:Amigo / QuickGO
Orthologs
Databases	NCBI: entry; OMA: entry
Species	Human	Mouse
Entrez	6224	67427
Ensembl	ENSG00000008988	ENSMUSG00000028234
UniProt	P60866	P60867
RefSeq (mRNA)	NM_001146227; NM_001023	NM_026147
RefSeq (protein)	NP_001014; NP_001139699	NP_080423
Location (UCSC)	Chr 8: 56.07 – 56.07 Mb	Chr 4: 3.83 – 3.84 Mb
PubMed search
- Wikidata
View/Edit Human	View/Edit Mouse

40S ribosomal protein S20 is a protein that in humans is encoded by the RPS20 gene.

Ribosomes, the organelles that catalyze protein synthesis, consist of a small 40S subunit and a large 60S subunit. Together these subunits are composed of 4 RNA species and approximately 80 structurally distinct proteins. This gene encodes a ribosomal protein that is a component of the 40S subunit. The protein belongs to the S10P family of ribosomal proteins. It is located in the cytoplasm. This gene is co-transcribed with the small nucleolar RNA gene U54, which is located in its second intron. As is typical for genes encoding ribosomal proteins, there are multiple processed pseudogenes of this gene dispersed through the genome.
