= 40S ribosomal protein S23 =

Protein-coding gene in the species Homo sapiens

RPS23

Identifiers
- Aliases: RPS23, S23, ribosomal protein S23, MABAS, PAMAS, MCINS, BTDD, uS12
- External IDs: OMIM: 603683; MGI: 1913725; GeneCards: RPS23
Available structures
| PDB | Ortholog search: PDBe RCSB |
| PDB | List of PDB id codes 4CXG, 4CXH, 4UG0, 4V6X, 5A2Q, 5AJ0, 4KZY, 4UJC, 4KZX, 4UJE, 4UJD, 4KZZ, 5FLX, 4D61, 4V5Z |

Gene location (Human)
| Chr. | Chromosome 5 (human) |
| Band | 5q14.2 | Start | 82,273,320 bp |
| Band | 5q14.2 | End | 82,278,396 bp |

Gene location (Mouse)
| Chr. | Chromosome 13 (mouse) |
| Band | 13|13 C3 | Start | 91,071,077 bp |
| Band | 13|13 C3 | End | 91,073,069 bp |
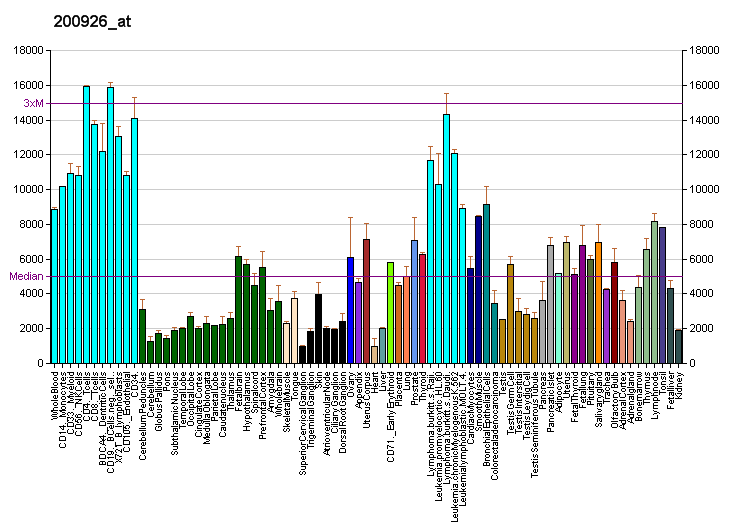
RNA expression pattern
| Bgee | Human / Mouse (ortholog); Top expressed in: skin of hip; lactiferous duct; parietal pleura; lower lobe of lung; skin of thigh; visceral pleura; trabecular bone; superficial temporal artery; mucosa of urinary bladder; germinal epithelium / Top expressed in: epiblast; uterus; ovary; urinary bladder; yolk sac; embryo; embryo; ventricular zone; ganglionic eminence; zone of skin; More reference expression data |
| BioGPS | More reference expression data |
Gene ontology
| Molecular function | protein binding; RNA binding; structural constituent of ribosome |
| Cellular component | cytosol; ribosome; membrane; intracellular anatomical structure; small ribosomal subunit; nucleoplasm; cytosolic small ribosomal subunit; cytoplasm; endoplasmic reticulum; rough endoplasmic reticulum; polysomal ribosome; synapse |
| Biological process | viral transcription; SRP-dependent cotranslational protein targeting to membrane; translational initiation; nuclear-transcribed mRNA catabolic process, nonsense-mediated decay; rRNA processing; protein biosynthesis; stress granule assembly; maintenance of translational fidelity; cytoplasmic translation |
Sources:Amigo / QuickGO
Orthologs
| Databases | NCBI: entry; OMA: entry |
| Species | Human | Mouse |
| Entrez | 6228 | 66475 |
| Ensembl | ENSG00000186468 | ENSMUSG00000049517 |
| UniProt | P62266 | P62267 |
| RefSeq (mRNA) | NM_001025 | NM_024175 |
| RefSeq (protein) | NP_001016 | NP_077137 |
| Location (UCSC) | Chr 5: 82.27 – 82.28 Mb | Chr 13: 91.07 – 91.07 Mb |
| PubMed search |
- Wikidata
| View/Edit Human | View/Edit Mouse |

40S ribosomal protein S23 is a protein that in humans is encoded by the RPS23 gene.

Ribosomes, the organelles that catalyze protein synthesis, consist of a small 40S subunit and a large 60S subunit. Together these subunits are composed of 4 RNA species and approximately 80 structurally distinct proteins. This gene encodes a ribosomal protein that is a component of the 40S subunit. The protein belongs to the S12P family of ribosomal proteins. It is located in the cytoplasm. The protein shares significant amino acid similarity with S. cerevisiae ribosomal protein S28. As is typical for genes encoding ribosomal proteins, there are multiple processed pseudogenes of this gene dispersed through the genome.
