= 40S ribosomal protein S26 =

Protein-coding gene in the species Homo sapiens

RPS26

Identifiers
- Aliases: RPS26, DBA10, S26, ribosomal protein S26, eS26
- External IDs: OMIM: 603701; MGI: 1351628; GeneCards: RPS26
Available structures
PDB	Ortholog search: PDBe RCSB
PDB	List of PDB id codes 4UG0, 4V6X, 5A2Q, 5AJ0, 5FLX, 3J7R, 4D61, 4D5L, 4UJD, 3J7P, 4UJE, 4UJC

Gene location (Human)
Chr.	Chromosome 12 (human)
Band	12q13.2	Start	56,041,351 bp
Band	12q13.2	End	56,044,697 bp

Gene location (Mouse)
Chr.	Chromosome 10 (mouse)
Band	10|10 D3	Start	128,460,403 bp
Band	10|10 D3	End	128,462,616 bp
RNA expression pattern
Bgee	Human / Mouse (ortholog); Top expressed in: granulocyte; left adrenal cortex; mucosa of transverse colon; gastric mucosa; right ovary; right adrenal cortex; right uterine tube; anterior pituitary; olfactory zone of nasal mucosa; left uterine tube / Top expressed in: epiblast; urinary bladder; embryo; bone marrow; embryo; uterus; spleen; adrenal gland; thymus; lens; More reference expression data
BioGPS	n/a
Gene ontology
Molecular function	structural constituent of ribosome; protein binding; mRNA binding; RNA binding; cadherin binding
Cellular component	cytosol; ribosome; membrane; intracellular anatomical structure; cytosolic small ribosomal subunit; small ribosomal subunit; extracellular exosome; nucleoplasm; cytoplasm; endoplasmic reticulum; rough endoplasmic reticulum; polysomal ribosome; cytoplasmic side of rough endoplasmic reticulum membrane
Biological process	viral transcription; SRP-dependent cotranslational protein targeting to membrane; translational initiation; nuclear-transcribed mRNA catabolic process, nonsense-mediated decay; negative regulation of RNA splicing; protein biosynthesis; rRNA processing; cytoplasmic translation
Sources:Amigo / QuickGO
Orthologs
Databases	NCBI: entry; OMA: entry
Species	Human	Mouse
Entrez	6231	27370
Ensembl	ENSG00000197728	ENSMUSG00000025362
UniProt	P62854	P62855
RefSeq (mRNA)	NM_001029	NM_013765
RefSeq (protein)	NP_001020	NP_038793
Location (UCSC)	Chr 12: 56.04 – 56.04 Mb	Chr 10: 128.46 – 128.46 Mb
PubMed search
- Wikidata
View/Edit Human	View/Edit Mouse

40S ribosomal protein S26 is a protein that in humans is encoded by the RPS26 gene.

== Function ==
Ribosomes, the organelles that catalyze protein synthesis, consist of a small 40S subunit and a large 60S subunit. Together these subunits are composed of 4 RNA species and approximately 80 structurally distinct proteins. This gene encodes a ribosomal protein that is a component of the 40S subunit. The protein belongs to the S26E family of ribosomal proteins. It is located in the cytoplasm. As is typical for genes encoding ribosomal proteins, there are multiple processed pseudogenes of this gene dispersed through the genome.
