= 40S ribosomal protein S16 =

Protein-coding gene in the species Homo sapiens

RPS16

Identifiers
- Aliases: RPS16, S16, ribosomal protein S16
- External IDs: OMIM: 603675; MGI: 98118; GeneCards: RPS16
Available structures
PDB	Ortholog search: PDBe RCSB
PDB	List of PDB id codes 4UG0, 4V6X, 5A2Q, 5AJ0, 4KZY, 3J7R, 4D61, 4KZX, 4D5L, 4V5Z, 5FLX, 4UJD, 3J7P, 4KZZ, 4UJE, 4UJC

Gene location (Human)
Chr.	Chromosome 19 (human)
Band	19q13.2	Start	39,433,137 bp
Band	19q13.2	End	39,435,949 bp

Gene location (Mouse)
Chr.	Chromosome 7 (mouse)
Band	7|7 A3	Start	28,050,077 bp
Band	7|7 A3	End	28,052,580 bp
RNA expression pattern
Bgee	Human / Mouse (ortholog); Top expressed in: epithelium of nasopharynx; germinal epithelium; visceral pleura; parietal pleura; superficial temporal artery; skin of hip; nipple; skin of thigh; cardia; pericardium / Top expressed in: yolk sac; epiblast; embryo; spleen; thymus; morula; embryo; lip; pancreas; ventricular zone; More reference expression data
BioGPS	n/a
Gene ontology
Molecular function	structural constituent of ribosome; protein binding; RNA binding
Cellular component	cytosol; ribosome; membrane; focal adhesion; small ribosomal subunit; extracellular exosome; nucleoplasm; extracellular matrix; cytosolic small ribosomal subunit
Biological process	maturation of SSU-rRNA from tricistronic rRNA transcript (SSU-rRNA, 5.8S rRNA, LSU-rRNA); viral transcription; SRP-dependent cotranslational protein targeting to membrane; translational initiation; nuclear-transcribed mRNA catabolic process, nonsense-mediated decay; ribosomal small subunit biogenesis; protein biosynthesis; rRNA processing; cellular response to leukemia inhibitory factor; liver regeneration
Sources:Amigo / QuickGO
Orthologs
Databases	NCBI: entry; OMA: entry
Species	Human	Mouse
Entrez	6217	20055
Ensembl	ENSG00000105193	ENSMUSG00000037563
UniProt	P62249	P14131
RefSeq (mRNA)	NM_001020; NM_001321111; NM_001363860	NM_013647
RefSeq (protein)	NP_001011; NP_001308040; NP_001350789	NP_038675
Location (UCSC)	Chr 19: 39.43 – 39.44 Mb	Chr 7: 28.05 – 28.05 Mb
PubMed search
- Wikidata
View/Edit Human	View/Edit Mouse

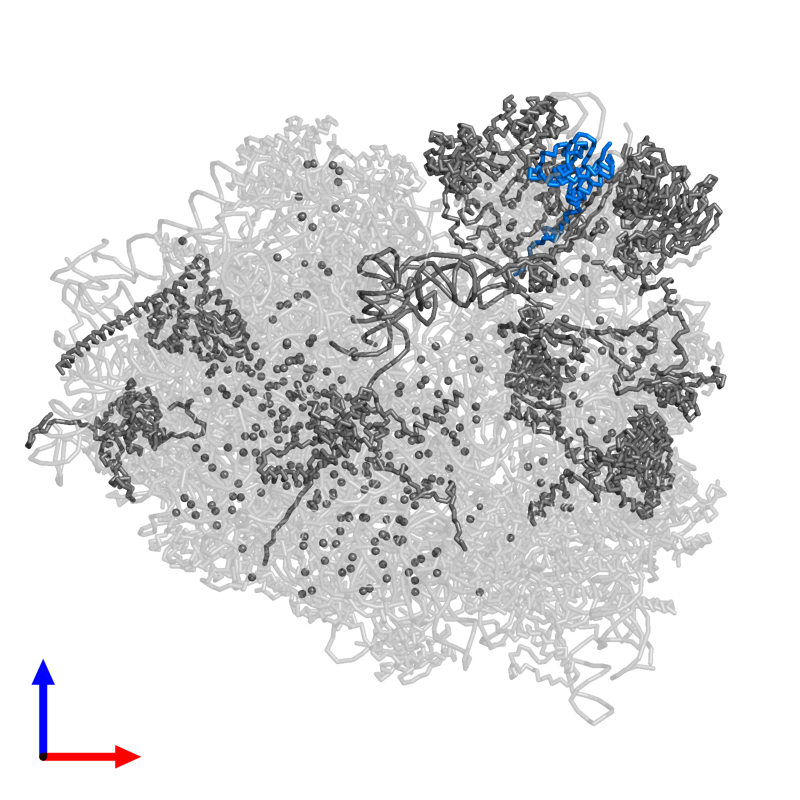
Length: 146 amino acids

40S ribosomal protein S16 is a protein that in humans is encoded by the RPS16 gene.

Ribosomes, the organelles that catalyze protein synthesis, consist of a small 40S subunit and a large 60S subunit. Together these subunits are composed of 4 RNA species and approximately 80 structurally distinct proteins. This gene encodes a ribosomal protein that is a component of the 40S subunit. The protein belongs to the S9P family of ribosomal proteins. It is located in the cytoplasm. As is typical for genes encoding ribosomal proteins, there are multiple processed pseudogenes of this gene dispersed through the genome.

== Interactions ==
Ribosomal protein S16 is one of the proteins from the small ribosomal subunit. It belongs to a ribosomal protein family that is divided into three groups based on sequence similarity:

- Eubacterial S16.
- Algal and plant chloroplast S16.
- Cyanelle S16.
- Neurospora crassa mitochondrial S24 (cyt-21).

S16 proteins have about 100 amino-acid residues. There are two paralogues in Arabidopsis thaliana, RPS16-1 (chloroplastic) and RPS16-2 (targeted to the chloroplast and the mitochondrion).

RPS16 has been shown to interact with CDC5L.
