= 40S ribosomal protein S7 =

Protein found in humans

RPS7

Identifiers
- Aliases: RPS7, DBA8, S7, ribosomal protein S7, eS7
- External IDs: OMIM: 603658; MGI: 1333818; GeneCards: RPS7
Available structures
PDB	Ortholog search: PDBe RCSB
PDB	List of PDB id codes 4UG0, 4V6X, 5A2Q, 5AJ0, 3J7P, 4KZX, 4UJE, 4KZY, 4D5L, 4KZZ, 3J7R, 4UJD, 5FLX, 4D61, 4UJC

Gene location (Human)
Chr.	Chromosome 2 (human)
Band	2p25.3	Start	3,575,260 bp
Band	2p25.3	End	3,580,920 bp

Gene location (Mouse)
Chr.	Chromosome 12 (mouse)
Band	12|12 A2	Start	28,680,853 bp
Band	12|12 A2	End	28,685,952 bp
RNA expression pattern
Bgee	Human / Mouse (ortholog); Top expressed in: gonad; left ovary; granulocyte; ventricular zone; islet of Langerhans; right ovary; rectum; lymph node; smooth muscle tissue; ganglionic eminence / Top expressed in: ganglionic eminence; ventricular zone; lens; lip; yolk sac; thymus; morula; spleen; ovary; dentate gyrus of hippocampal formation granule cell; More reference expression data
BioGPS	n/a
Gene ontology
Molecular function	structural constituent of ribosome; protein binding; RNA binding; mRNA 3'-UTR binding; mRNA 5'-UTR binding; ubiquitin ligase inhibitor activity; protein kinase binding; poly(U) RNA binding
Cellular component	cytosol; ribosome; membrane; focal adhesion; intracellular anatomical structure; microtubule organizing center; nucleolus; extracellular exosome; cytoskeleton; nucleus; nucleoplasm; extracellular matrix; cytoplasm; 90S preribosome; small-subunit processome; centrosome; cytosolic small ribosomal subunit; protein-containing complex; synapse; ribonucleoprotein complex
Biological process	viral transcription; SRP-dependent cotranslational protein targeting to membrane; translational initiation; nuclear-transcribed mRNA catabolic process, nonsense-mediated decay; ribosomal small subunit biogenesis; rRNA processing; protein biosynthesis; cytoplasmic translation; positive regulation of gene expression; protein stabilization; positive regulation of intrinsic apoptotic signaling pathway by p53 class mediator; negative regulation of ubiquitin protein ligase activity; negative regulation of ubiquitin-dependent protein catabolic process; neural tube closure; cell differentiation
Sources:Amigo / QuickGO
Orthologs
Databases	NCBI: entry; OMA: entry
Species	Human	Mouse
Entrez	6201	20115
Ensembl	ENSG00000171863	ENSMUSG00000061477
UniProt	P62081	P62082
RefSeq (mRNA)	NM_001011	NM_011300
RefSeq (protein)	NP_001002	NP_035430
Location (UCSC)	Chr 2: 3.58 – 3.58 Mb	Chr 12: 28.68 – 28.69 Mb
PubMed search
- Wikidata
View/Edit Human	View/Edit Mouse

40S ribosomal protein S7 is a protein that in humans is encoded by the RPS7 gene.

In eukaryotes, ribosomes, the organelles that catalyze protein synthesis, consist of a small 40S subunit and a large 60S subunit. Together these subunits are composed of 4 RNA species and approximately 80 structurally distinct proteins. This gene encodes a ribosomal protein that is a component of the 40S subunit. The protein belongs to the S7E family of ribosomal proteins. It is located in the cytoplasm. As is typical for genes encoding ribosomal proteins, there are multiple processed pseudogenes of this gene dispersed through the genome.
