= 40S ribosomal protein S17 =

Protein-coding gene in the species Homo sapiens

RPS17

Identifiers
- Aliases: RPS17, DBA4, RPS17L, RPS17L1, RPS17L2, S17, ribosomal protein S17
- External IDs: OMIM: 180472; MGI: 1309526; GeneCards: RPS17
Available structures
PDB	Ortholog search: PDBe RCSB
PDB	List of PDB id codes 4UG0, 4V6X, 5A2Q, 5AJ0, 4UJE, 4D5L, 4UJD, 5FLX, 4D61, 4UJC

Gene location (Human)
Chr.	Chromosome 15 (human)
Band	15q25.2	Start	82,536,750 bp
Band	15q25.2	End	82,540,459 bp

Gene location (Mouse)
Chr.	Chromosome 7 (mouse)
Band	7|7 D3	Start	80,992,480 bp
Band	7|7 D3	End	80,995,002 bp
RNA expression pattern
Bgee	Human / Mouse (ortholog); Top expressed in: ganglionic eminence; corpus callosum; left ovary; ventricular zone; right ovary; skin of abdomen; skin of leg; lymph node; Achilles tendon; right uterine tube / Top expressed in: embryo; ventricular zone; embryo; morula; lip; blastocyst; yolk sac; dentate gyrus of hippocampal formation granule cell; muscle of thigh; neural layer of retina; More reference expression data
BioGPS	n/a
Gene ontology
Molecular function	structural constituent of ribosome; RNA binding
Cellular component	cytosol; ribosome; membrane; focal adhesion; intracellular anatomical structure; cytosolic small ribosomal subunit; extracellular exosome; nucleoplasm; extracellular matrix; synapse
Biological process	viral transcription; SRP-dependent cotranslational protein targeting to membrane; erythrocyte homeostasis; translational initiation; ribosomal small subunit assembly; nuclear-transcribed mRNA catabolic process, nonsense-mediated decay; ribosomal small subunit biogenesis; protein biosynthesis; rRNA processing
Sources:Amigo / QuickGO
Orthologs
Databases	NCBI: entry; OMA: entry
Species	Human	Mouse
Entrez	6218	20068
Ensembl	ENSG00000278229; ENSG00000182774	ENSMUSG00000061787
UniProt	P08708	P63276
RefSeq (mRNA)	NM_001021; NM_001199057	NM_009092
RefSeq (protein)	NP_001012	NP_033118
Location (UCSC)	Chr 15: 82.54 – 82.54 Mb	Chr 7: 80.99 – 81 Mb
PubMed search
- Wikidata
View/Edit Human	View/Edit Mouse

40S ribosomal protein S17 is a protein that in humans is encoded by the RPS17 gene.

Ribosomes, the organelles that catalyze protein synthesis, consist of a small 40S subunit and a large 60S subunit. Together these subunits are composed of 4 RNA species and approximately 80 structurally distinct proteins. This gene encodes a ribosomal protein that is a component of the 40S subunit. The protein belongs to the S17E family of ribosomal proteins. It is located in the cytoplasm. As is typical for genes encoding ribosomal proteins, there are multiple processed pseudogenes of this gene dispersed through the genome.
