= Ribosomal protein SA =

Protein-coding gene in the species Homo sapiens

RPSA

Identifiers
- Aliases: RPSA, 37LRP, 67LR, ICAS, LAMBR, LAMR1, LBP, LBP/p40, LRP, LRP/LR, NEM/1CHD4, SA, lamR, p40, Ribosomal protein SA
- External IDs: OMIM: 150370; MGI: 105381; GeneCards: RPSA
Available structures
PDB	Ortholog search: PDBe RCSB
PDB	List of PDB id codes 3BCH, 4UG0, 4V6X, 5A2Q, 5AJ0, 4UJE, 4D5L, 4UJD, 5FLX, 4D61

Gene location (Human)
Chr.	Chromosome 3 (human)
Band	3p22.1	Start	39,406,716 bp
Band	3p22.1	End	39,412,542 bp

Gene location (Mouse)
Chr.	Chromosome 9 (mouse)
Band	9 F4|9 71.41 cM	Start	119,956,755 bp
Band	9 F4|9 71.41 cM	End	119,961,435 bp
RNA expression pattern
Bgee	Human / Mouse (ortholog); Top expressed in: gonad; right uterine tube; ganglionic eminence; ventricular zone; left ovary; right ovary; islet of Langerhans; body of pancreas; mucosa of transverse colon; spleen / Top expressed in: ventricular zone; epiblast; ganglionic eminence; uterus; spleen; bone marrow; lens; thymus; islet of Langerhans; zone of skin; More reference expression data
BioGPS	n/a
Gene ontology
Molecular function	virus receptor activity; structural constituent of ribosome; ribosome binding; laminin receptor activity; protein binding; RNA binding; laminin binding
Cellular component	cytoplasm; cytosol; ribosome; membrane; plasma membrane; intracellular anatomical structure; small ribosomal subunit; extracellular exosome; nucleus; 90S preribosome; nucleoplasm; cytosolic small ribosomal subunit
Biological process	endonucleolytic cleavage to generate mature 3'-end of SSU-rRNA from (SSU-rRNA, 5.8S rRNA, LSU-rRNA); endonucleolytic cleavage in ITS1 to separate SSU-rRNA from 5.8S rRNA and LSU-rRNA from tricistronic rRNA transcript (SSU-rRNA, 5.8S rRNA, LSU-rRNA); viral transcription; SRP-dependent cotranslational protein targeting to membrane; translational initiation; rRNA export from nucleus; viral entry into host cell; nuclear-transcribed mRNA catabolic process, nonsense-mediated decay; protein biosynthesis; viral process; rRNA processing; ribosomal small subunit assembly; cell adhesion; cytoplasmic translation
Sources:Amigo / QuickGO
Orthologs
Databases	NCBI: entry; OMA: entry
Species	Human	Mouse
Entrez	3921	16785
Ensembl	ENSG00000168028	ENSMUSG00000032518
UniProt	P08865	P14206
RefSeq (mRNA)	NM_002295; NM_001304288	NM_011029
RefSeq (protein)	NP_001291217; NP_002286	NP_035159
Location (UCSC)	Chr 3: 39.41 – 39.41 Mb	Chr 9: 119.96 – 119.96 Mb
PubMed search
- Wikidata
View/Edit Human	View/Edit Mouse

40S ribosomal protein SA is a ribosomal protein that in humans is encoded by the RPSA gene. It also acts as a cell surface receptor, in particular for laminin, and is involved in several pathogenic processes.

This protein has been variously called Ribosomal protein SA; RPSA; LamR; LamR1; 37 kDa Laminin Receptor Precursor; 37LRP; 67 kDa Laminin Receptor; 67LR; 37/67 kDa Laminin Receptor; LRP/LR; LBP/p40; and p40 ribosome-associated protein. Ribosomal protein SA and RPSA are the approved name and symbol.

== Gene ==
Multiple copies of the RPSA-like gene exist; however, most of them are pseudogenes thought to have arisen from retropositional events. Two alternatively spliced transcript variants encoding the same protein have been found for this gene.

The complementary DNA (cDNA) of the RPSA gene is formed by the assembly of seven exons, six of which correspond to the coding sequence.

== Structure ==
The amino acid sequence of RPSA, deduced from the sequence of its cDNA, includes 295 residues. RPSA can be sub-divided in two main domains: an N-domain (residues 1–209), which corresponds to exons 2-5 of the gene, and a C-domain (residues 210–295), which corresponds to exons 6–7. The N-domain of RPSA is homologous to the ribosomal protein S2 (RPS2) of prokaryotes. It contains a palindromic sequence 173LMWWML178 which is conserved in all metazoans. Its C-domain is highly conserved in vertebrates. The amino acid sequence of RPSA is 98% identical in all mammals. RPSA is a ribosomal protein which has acquired the function of laminin receptor during evolution. The structure of the N-domain of RPSA is similar to those of prokaryotic RPS2. The C-domain is intrinsically disordered in solution. The N-domain is monomeric in solution and unfolds according to a three state equilibrium. The folding intermediate is predominant at 37 °C.

== Function ==
Laminins, a family of extracellular matrix glycoproteins, are the major noncollagenous constituent of basement membranes. They have been implicated in a wide variety of biological processes including cell adhesion, differentiation, migration, signaling, neurite outgrowth and metastasis. Many of the effects of laminin are mediated through interactions with cell surface receptors. These receptors include members of the integrin family, as well as non-integrin laminin-binding proteins. The RPSA gene encodes a multifunctional protein, which is both a ribosomal protein and a high-affinity, non-integrin laminin receptor.

The amino acid sequence of RPSA is highly conserved through evolution, suggesting a key biological function.

== Tissue distribution ==
It has been observed that the level of RPSA transcript is higher in colon carcinoma tissue and lung cancer cell lines than their normal counterparts. Also, there is a correlation between the upregulation of this polypeptide in cancer cells and their invasive and metastatic phenotype.

== Interactions ==
Several interactions of RPSA that had originally been discovered by methods of cellular biology, have subsequently been confirmed by using recombinant derivatives and in vitro experiments. The latter have shown that the folded N-domain and disordered C-domain of RPSA have both common and specific functions.

- RPSA binds to proteins that are involved in the translation of the genetic code. (i) Yeast two-hybrid screens have shown that RPSA binds to Ribosomal protein S21 of the 40S small ribosomal subunit. (ii) Serial deletions of RPSA have shown that the segment of residues 236–262, included in the C-domain, is involved in the interaction between RPSA and the 40S subunit of ribosome. (iii) Studies that were based on nuclear magnetic resonance spectroscopy (NMR), have shown that the anticodon binding domain of Lysyl-tRNA synthetase binds directly to the C-domain of RPSA.
- RPSA was initially identified as a laminin binding protein. Both recombinant N-domain and C-domain of RPSA bind laminin in vitro, and they bind with similar dissociation constants (300 nM).
- Both RPSA and laminin belong to the heparin/heparan sulfate interactome. Heparin binds in vitro to the N-domain of RPSA but not to its C-domain. Moreover, the C-domain of RPSA and heparin compete for binding to laminin, which shows that the highly acidic C-domain of RPSA mimicks heparin (and potentially heparan sulfates) for the binding to laminin.
- RPSA is a potential cellular receptor for several pathogenic Flaviviruses, including the dengue virus (DENV), and Alphaviruses, including the Sindbis virus (SINV). The N-domain of RPSA includes a binding site for SINV in vitro. The N-domain also includes weak binding sites for recombinant domain 3 (ED3, residues 296–400) from the envelope proteins of two Flaviviruses, West-Nile virus and serotype 2 of DENV. The C-domain includes weak binding sites for domain 3 of the yellow fever virus (YFV) and of serotypes 1 and 2 of DENV. In contrast, domain 3 from the Japanese encephalitis virus does not appear to bind RPSA in vitro.
- RPSA is also a receptor for small molecules. (i) RPSA binds aflatoxin B1 both in vivo and in vitro. (ii) RPSA is a receptor for epigallocatechin-gallate (EGCG), which is a major constituent of green tea and has many health related effects. EGCG binds only to the N-domain of RPSA in vitro, with a dissociation constant of 100 nM, but not to its C-domain.
