= 40S ribosomal protein S4, Y isoform 1 =

Protein-coding gene in the species Homo sapiens

RPS4Y1

Identifiers
- Aliases: RPS4Y1, RPS4Y, S4, ribosomal protein S4, Y-linked 1, ribosomal protein S4 Y-linked 1
- External IDs: OMIM: 470000; MGI: 98158; GeneCards: RPS4Y1
Available structures
PDB	Ortholog search: PDBe RCSB
PDB	List of PDB id codes 5AJ0, 5FLX, 4D61, 4D5L, 4UJD, 4UJE, 4UJC

Gene location (Mouse)
Chr.	X chromosome (mouse)
Band	X D|X 45.2 cM	Start	101,228,547 bp
Band	X D|X 45.2 cM	End	101,233,000 bp
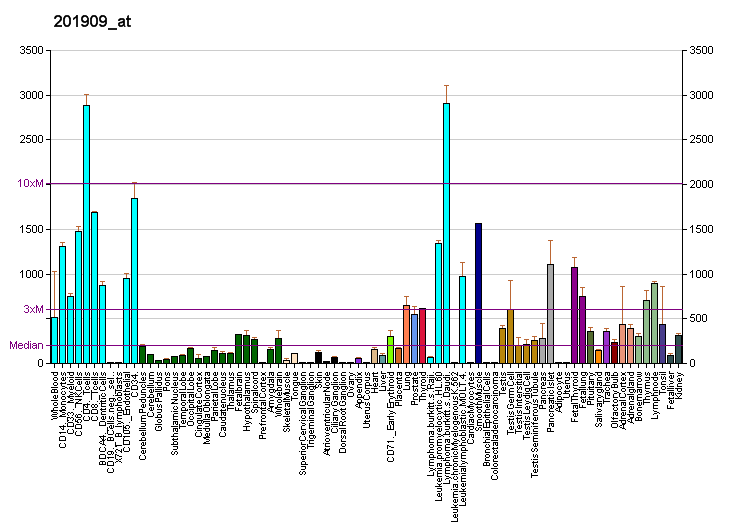
RNA expression pattern
Bgee	Human / Mouse (ortholog); Top expressed in: caput epididymis; prostate; human penis; right lung; corpus epididymis; rectum; trabecular bone; urethra; synovial joint; seminal vesicula / Top expressed in: epiblast; ventricular zone; ganglionic eminence; uterus; zone of skin; spleen; esophagus; thymus; embryo; urinary bladder; More reference expression data
BioGPS	More reference expression data
Gene ontology
Molecular function	rRNA binding; structural constituent of ribosome; RNA binding
Cellular component	ribosome; polysome; cytosol; nucleus; membrane; intracellular anatomical structure; nucleoplasm; cytosolic small ribosomal subunit
Biological process	SRP-dependent cotranslational protein targeting to membrane; viral transcription; multicellular organism development; nuclear-transcribed mRNA catabolic process, nonsense-mediated decay; translational initiation; protein biosynthesis; rRNA processing
Sources:Amigo / QuickGO
Orthologs
Databases	NCBI: entry
Species	Human	Mouse
Entrez	6192	20102
Ensembl	n/a	ENSMUSG00000031320
UniProt	P22090	P62702
RefSeq (mRNA)	NM_001008	NM_009094
RefSeq (protein)	NP_000999	NP_033120
Location (UCSC)	n/a	Chr X: 101.23 – 101.23 Mb
PubMed search
- Wikidata
View/Edit Human	View/Edit Mouse

40S ribosomal protein S4, Y isoform 1 is a protein that in humans is encoded by the RPS4Y1 gene.

Cytoplasmic ribosomes, organelles that catalyze protein synthesis, consist of a small 40S subunit and a large 60S subunit. Together these subunits are composed of 4 RNA species and approximately 80 structurally distinct proteins. This gene encodes ribosomal protein S4, a component of the 40S subunit. Ribosomal protein S4 is the only ribosomal protein known to be encoded by more than one gene, namely this gene, RPS4Y2 and the ribosomal protein S4, X-linked (RPS4X). The 3 isoforms encoded by these genes are not identical, but appear to be functionally equivalent. Ribosomal protein S4 belongs to the S4E family of ribosomal proteins. It has been suggested that haploinsufficiency of the ribosomal protein S4 genes plays a role in Turner syndrome; however, this hypothesis is controversial.

== See also ==
- S4 protein domain
