= 40S ribosomal protein S4, Y isoform 2 =

Mammalian protein found in Homo sapiens

RPS4Y2

Identifiers
- Aliases: RPS4Y2, RPS4Y2P, ribosomal protein S4, Y-linked 2, ribosomal protein S4 Y-linked 2
- External IDs: OMIM: 400030; GeneCards: RPS4Y2

Gene location (Human)
Chr.	Y chromosome (human)
Band	Yq11.223	Start	20,756,108 bp
Band	Yq11.223	End	20,781,032 bp
RNA expression pattern
Bgee	Human / Mouse (ortholog); Top expressed in: testicle; gonad; right testis; left testis; prostate; ganglionic eminence; bone marrow; ventricular zone; blood; muscle of thigh / n/a; More reference expression data
BioGPS	n/a
Gene ontology
Molecular function	structural constituent of ribosome; rRNA binding; RNA binding; molecular function
Cellular component	cytosolic small ribosomal subunit; ribosome; intracellular anatomical structure; cellular component
Biological process	protein biosynthesis; biological process
Sources:Amigo / QuickGO
Orthologs
Databases	NCBI: entry; OMA: entry
Species	Human	Mouse
Entrez	140032	n/a
Ensembl	ENSG00000280969	n/a
UniProt	Q8TD47	n/a
RefSeq (mRNA)	NM_001039567; NM_138963	n/a
RefSeq (protein)	NP_001034656	n/a
Location (UCSC)	Chr Y: 20.76 – 20.78 Mb	n/a
PubMed search		n/a
- Wikidata
View/Edit Human

ribosomal protein S4, Y-linked 2

Identifiers
- Symbol: RPS4Y2
- Alt. symbols: RPS4Y2P
- NCBI gene: 140032
- HGNC: 18501
- RefSeq: NM_001039567
- UniProt: Q8TD47

Other data
- Locus: Chr. Y q11.223
Search for
- Structures: Swiss-model
- Domains: InterPro

Ribosomal protein S4, Y-linked 2 also known as RPS4Y2 is a protein which in humans is encoded by the RPS4Y2 gene which resides on the Y chromosome.

== Function ==
Cytoplasmic ribosomes, organelles that catalyze protein synthesis, consist of a small 40S subunit and a large 60S subunit. Together these subunits are composed of 4 RNA species and approximately 80 structurally distinct proteins. This gene encodes ribosomal protein S4, a component of the 40S subunit. Ribosomal protein S4 is the only ribosomal protein known to be encoded by more than one gene, namely this gene, RPS4Y1 and the ribosomal protein S4, X-linked (RPS4X). The 3 isoforms encoded by these genes are not identical, but appear to be functionally equivalent. Ribosomal protein S4 belongs to the S4E family of ribosomal proteins. It has been suggested that haploinsufficiency of the ribosomal protein S4 genes plays a role in Turner syndrome; however, this hypothesis is controversial.
