= SON (gene) =

Protein-coding gene in humans

Identifiers
- Aliases: SON, BASS1, C21orf50, DBP-5, NREBP, SON3, SON DNA binding protein, TOKIMS, SON DNA and RNA binding protein
- External IDs: OMIM: 182465; MGI: 98353; GeneCards: SON

Gene location (Human)
Chr.	Chromosome 21 (human)
Band	21q22.11	Start	33,543,038 bp
Band	21q22.11	End	33,577,481 bp

Gene location (Mouse)
Chr.	Chromosome 16 (mouse)
Band	16 C3.3- C4|16 53.22 cM	Start	91,444,394 bp
Band	16 C3.3- C4|16 53.22 cM	End	91,476,109 bp
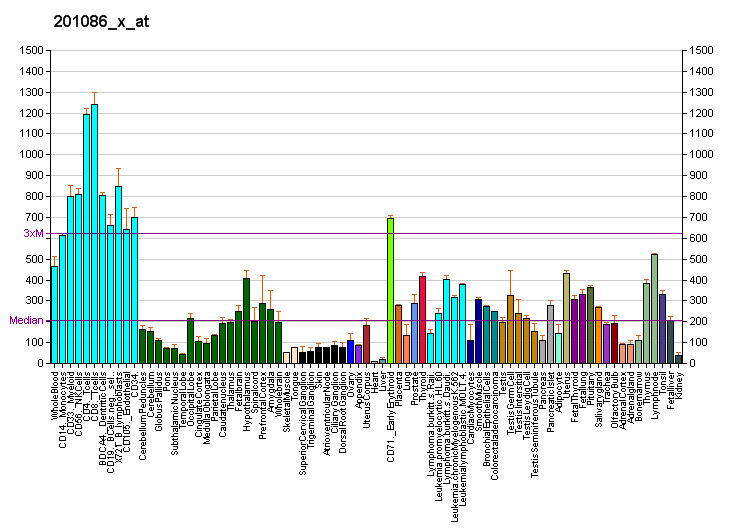

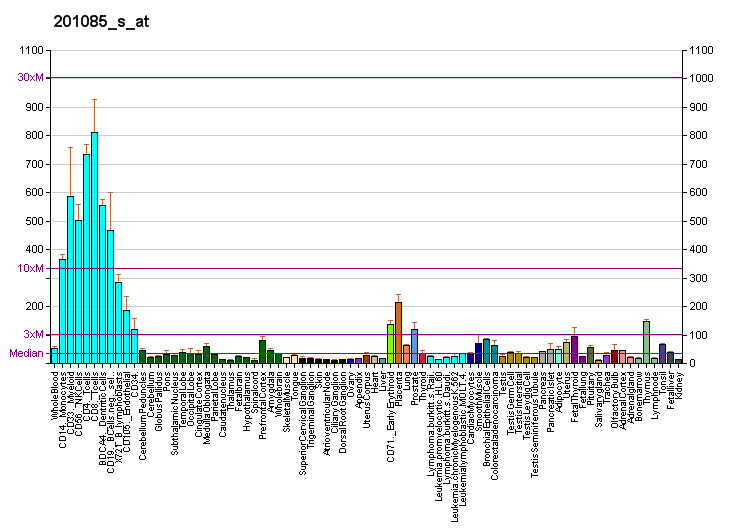

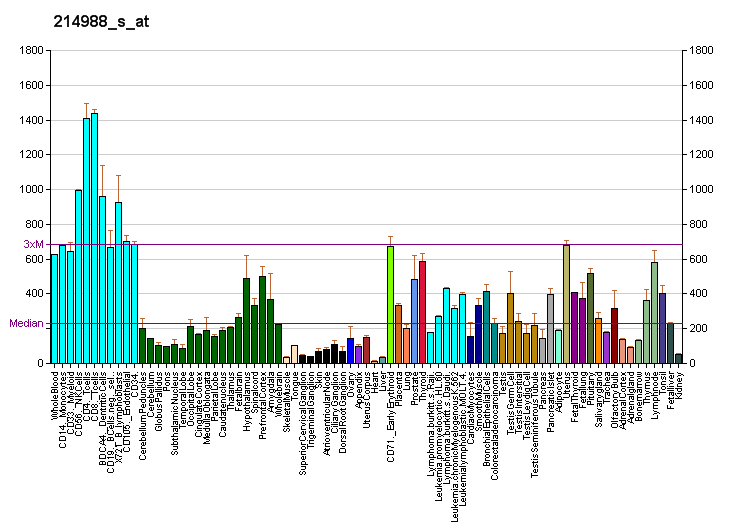
RNA expression pattern
Bgee	Human / Mouse (ortholog); Top expressed in: pylorus; tendon of biceps brachii; cardia; nipple; trabecular bone; renal medulla; pericardium; right uterine tube; trigeminal ganglion; seminal vesicula / Top expressed in: tunica media of zone of aorta; neural layer of retina; retinal pigment epithelium; ciliary body; vas deferens; right lung lobe; Rostral migratory stream; efferent ductule; crypt of lieberkuhn of small intestine; maxillary prominence; More reference expression data
BioGPS	More reference expression data
Gene ontology
Molecular function	RS domain binding; protein binding; RNA binding; DNA binding; nucleic acid binding
Cellular component	nuclear speck; nucleus
Biological process	regulation of cell cycle; cell cycle; mRNA processing; negative regulation of apoptotic process; microtubule cytoskeleton organization; RNA splicing; regulation of mRNA splicing, via spliceosome; mitotic cytokinesis; regulation of RNA splicing
Sources:Amigo / QuickGO
Orthologs
Databases	NCBI: entry; OMA: entry
Species	Human	Mouse
Entrez	6651	20658
Ensembl	ENSG00000159140	ENSMUSG00000022961
UniProt	P18583	Q9QX47
RefSeq (mRNA)	NM_001291411; NM_001291412; NM_003103; NM_032195; NM_138925 NM_138927	NM_019973; NM_178880
RefSeq (protein)	NP_001278340; NP_001278341; NP_115571; NP_620305	NP_064357; NP_849211
Location (UCSC)	Chr 21: 33.54 – 33.58 Mb	Chr 16: 91.44 – 91.48 Mb
PubMed search
- Wikidata
View/Edit Human	View/Edit Mouse

SON protein is a protein that in humans is encoded by the SON gene.

SON is the name that has been given to a large Ser/Arg (SR)-related protein, which is a splicing co-factor that contributes to an efficient splicing within cell cycle progression. It is also known as BASS1 (Bax antagonist selected in saccharomyces 1) or NRE-binding protein (Negative regulatory element-binding protein). The most common gene name of this splicing protein is SON, but C21orf50, DBP5, KIAA1019 and NREBP can also be used as synonyms.

The protein encoded by SON gene binds to a specific DNA sequence upstream of the upstream regulatory sequence of the core promoter and second enhancer of human hepatitis B virus (HBV). Through this binding, it represses HBV core promoter activity, transcription of HBV genes, and production of HBV virions. The protein shows sequence similarities with other DNA-binding structural proteins such as gallin, oncoproteins of the MYC family, and the oncoprotein MOS. It may also be involved in protecting cells from apoptosis and in pre-mRNA splicing.

Loss-of-function variants in the SON gene are causative for an ultra-rare, neurodevelopmental, and multisystemic disorder, ZTTK syndrome.

== Structure ==
The sequence length of the SON protein consists in 2426 aminoacids and its sequence status is totally completed. Its molecular weight is 263,830 daltons (Da) and its domain contains 8 types of repeats which are distributed in 3 regions. This protein is mostly located in nuclear speckles. Its higher expression is seen in leukocyte and heart cells.

== Splicing process ==
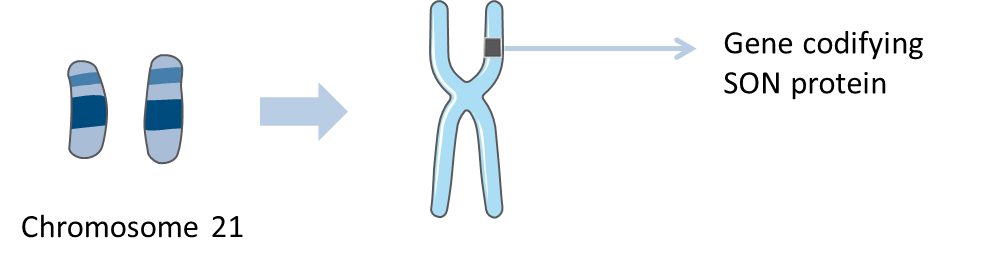
Location of the gene that encodes the SON protein.

SON protein is essential for maintaining the subnuclear organization of the factors that are processed in the nucleus highlighting its direct role in pre-mRNA splicing.

Splicing is the process through which pre-mRNA is transformed into mRNA. The pre-mRNA which has just been transcribed contains sequences called introns and exons. Introns are non-active nucleotide sequences that must be removed in order for the exons (active sequences) to be joined together forming mRNA. The controlled process of splicing takes place in the spliceosome, a complex that brings together pre-mRNA and a variety of binding proteins. These proteins together with the splicing factors (which are not found in the spliceosome) are in charge of recognizing the 5' ("donor") splice site, 3' ("acceptor") splice site, and branch point sequence within the intron. The SON protein is known to be one of these binding proteins.

Although there is a lack of knowledge about its exact splicing control in the progression of the cell cycle and it has remained largely unexplored, it’s certain that this splicing-associated protein is necessary for the maintenance of the embryonic stem cells because it influences the splicing of pluripotency regulators.

SON plays an important role in the mRNA processing. The SON protein not only interferes in the splicing, but also makes complex mechanisms such as the RNA post-transcriptional to cooperate with the splicing-mRNA processing. The specific process is a uncertain, and scientists are still trying to understand how exactly this protein interacts with the spliceosomal complex, its exact molecular function in the context of splicing.

Human embryonic stem cells are able to undergo the process of differentiation into specific and relevant cells. To maintain the pluripotency of the embryonic stem cells, transcription factors and epigenetic modifiers play an important role despite the fact that little is known about the regulation of pluripotency throughout the process of splicing. The factor SON is identified as essential for the maintenance of this pluripotency. It is confirmed that SON regulates the splicing process of transcripts (RNAm) that will encode the gens that are going to regulate the pluripotency of the embryonic human cells.

== Function ==
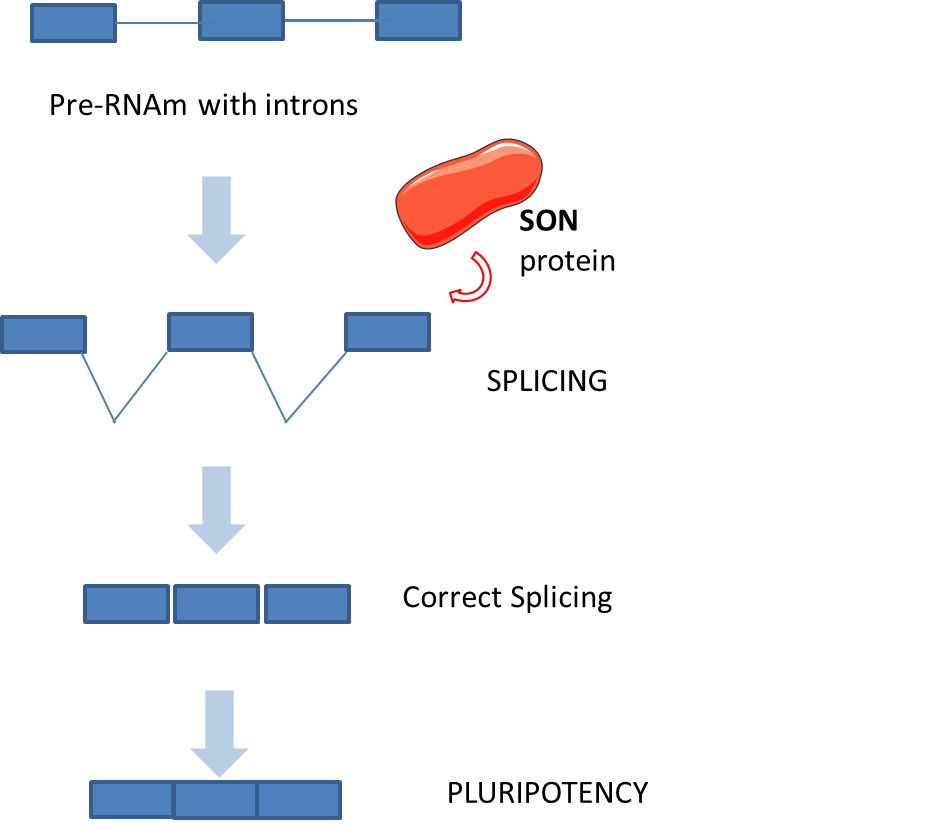
SON protein's intervention in the splicing process.

On the one hand, SON protein is required to maintain the genome stability in order to ensure an efficient RNA processing of affected genes. It also facilitates the interaction of SR proteins with RNA polymerase II and is required for processing of weak constitutive splice sites, having also strong implications in cancer and other human diseases.

On the other side, a deficiency or knockdown of SON protein causes various and severe defects in mitotic division arrangement, chromosome alignment and microtubule dynamics when spindle pole separation takes place.

But as we could read in the article called “SON protein regulates GATA-2 through transcriptional control of the microRNA 23a-27-24-a clúster”, SON protein has even more functions in the organism. It has been found that these proteins may regulate the hematopoietic cells differentiation. They have a specific job in hematopoietic process, which is based on activating other proteins called GATA. As these ones are finally activated, the cell differentiation starts normally.

== Clinical significance ==
De novo heterozygous, loss-of-function variants in SON were identified in individuals presenting with intellectual disability in four concurrent papers published between 2015 and 2016. The genetic syndrome was subsequently named Zhu-Tokita-Takenouchi-Kim (ZTTK) syndrome after the first authors on these initial studies. ZTTK syndrome is an ultra-rare disorder, with only 79 published cases worldwide. Individuals with ZTTK present heterogeneously with wide-ranging symptoms including intellectual disability, global developmental delay, hypotonia, craniofacial features, heart defects, scoliosis, feeding difficulties, cortical visual impairment, metabolic impairment, immunological concerns, and more. While most clinical features are variable across individuals with ZTTK syndrome, 100% of individuals with ZTTK have some type of neurological involvement.

SON plays a critical role in regulating splicing of genes essential for neuronal migration and metabolism. A 2016 paper by Kim et al. compared the results of SON knockdown across three datasets and identified 11 genes directly related to intellectual disability, developmental delay, and metabolism that are downregulated by SON knockdown, including TUBG1, FLNA, PNKP, WDR62, PSMD3, HDAC6, ACY1, ADA, PCK2, IDH2, and PFKL. Downregulation of these target genes was also seen in individuals with ZTTK syndrome.

A recent study suggested that SON may be a novel therapeutic molecular target for pancreatic cancer as the results of a recent study show that this protein is very important as far as proliferation, survival and tumorigenicity of cancer cells are concerned. Specifically, these results revealed that the serine-arginine-rich protein involved in the RNA splicing process, could suppress pancreatic cell tumorigenicity.

The therapeutic implications of the SON gene within virus-host interactions, particularly in the context of viral infections, remain insufficiently defined. Although the SON gene is recognized for its engagement in diverse cellular processes like mRNA splicing, DNA repair, and cell cycle regulation, its precise involvement in the host's response to viral infections and its therapeutic applications remain ambiguous). Ongoing research is dedicated to unraveling the intricate interactions between host genes, including SON, and HIV-1. This pursuit aims to enhance our comprehension of the dynamics between viruses and hosts, with the potential to unveil novel targets for therapeutic interventions.

=== RNA processing and viral replication ===
SON plays a crucial role in mRNA splicing, a vital process for gene expression. Certain viruses depend on the host's cellular machinery, including the splicing apparatus, for their replication. Disrupting host factors involved in RNA processing could potentially impede viral replication. Aberrations in splicing processes may lead to abnormal protein production and contribute to disease. Given SON's involvement in RNA processing, it emerges as a promising target for comprehending and treating conditions associated with splicing abnormalities.

=== Genetic and epigenetic approaches ===
In the event that SON is identified as a contributor to either promoting or inhibiting viral replication, there is potential for exploring genetic or epigenetic strategies. This could involve manipulating SON expression or activity to influence the viral life cycle.

=== Immunomodulation ===
Host factors also play a role in shaping the immune response to viral infections. If SON is implicated in pathways related to the immune system, modulating its activity could have implications for enhancing the host's capacity to control viral infections.
