= NUMBL =

Protein-coding gene in the species Homo sapiens

Available structures
PDB	Ortholog search: PDBe RCSB
PDB	List of PDB id codes 3F0W

Identifiers
- Aliases: NUMBL, CAG3A, CTG3a, NBL, NUMB-R, NUMBLIKE, NUMBR, TNRC23, NUMB like, endocytic adaptor protein, NUMB like endocytic adaptor protein
- External IDs: OMIM: 604018; MGI: 894702; HomoloGene: 68413; GeneCards: NUMBL; OMA:NUMBL - orthologs

Gene location (Human)
Chr.	Chromosome 19 (human)
Band	19q13.2	Start	40,665,905 bp
Band	19q13.2	End	40,690,972 bp

Gene location (Mouse)
Chr.	Chromosome 7 (mouse)
Band	7|7 A3	Start	26,957,858 bp
Band	7|7 A3	End	26,981,569 bp
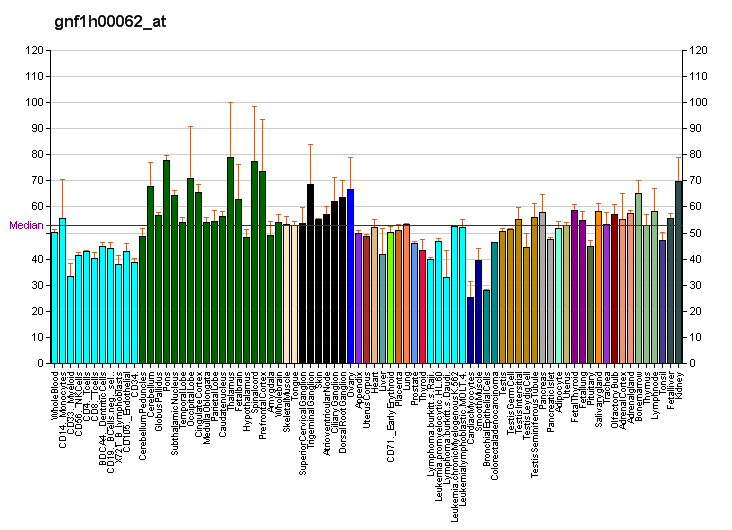
RNA expression pattern
Bgee	Human / Mouse (ortholog); Top expressed in: pancreatic ductal cell; buccal mucosa cell; cardia; trigeminal ganglion; nipple; trachea; endothelial cell; pylorus; ventral tegmental area; spinal ganglia / Top expressed in: dentate gyrus of hippocampal formation granule cell; primary visual cortex; superior frontal gyrus; ventricular zone; lip; piriform cortex; hippocampus proper; ganglionic eminence; cerebellar cortex; subiculum; More reference expression data
BioGPS	More reference expression data
Gene ontology
Molecular function	protein binding
Cellular component	cytoplasm
Biological process	multicellular organism development; positive regulation of neurogenesis; neuroblast proliferation; forebrain development; protein metabolic process; adherens junction organization; neuroblast division in subventricular zone; axonogenesis; lateral ventricle development; nervous system development; cytokine-mediated signaling pathway
Sources:Amigo / QuickGO
Orthologs
Species	Human	Mouse
Entrez	9253	18223
Ensembl	ENSG00000105245	ENSMUSG00000063160
UniProt	Q9Y6R0	O08919
RefSeq (mRNA)	NM_001289979; NM_001289980; NM_004756	NM_010950
RefSeq (protein)	NP_001276908; NP_001276909; NP_004747	NP_035080
Location (UCSC)	Chr 19: 40.67 – 40.69 Mb	Chr 7: 26.96 – 26.98 Mb
PubMed search
- Wikidata
View/Edit Human	View/Edit Mouse

Numb-like protein is a protein that in humans is encoded by the NUMBL gene.

== Interactions ==
NUMBL has been shown to interact with MAP3K7IP2.
