= Calsenilin =

Protein found in humans

KCNIP3

Identifiers
- Aliases: KCNIP3, CSEN, DREAM, KCHIP3, potassium voltage-gated channel interacting protein 3
- External IDs: OMIM: 604662; MGI: 1929258; GeneCards: KCNIP3
Available structures
| PDB | Ortholog search: PDBe RCSB |
| PDB | List of PDB id codes 2E6W |

Gene location (Mouse)
| Chr. | Chromosome 2 (mouse) |
| Band | 2|2 F1 | Start | 127,298,418 bp |
| Band | 2|2 F1 | End | 127,364,014 bp |
RNA expression pattern
| Bgee | Human / Mouse (ortholog); Top expressed in: prefrontal cortex; Brodmann area 9; left lobe of thyroid gland; amygdala; right lobe of thyroid gland; nucleus accumbens; caudate nucleus; hypothalamus; putamen; hippocampus proper / Top expressed in: lumbar spinal ganglion; primary visual cortex; superior frontal gyrus; piriform cortex; dentate gyrus of hippocampal formation granule cell; cerebellar cortex; medial dorsal nucleus; subiculum; prefrontal cortex; medial geniculate nucleus; More reference expression data |
| BioGPS | n/a |
Gene ontology
| Molecular function | DNA binding; calcium ion binding; sequence-specific DNA binding; potassium channel activity; transcription corepressor activity; voltage-gated ion channel activity; metal ion binding; RNA polymerase II cis-regulatory region sequence-specific DNA binding; DNA-binding transcription repressor activity, RNA polymerase II-specific; protein binding; potassium channel regulator activity; transmembrane transporter binding |
| Cellular component | cytoplasm; axon terminus; cytosol; Golgi apparatus; membrane; voltage-gated potassium channel complex; axon; dendrite; protein-DNA complex; endoplasmic reticulum; nucleus; plasma membrane |
| Biological process | regulation of transcription, DNA-templated; regulation of transcription by RNA polymerase II; regulation of ion transmembrane transport; negative regulation of transcription by RNA polymerase II; ion transport; transcription, DNA-templated; potassium ion transport; potassium ion transmembrane transport; protein localization to plasma membrane; intracellular protein transport; regulation of potassium ion transmembrane transport; signal transduction; apoptotic process; negative regulation of nucleic acid-templated transcription; cardiac conduction |
Sources:Amigo / QuickGO
Orthologs
| Databases | NCBI: entry |
| Species | Human | Mouse |
| Entrez | 30818 | 56461 |
| Ensembl | n/a | ENSMUSG00000079056 |
| UniProt | Q9Y2W7 | Q9QXT8; P0C092 |
| RefSeq (mRNA) | NM_001034914; NM_013434 | NM_001111331; NM_001291005; NM_019789 |
| RefSeq (protein) | NP_001030086; NP_038462 | NP_001104801; NP_001277934; NP_062763 |
| Location (UCSC) | n/a | Chr 2: 127.3 – 127.36 Mb |
| PubMed search |
- Wikidata
| View/Edit Human | View/Edit Mouse |

Calsenilin is a protein that in humans is encoded by the KCNIP3 gene.

== Function ==
This gene encodes a member of the family of voltage-gated potassium (Kv) channel-interacting proteins, which belong to the neuronal calcium sensor family of proteins. Members of this family are small calcium binding proteins containing EF-hand-like domains. They are integral subunit components of native Kv4 channel complexes that may regulate A-type currents, and hence neuronal excitability, in response to changes in intracellular calcium. The encoded protein also functions as a calcium-regulated transcriptional repressor, and interacts with presenilins. In addition, the protein has been shown to transcriptionally repress A20 (TNFAIP3) expression and thus modulate the anti-inflammatory signaling. Alternatively spliced transcript variants encoding different isoforms have been described.

== Interactions ==
Calsenilin has been shown to interact with PSEN1 and PSEN2.

== See also ==
- Voltage-gated potassium channel
