= TNIP1 =

Protein-coding gene in the species Homo sapiens

Identifiers
- Aliases: TNIP1, ABIN-1, NAF1, VAN, nip40-1, TNFAIP3 interacting protein 1
- External IDs: OMIM: 607714; MGI: 1926194; GeneCards: TNIP1

Gene location (Human)
Chr.	Chromosome 5 (human)
Band	5q33.1	Start	151,029,945 bp
Band	5q33.1	End	151,093,577 bp

Gene location (Mouse)
Chr.	Chromosome 11 (mouse)
Band	11|11 B1.3	Start	54,801,611 bp
Band	11|11 B1.3	End	54,853,743 bp
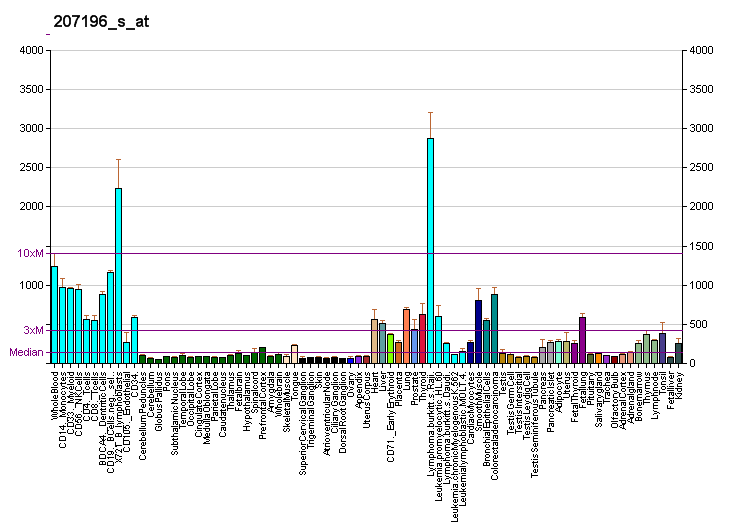
RNA expression pattern
Bgee	Human / Mouse (ortholog); Top expressed in: blood; muscle of thigh; epithelium of colon; apex of heart; gastrocnemius muscle; glutes; bone marrow cell; granulocyte; cartilage tissue; spleen / Top expressed in: decidua; left colon; temporal muscle; granulocyte; triceps brachii muscle; muscle of thigh; mesenteric lymph nodes; sternocleidomastoid muscle; jejunum; pyloric antrum; More reference expression data
BioGPS	More reference expression data
Gene ontology
Molecular function	protein binding; mitogen-activated protein kinase binding; identical protein binding; polyubiquitin modification-dependent protein binding
Cellular component	intracellular anatomical structure; nucleoplasm; nucleus; cytosol; cytoplasm
Biological process	leukocyte cell-cell adhesion; defense response; glycoprotein biosynthetic process; negative regulation of viral genome replication; modulation by symbiont of host I-kappaB kinase/NF-kappaB cascade; positive regulation of inflammatory response; inflammatory response; protein biosynthesis; negative regulation of ERK1 and ERK2 cascade; MyD88-dependent toll-like receptor signaling pathway; regulation of inflammatory response; negative regulation of I-kappaB kinase/NF-kappaB signaling; protein deubiquitination; positive regulation of transcription by RNA polymerase II; cellular response to lipopolysaccharide; positive regulation of protein deubiquitination
Sources:Amigo / QuickGO
Orthologs
Databases	NCBI: entry; OMA: entry
Species	Human	Mouse
Entrez	10318	57783
Ensembl	ENSG00000145901	ENSMUSG00000020400
UniProt	Q15025	Q9WUU8
RefSeq (mRNA)	NM_001252385; NM_001252386; NM_001252390; NM_001252391; NM_001252392 NM_001252393; NM_001258454; NM_001258455; NM_001258456; NM_006058; NM_001364486; NM_001364487	NM_001199275; NM_001199276; NM_001271455; NM_001271456; NM_021327
RefSeq (protein)	NP_001239314; NP_001239315; NP_001239319; NP_001239320; NP_001239321 NP_001239322; NP_001245383; NP_001245384; NP_001245385; NP_006049; NP_001351415; NP_001351416	NP_001186204; NP_001186205; NP_001258384; NP_001258385; NP_067302
Location (UCSC)	Chr 5: 151.03 – 151.09 Mb	Chr 11: 54.8 – 54.85 Mb
PubMed search
- Wikidata
View/Edit Human	View/Edit Mouse

TNFAIP3-interacting protein 1, also known as ABIN-1, is a protein that in humans is encoded by the TNIP1 gene.

== Association with autoimmune diseases ==
Genetic variations within the region of the TNIP1 gene have been shown to have association with several autoimmune diseases:

- Systemic Sclerosis;
- Psoriasis;
- Psoriatic arthritis;
- Systemic Lupus Erythematosus
- Type-1 autoimmune hepatitis
- Lupus nephritis

TNIP1 dysfunction or deficiency contributes to hyperinflammarion and may predispose healthy cells to the inflammatory response to otherwise innocuous TLR ligand exposure.

== Association with neurodegenerative diseases ==
A recent genome-wide association study (GWAS) has found that genetic variations in TNIP1 are associated with late-onset sporadic Alzheimer's disease (LOAD).

== Interactions ==
TNIP1 contains multiple amino acid sites that are phosphorylated and ubiquitinated, and has been shown to interact with TNFAIP3, MAP3K1, and MAPK1.

== Regulation ==
TNIP1 was shown to be part of a transcription module controlled by BCL3. BCL3 gen was found to be strongly associated with Aβ42 after conditioning for APOE and was found as upregulated in the brain of patients with LOAD.
