= TAB3 =

Protein-coding gene in humans

Identifiers
- Aliases: TAB3, MAP3K7IP3, NAP1, TGF-beta activated kinase 1/MAP3K7 binding protein 3, TGF-beta activated kinase 1 and MAP3K7 binding protein 3, TGF-beta activated kinase 1 (MAP3K7) binding protein 3
- External IDs: OMIM: 300480; MGI: 1913974; GeneCards: TAB3

Gene location (Human)
Chr.	X chromosome (human)
Band	Xp21.2	Start	30,827,442 bp
Band	Xp21.2	End	30,975,084 bp

Gene location (Mouse)
Chr.	X chromosome (mouse)
Band	X|X C1	Start	85,574,022 bp
Band	X|X C1	End	85,634,469 bp
RNA expression pattern
Bgee	Human / Mouse (ortholog); Top expressed in: pancreatic epithelial cell; pancreatic ductal cell; germinal epithelium; amniotic fluid; epithelium of nasopharynx; buccal mucosa cell; gingival epithelium; tail of epididymis; palpebral conjunctiva; visceral pleura / Top expressed in: retinal pigment epithelium; ureter; facial motor nucleus; primitive streak; medullary collecting duct; blood; hair follicle; Paneth cell; fetal liver hematopoietic progenitor cell; sexually immature organism; More reference expression data
BioGPS	n/a
Gene ontology
Molecular function	metal ion binding; protein binding
Cellular component	cytosol; plasma membrane; endosome membrane; extracellular exosome
Biological process	stimulatory C-type lectin receptor signaling pathway; MyD88-dependent toll-like receptor signaling pathway; Fc-epsilon receptor signaling pathway; JNK cascade; positive regulation of NF-kappaB transcription factor activity; I-kappaB kinase/NF-kappaB signaling; negative regulation of autophagy; nucleotide-binding oligomerization domain containing signaling pathway; MyD88-independent toll-like receptor signaling pathway; positive regulation of I-kappaB kinase/NF-kappaB signaling; interleukin-1-mediated signaling pathway
Sources:Amigo / QuickGO
Orthologs
Databases	NCBI: entry; OMA: entry
Species	Human	Mouse
Entrez	257397	66724
Ensembl	ENSG00000157625	ENSMUSG00000035476
UniProt	Q8N5C8	Q571K4
RefSeq (mRNA)	NM_152787; NM_198312; NM_001399870; NM_001399872; NM_001399873	NM_025729; NM_001358447
RefSeq (protein)	NP_690000	NP_080005; NP_001345376
Location (UCSC)	Chr X: 30.83 – 30.98 Mb	Chr X: 85.57 – 85.63 Mb
PubMed search
- Wikidata
View/Edit Human	View/Edit Mouse

TGF-beta-activated kinase 1 and MAP3K7-binding protein 3 is an enzyme that in humans is encoded by the TAB3 gene (previously MAP3K7IP3).

== Function ==
The product of this gene functions in the NF-kappaB signal transduction pathway. The encoded protein, and the similar and functionally redundant protein MAP3K7IP2/TAB2, forms a ternary complex with the protein kinase MAP3K7/TAK1 and either TRAF2 or TRAF6 in response to stimulation with the pro-inflammatory cytokines TNF or IL-1. Subsequent MAP3K7/TAK1 kinase activity triggers a signaling cascade leading to activation of the NF-kappaB transcription factor. The human genome contains a related pseudogene. Alternatively spliced transcript variants have been described, but their biological validity has not been determined.

== Interactions ==
MAP3K7IP3 has been shown to interact with MAP3K7IP2, TAB1 and MAP3K7.
