= MAP3K7 =

Protein-coding gene in the species Homo sapiens

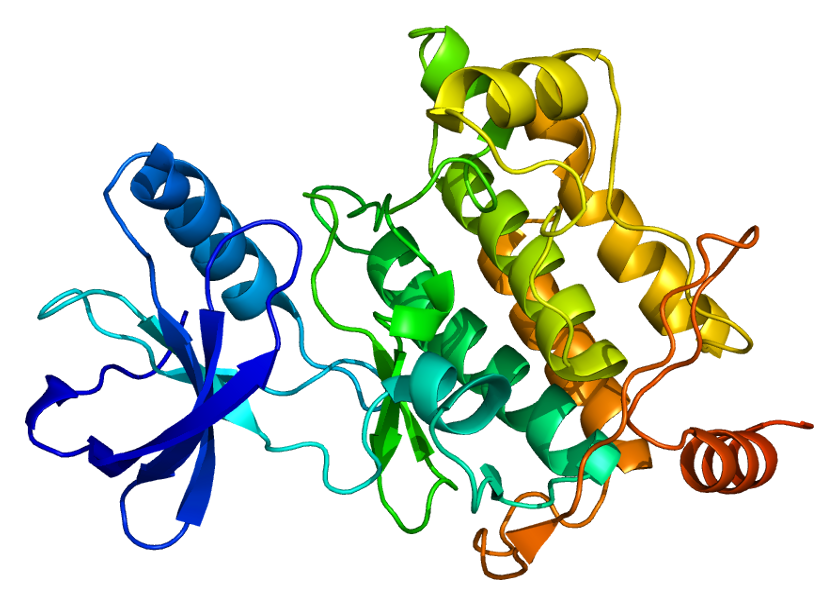

Identifiers
- Aliases: MAP3K7, MEKK7, TAK1, TGF1a, mitogen-activated protein kinase kinase kinase 7, FMD2, CSCF
- External IDs: OMIM: 602614; MGI: 1346877; GeneCards: MAP3K7
Available structures
PDB	Ortholog search: PDBe RCSB
PDB	List of PDB id codes 2EVA, 2YIY, 4GS6, 4L3P, 4L52, 4L53, 4O91, 5JGD, 5JGA
Enzyme activity
EC #	BRENDA	ExPASy	KEGG	MetaCyc
2.7.11.25	↗	↗	↗	↗

Gene location (Human)
Chr.	Chromosome 6 (human)
Band	6q15	Start	90,513,573 bp
Band	6q15	End	90,587,072 bp

Gene location (Mouse)
Chr.	Chromosome 4 (mouse)
Band	4|4 A5	Start	31,964,097 bp
Band	4|4 A5	End	32,023,467 bp
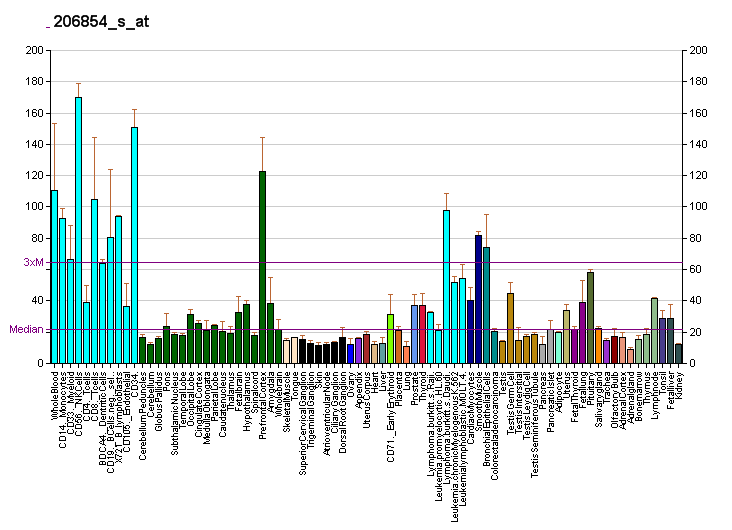

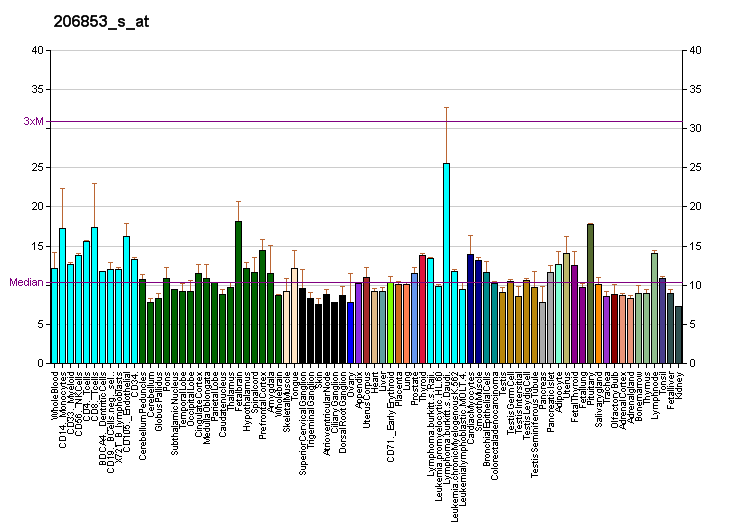

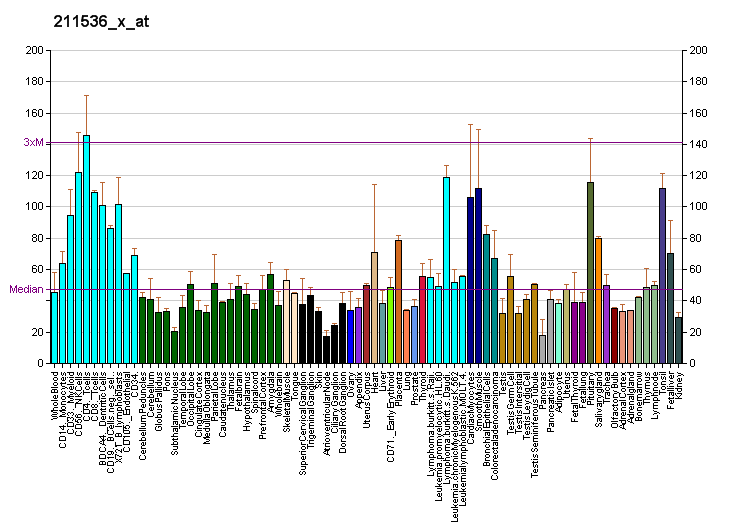
RNA expression pattern
Bgee	Human / Mouse (ortholog); Top expressed in: tendon of biceps brachii; corpus epididymis; internal globus pallidus; stromal cell of endometrium; tail of epididymis; caput epididymis; ganglionic eminence; corpus callosum; Brodmann area 23; Achilles tendon / Top expressed in: genital tubercle; tail of embryo; Paneth cell; molar; aortic valve; ventricular zone; maxillary prominence; somite; vastus lateralis muscle; mandibular prominence; More reference expression data
BioGPS	More reference expression data
Gene ontology
Molecular function	transferase activity; protein kinase activity; nucleotide binding; scaffold protein binding; metal ion binding; kinase activity; protein serine/threonine kinase activity; protein binding; ATP binding; magnesium ion binding; MAP kinase kinase kinase activity; identical protein binding; receptor tyrosine kinase binding
Cellular component	cytosol; membrane; plasma membrane; endosome membrane; nucleus; IkappaB kinase complex; cytoplasm
Biological process	regulation of transcription, DNA-templated; phosphorylation; positive regulation of JUN kinase activity; stimulatory C-type lectin receptor signaling pathway; activation of NF-kappaB-inducing kinase activity; I-kappaB phosphorylation; MyD88-dependent toll-like receptor signaling pathway; transcription, DNA-templated; Fc-epsilon receptor signaling pathway; protein phosphorylation; JNK cascade; positive regulation of T cell activation; positive regulation of NF-kappaB transcription factor activity; positive regulation of interleukin-2 production; positive regulation of T cell cytokine production; histone H3 acetylation; positive regulation of I-kappaB kinase/NF-kappaB signaling; I-kappaB kinase/NF-kappaB signaling; transforming growth factor beta receptor signaling pathway; T cell receptor signaling pathway; nucleotide-binding oligomerization domain containing signaling pathway; signal transduction; apoptotic process; Wnt signaling pathway, calcium modulating pathway; stress-activated MAPK cascade; positive regulation of macroautophagy; protein deubiquitination; anoikis; MyD88-independent toll-like receptor signaling pathway; viral process; interleukin-1-mediated signaling pathway
Sources:Amigo / QuickGO
Orthologs
Databases	NCBI: entry; OMA: entry
Species	Human	Mouse
Entrez	6885	26409
Ensembl	ENSG00000135341	ENSMUSG00000028284
UniProt	O43318	Q62073
RefSeq (mRNA)	NM_003188; NM_145331; NM_145332; NM_145333	NM_009316; NM_172688
RefSeq (protein)	NP_003179; NP_663304; NP_663305; NP_663306	NP_033342; NP_766276
Location (UCSC)	Chr 6: 90.51 – 90.59 Mb	Chr 4: 31.96 – 32.02 Mb
PubMed search
- Wikidata
View/Edit Human	View/Edit Mouse

Mitogen-activated protein kinase kinase kinase 7 (MAP3K7), also known as TAK1, is an enzyme that in humans is encoded by the MAP3K7 gene.

== Structure ==
TAK1 is an evolutionarily conserved kinase in the MAP3 K family and clusters with the tyrosine-like and sterile kinase families. The protein structure of TAK1 contains an N (residues 1–104)- and C (residues 111–303)-terminus connected through the hinge region (Met 104-Ser 111). The ATP binding pocket is located in the hinge region of the kinase. Additionally, TAK1 has a catalytic lysine (Lys63) in the active site. Crystal structure of TAK1-ATP have shown that ATP forms two hydrogen bonds with residues Ala 107 and Glu 105. Further hydrogen bonding is observed to Asp 175, which is the leading residue of the DFG motif. This residue is thought to interact with Lys 63 through polar interactions and is catalytically important for phosphate transfer to substrate molecules. Critical for the TAK1-TAB1 complex is a helical loop around Phe 484, which provides extensive surface contact between the two proteins.

== Signaling ==
The protein encoded by this gene is a member of the serine/threonine protein kinase family. This kinase mediates signal transduction induced by TGF beta and morphogenetic protein (BMP), and controls a variety of cell functions including transcription regulation and apoptosis. TAK1 is a central regulator of cell death and is activated through a diverse set of intra- and extracellular stimuli. TAK1 regulates cell survival not solely through NF-κB but also through NF-κB-independent pathways such as oxidative stress and receptor-interacting protein kinase 1 (RIPK1) kinase activity-dependent pathway. In response to IL-1, this protein forms a kinase complex including TRAF6, MAP3K7P1/TAB1 and MAP3K7P2/TAB2; this complex is required for the activation of nuclear factor kappa B. This kinase can also activate MAPK8/JNK, MAP2K4/MKK4, and thus plays a role in the cell response to environmental stresses. Four alternatively spliced transcript variants encoding distinct isoforms have been reported.]

In addition to IL-1 agonist activation, TAK1has been shown to be activated following TNF, TGFB, and LPS stimulation leading to the activation of pro-inflammatory pathways. Following TNF stimulation, TAK1 forms a ternary structure with TAB1 and TAB2/3 to form a fully activated TAK1 kinase. Following activation, TAK1 phosphorylates downstream effectors such as NF-κB, p38 and cJUN leading the up-regulation of pro inflammatory pro survival genes.

== Role in autoimmune diseases ==
This kinase has also been shown to regulate downstream cytokine expression such as TNF. Due to its regulation of TNF, TAK1 has become a novel target for the treatment of TNF mediated diseases such as auto immune disease ( Rheumatoid Arthritis, lupus, IBD) but also other cytokine mediated disorders such as chronic pain and cancer. With the advent of novel selective TAK1 inhibitors, groups have explored the therapeutic potential of TAK1 targeted therapies. One group has shown that the selective TAK1 inhibitor, Takinib developed at Duke University attenuated rheumatoid arthritis like pathology in the CIA mouse model of human inflammatory arthritis. Furthermore, pharmacological inhibition of TAK1 has shown to reduce inflammatory cytokines in particular TNF.

== Humans mutations ==
A rare mutation in TAK1 in humans has been reported. The mutation leads to gain of function, and hyper activation of TAK1 signaling pathways. Patients with gain of function mutations often present with craniofacial abnormalities.

== Interactions ==
MAP3K7 has been shown to interact with:

- ASK1,
- CHUK,
- MAP2K6,
- TAB1,
- MAP3K7IP2,
- MAP3K7IP3,
- Mothers against decapentaplegic homolog 6,
- PPM1B, and
- TRAF6.
