= TAB2 =

Protein-coding gene in the species Homo sapiens

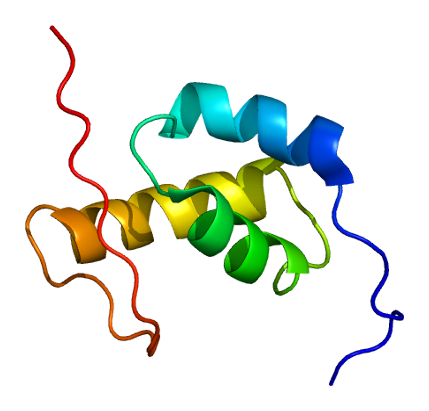

Identifiers
- Aliases: TAB2, CHTD2, MAP3K7IP2, TAB-2, TGF-beta activated kinase 1/MAP3K7 binding protein 2, TGF-beta activated kinase 1 (MAP3K7) binding protein 2
- External IDs: OMIM: 605101; MGI: 1915902; GeneCards: TAB2
Available structures
PDB	Ortholog search: PDBe RCSB
PDB	List of PDB id codes 2DAE, 2WWZ, 2WX0, 2WX1

Gene location (Human)
Chr.	Chromosome 6 (human)
Band	6q25.1	Start	149,218,641 bp
Band	6q25.1	End	149,411,613 bp

Gene location (Mouse)
Chr.	Chromosome 10 (mouse)
Band	10|10 A1	Start	7,905,653 bp
Band	10|10 A1	End	7,956,230 bp
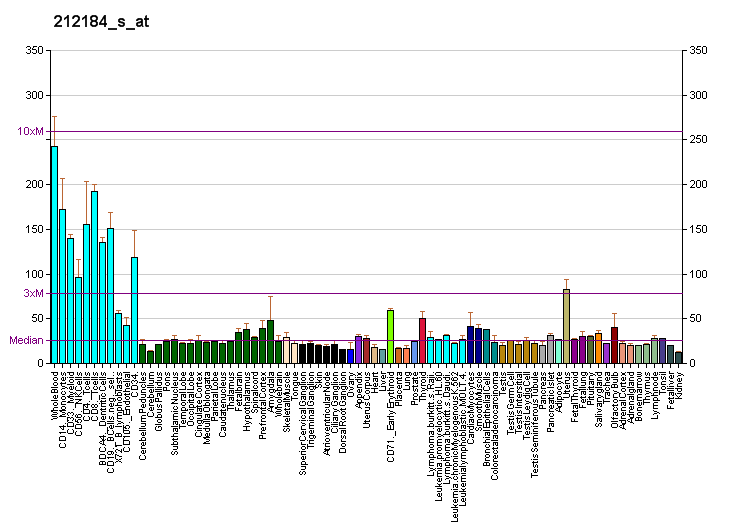

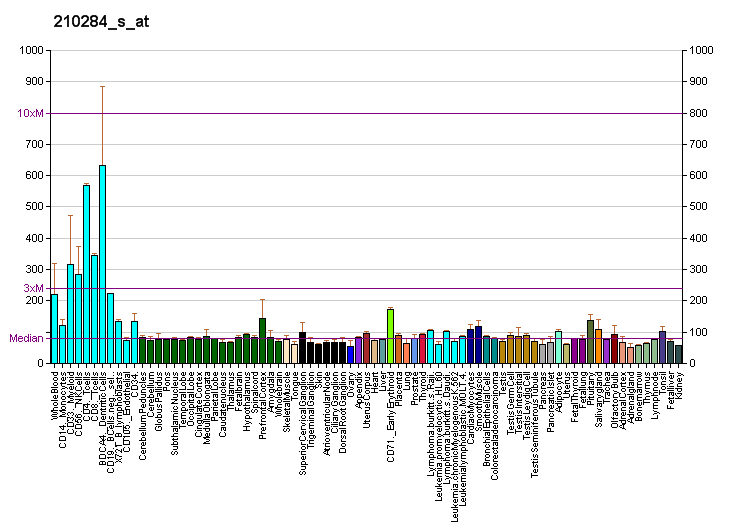
RNA expression pattern
Bgee	Human / Mouse (ortholog); Top expressed in: parotid gland; ventricular zone; epithelium of colon; gastrocnemius muscle; cartilage tissue; hair follicle; islet of Langerhans; monocyte; muscle layer of sigmoid colon; biceps brachii / Top expressed in: plantaris muscle; extensor digitorum longus muscle; parotid gland; genital tubercle; left lung lobe; sciatic nerve; aortic valve; abdominal wall; mesenteric lymph nodes; migratory enteric neural crest cell; More reference expression data
BioGPS	More reference expression data
Gene ontology
Molecular function	metal ion binding; K63-linked polyubiquitin modification-dependent protein binding; protein binding
Cellular component	endosome membrane; cytoplasm; membrane; plasma membrane; cytosol; nucleoplasm
Biological process	JNK cascade; positive regulation of NF-kappaB transcription factor activity; positive regulation of protein kinase activity; Fc-epsilon receptor signaling pathway; development of the heart; nucleotide-binding oligomerization domain containing signaling pathway; MyD88-dependent toll-like receptor signaling pathway; stimulatory C-type lectin receptor signaling pathway; I-kappaB kinase/NF-kappaB signaling; negative regulation of autophagy; positive regulation of I-kappaB kinase/NF-kappaB signaling; T cell receptor signaling pathway; interleukin-1-mediated signaling pathway; response to lipopolysaccharide
Sources:Amigo / QuickGO
Orthologs
Databases	NCBI: entry; OMA: entry
Species	Human	Mouse
Entrez	23118	68652
Ensembl	ENSG00000055208	ENSMUSG00000015755
UniProt	Q9NYJ8	Q99K90
RefSeq (mRNA)	NM_001292034; NM_001292035; NM_015093; NM_145342; NM_001369506	NM_138667; NM_001359534
RefSeq (protein)	NP_001278963; NP_001278964; NP_055908; NP_001356435	NP_619608; NP_001346463
Location (UCSC)	Chr 6: 149.22 – 149.41 Mb	Chr 10: 7.91 – 7.96 Mb
PubMed search
- Wikidata
View/Edit Human	View/Edit Mouse

TGF-beta-activated kinase 1 and MAP3K7-binding protein 2 is an enzyme that in humans is encoded by TAB2 gene (previously MAP3K7IP2).

The protein encoded by this gene is an activator of MAP3K7/TAK1, which is required for the IL-1 induced activation of nuclear factor kappaB and MAPK8/JNK. This protein forms a kinase complex with TRAF6, MAP3K7 and TAB1, thus serves as an adaptor linking MAP3K7 and TRAF6. This protein, TAB1, and MAP3K7 also participate in the signal transduction induced by TNFSF11/RANKL through the activation of the receptor activator of NF-kappB (TNFRSF11A/RANK), which may regulate the development and function of osteoclasts. Mutations in MAP3K7IP2 have been associated with human congenital heart defects.

== Interactions ==
MAP3K7IP2 has been shown to interact with:

- HDAC3,
- TAB1,
- MAP3K7IP3,
- MAP3K7,
- NFKB1,
- NUMBL,
- Nuclear receptor co-repressor 1,
- TRAF2, and
- TRAF6.
