= TNFAIP3 =

Protein-coding gene in the species Homo sapiens

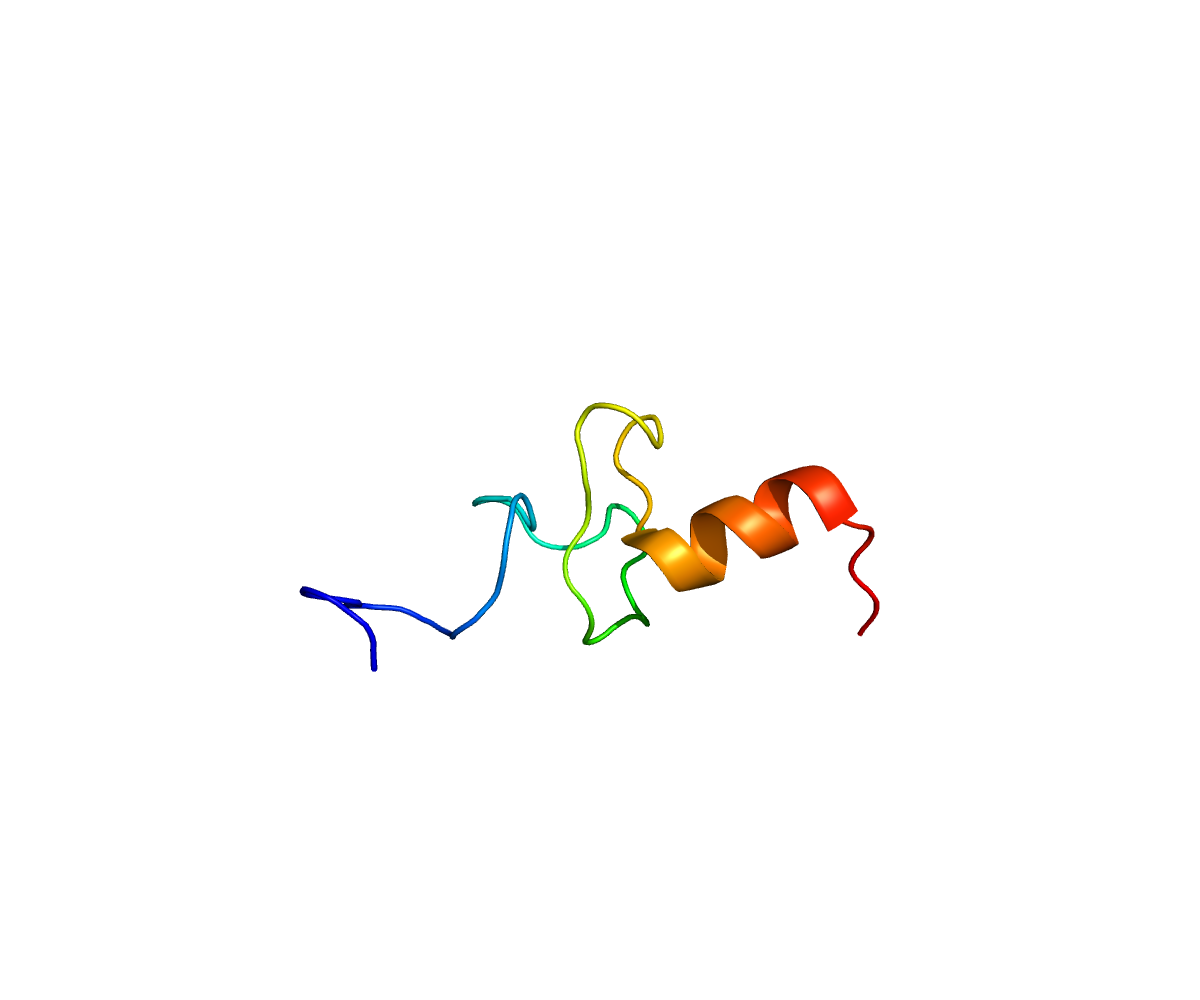

Identifiers
- Aliases: TNFAIP3, A20, OTUD7C, TNFA1P2, AISBL, TNF alpha induced protein 3, AIFBL1
- External IDs: OMIM: 191163; MGI: 1196377; GeneCards: TNFAIP3
Available structures
PDB	Ortholog search: PDBe RCSB
PDB	List of PDB id codes 2EQF, 2EQG, 2VFJ, 3DKB, 3OJ3, 3OJ4, 3VUW, 3VUX, 3VUY, 3ZJD, 3ZJE, 3ZJF, 3ZJG, 4ZRH, 4ZS5
Enzyme activity
EC #	BRENDA	ExPASy	KEGG	MetaCyc
3.4.19.12	↗	↗	↗	↗

Gene location (Human)
Chr.	Chromosome 6 (human)
Band	6q23.3	Start	137,867,214 bp
Band	6q23.3	End	137,883,312 bp

Gene location (Mouse)
Chr.	Chromosome 10 (mouse)
Band	10 A3|10 8.08 cM	Start	18,876,658 bp
Band	10 A3|10 8.08 cM	End	18,891,405 bp
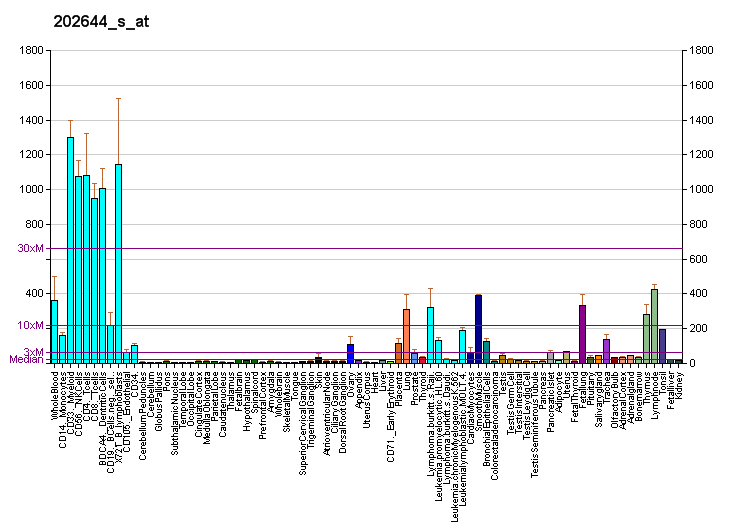

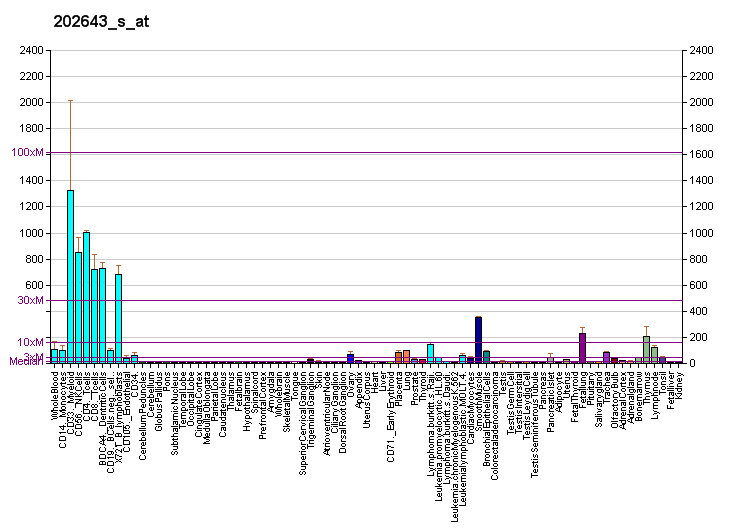
RNA expression pattern
Bgee	Human / Mouse (ortholog); Top expressed in: vena cava; mucosa of paranasal sinus; appendix; epithelium of nasopharynx; pericardium; mucosa of urinary bladder; skin of thigh; thymus; lymph node; cartilage tissue / Top expressed in: neural layer of retina; retinal pigment epithelium; mesenteric lymph nodes; thymus; epithelium of lens; granulocyte; Paneth cell; jejunum; left colon; stroma of bone marrow; More reference expression data
BioGPS	More reference expression data
Gene ontology
Molecular function	DNA binding; cysteine-type peptidase activity; zinc ion binding; metal ion binding; ubiquitin-protein transferase activity; protease binding; protein self-association; peptidase activity; ligase activity; kinase binding; K63-linked polyubiquitin modification-dependent protein binding; ubiquitin binding; protein binding; catalytic activity; thiol-dependent deubiquitinase; hydrolase activity; identical protein binding; Lys63-specific deubiquitinase activity; transferase activity
Cellular component	cytoplasm; cytosol; lysosome; extracellular exosome; nucleus; intracellular membrane-bounded organelle
Biological process	regulation of germinal center formation; positive regulation of hepatocyte proliferation; negative regulation of endothelial cell apoptotic process; negative regulation of interleukin-1 beta production; negative regulation of smooth muscle cell proliferation; regulation of vascular wound healing; B-1 B cell homeostasis; protein K48-linked deubiquitination; positive regulation of protein catabolic process; negative regulation of cyclin-dependent protein serine/threonine kinase activity; regulation of defense response to virus by host; protein deubiquitination involved in ubiquitin-dependent protein catabolic process; negative regulation of toll-like receptor 2 signaling pathway; negative regulation of nucleotide-binding oligomerization domain containing 2 signaling pathway; regulation of tumor necrosis factor-mediated signaling pathway; negative regulation of interleukin-6 production; negative regulation of B cell activation; negative regulation of toll-like receptor 5 signaling pathway; tolerance induction to lipopolysaccharide; response to muramyl dipeptide; negative regulation of chronic inflammatory response; negative regulation of cell death; negative regulation of I-kappaB kinase/NF-kappaB signaling; proteolysis; establishment of protein localization to vacuole; protein deubiquitination; negative regulation of protein ubiquitination; protein K48-linked ubiquitination; protein K63-linked deubiquitination; negative regulation of CD40 signaling pathway; negative regulation of extrinsic apoptotic signaling pathway via death domain receptors; protein complex oligomerization; protein K11-linked deubiquitination; regulation of inflammatory response; negative regulation of nucleotide-binding oligomerization domain containing 1 signaling pathway; negative regulation of innate immune response; negative regulation of osteoclast proliferation; negative regulation of tumor necrosis factor production; negative regulation of type I interferon production; metabolism; inflammatory response; response to molecule of bacterial origin; negative regulation of NF-kappaB transcription factor activity; negative regulation of interleukin-2 production; negative regulation of inflammatory response; negative regulation of toll-like receptor 3 signaling pathway; nucleotide-binding oligomerization domain containing signaling pathway; cellular response to lipopolysaccharide; negative regulation of toll-like receptor 4 signaling pathway; negative regulation of bone resorption; cellular response to hydrogen peroxide; apoptotic process; protein ubiquitination; cytoskeleton organization; cell migration; positive regulation of Wnt signaling pathway; protein K29-linked deubiquitination; protein K33-linked deubiquitination
Sources:Amigo / QuickGO
Orthologs
Databases	NCBI: entry; OMA: entry
Species	Human	Mouse
Entrez	7128	21929
Ensembl	ENSG00000118503	ENSMUSG00000019850
UniProt	P21580	Q60769
RefSeq (mRNA)	NM_001270507; NM_001270508; NM_006290	NM_001166402; NM_009397
RefSeq (protein)	NP_001257436; NP_001257437; NP_006281	NP_001159874; NP_033423
Location (UCSC)	Chr 6: 137.87 – 137.88 Mb	Chr 10: 18.88 – 18.89 Mb
PubMed search
- Wikidata
View/Edit Human	View/Edit Mouse

Tumor necrosis factor, alpha-induced protein 3 or A20 is a protein that in humans is encoded by the TNFAIP3 gene.

This gene was identified as a gene whose expression is rapidly induced by the tumor necrosis factor (TNF). The protein encoded by this gene is a zinc finger protein and a deubiquitinating enzyme, and has been shown to inhibit NF-kappa B activation as well as TNF-mediated apoptosis. The A20 protein is ancient, and protein homolog can be found as far back as cnidaria (corals, jellyfish, anemones) with a conserved protein domain composition. Using knockout mouse models of TNFAIP3 and its transcriptional repressor (i.e. KCHIP3), TNFAIP3 has been shown to be critical for limiting inflammation by terminating endotoxin- and TNF-induced NF-kappa B responses. In brief, deubiquitinase function of TNFAIP3 was shown to remove ubiquitin chains from VE-cadherin to prevent loss of VE-cadherin at the endothelial adherens junctions.

== Interactions ==
TNFAIP3 has been shown to interact with TNIP1, TRAF1, TRAF2, IKBKG, TAX1BP1, YWHAB, YWHAZ, TRAF6 and YWHAH.

== Association with rheumatoid arthritis ==
The TNFAIP3 locus is implicated as a positively associated factor in rheumatoid arthritis (RA). The rs5029937 (T) and the rs6920220 (A) SNPs increase risk of RA by 20 to 40% respectively. A third SNP, rs10499194 (T) is found less often in rheumatoid arthritis but this negative association may not be statistically meaningful.

=== Other diseases ===
An association with infantile onset intractable inflammatory bowel disease has also been reported.

== See also ==
- Haploinsufficiency of A20
