= TAX1BP1 =

Protein-coding gene in the species Homo sapiens

Identifiers
- Aliases: TAX1BP1, CALCOCO3, T6BP, TXBP151, Tax1 binding protein 1
- External IDs: OMIM: 605326; MGI: 1289308; GeneCards: TAX1BP1
Available structures
PDB	Ortholog search: PDBe RCSB
PDB	List of PDB id codes 2M7Q, 4BMJ, 4NLH, 5AAS, 4Z4M, 4Z4K

Gene location (Human)
Chr.	Chromosome 7 (human)
Band	7p15.2	Start	27,739,331 bp
Band	7p15.2	End	27,844,564 bp

Gene location (Mouse)
Chr.	Chromosome 6 (mouse)
Band	6 B3|6 25.7 cM	Start	52,690,714 bp
Band	6 B3|6 25.7 cM	End	52,743,765 bp
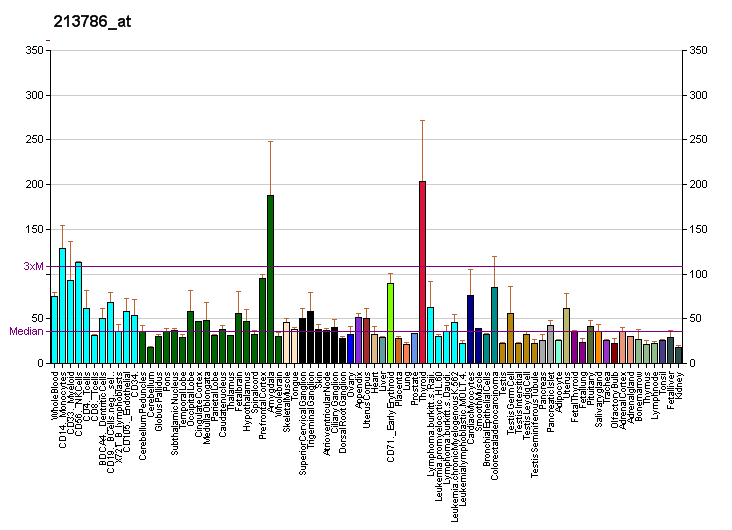

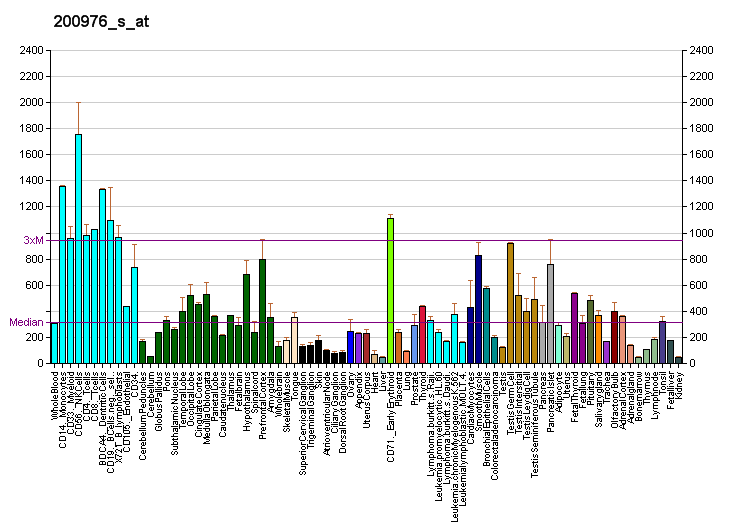

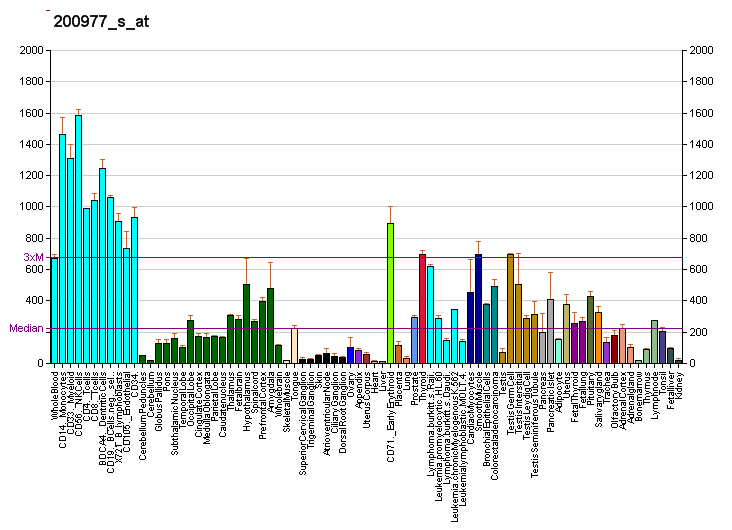
RNA expression pattern
Bgee	Human / Mouse (ortholog); Top expressed in: secondary oocyte; bronchial epithelial cell; retinal pigment epithelium; amniotic fluid; epithelium of nasopharynx; oral cavity; Epithelium of choroid plexus; mucosa of paranasal sinus; nasal epithelium; right ventricle / Top expressed in: Ileal epithelium; corneal stroma; olfactory epithelium; left colon; spermatid; lactiferous gland; tail of embryo; choroid plexus of fourth ventricle; zygote; seminal vesicula; More reference expression data
BioGPS	More reference expression data
Gene ontology
Molecular function	kinase binding; protein binding; metal ion binding
Cellular component	cytosol; extracellular exosome
Biological process	regulation of tumor necrosis factor-mediated signaling pathway; negative regulation of type I interferon production; negative regulation of apoptotic process; negative regulation of NF-kappaB transcription factor activity; apoptotic process
Sources:Amigo / QuickGO
Orthologs
Databases	NCBI: entry; OMA: entry
Species	Human	Mouse
Entrez	8887	52440
Ensembl	ENSG00000106052	ENSMUSG00000004535
UniProt	Q86VP1	Q3UKC1
RefSeq (mRNA)	NM_001079864; NM_001206901; NM_001206902; NM_006024; NM_001362794 NM_001362795	NM_025816; NM_001355595; NM_001355596
RefSeq (protein)	NP_001073333; NP_001193830; NP_001193831; NP_006015; NP_001349723 NP_001349724	NP_080092; NP_001342524; NP_001342525
Location (UCSC)	Chr 7: 27.74 – 27.84 Mb	Chr 6: 52.69 – 52.74 Mb
PubMed search
- Wikidata
View/Edit Human	View/Edit Mouse

Tax1-binding protein 1 is a protein that in humans is encoded by the TAX1BP1 gene.

== Interactions ==
TAX1BP1 has been shown to interact with TNFAIP3 and TRAF6. TAX1BP1 binds to TNFAIP3 or TRAF6 and suppresses NF-kappaB transcriptional activation.
