= TRAF6 =

Protein found in humans

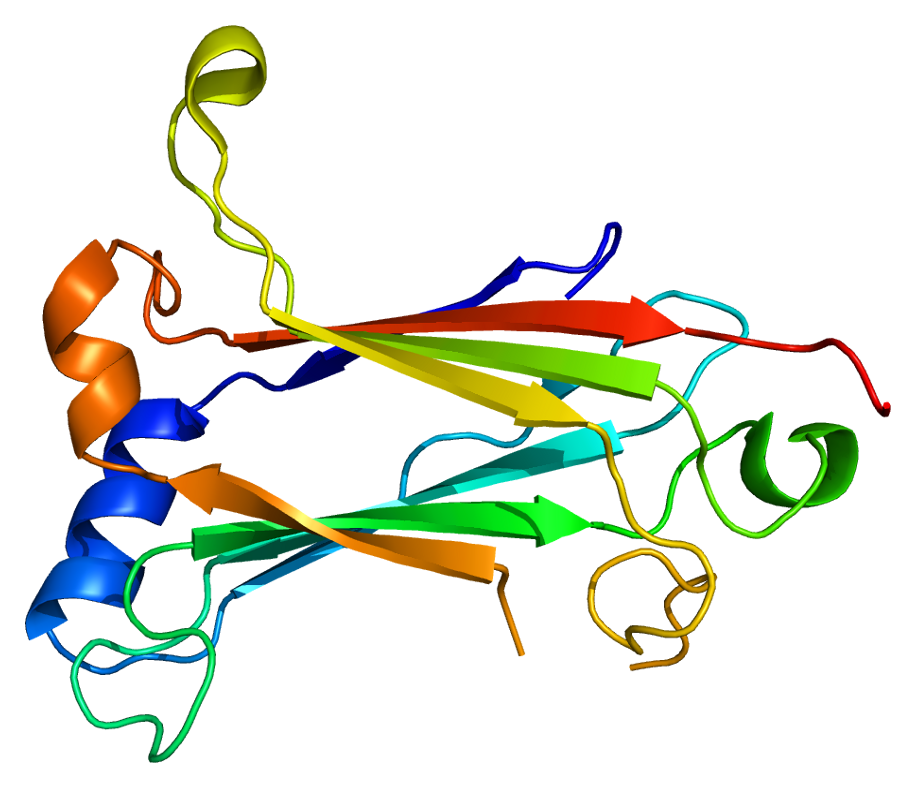

Identifiers
- Aliases: TRAF6, MGC:3310, RNF85, TNF receptor associated factor 6
- External IDs: OMIM: 602355; MGI: 108072; GeneCards: TRAF6
Available structures
PDB	Ortholog search: PDBe RCSB
PDB	List of PDB id codes 1LB4, 1LB5, 1LB6, 2ECI, 2JMD, 3HCS, 3HCT, 3HCU, 4Z8M
Enzyme activity
EC #	BRENDA	ExPASy	KEGG	MetaCyc
2.3.2.27	↗	↗	↗	↗

Gene location (Human)
Chr.	Chromosome 11 (human)
Band	11p12	Start	36,483,769 bp
Band	11p12	End	36,510,272 bp

Gene location (Mouse)
Chr.	Chromosome 2 (mouse)
Band	2|2 E2	Start	101,508,774 bp
Band	2|2 E2	End	101,532,014 bp
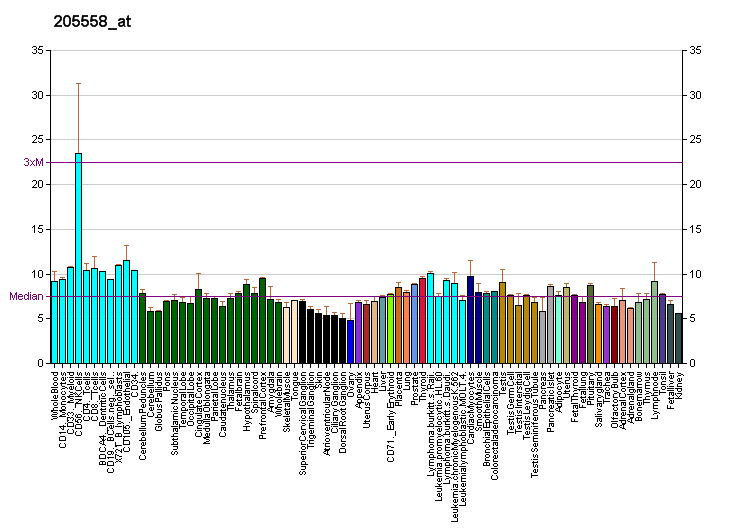
RNA expression pattern
Bgee	Human / Mouse (ortholog); Top expressed in: secondary oocyte; endothelial cell; gonad; islet of Langerhans; Achilles tendon; middle temporal gyrus; testicle; ascending aorta; monocyte; popliteal artery / Top expressed in: Ileal epithelium; genital tubercle; tail of embryo; lumbar subsegment of spinal cord; lumbar spinal ganglion; granulocyte; thymus; ventricular zone; condyle; fossa; More reference expression data
BioGPS	More reference expression data
Gene ontology
Molecular function	protein N-terminus binding; histone deacetylase binding; ubiquitin protein ligase activity; metal ion binding; mitogen-activated protein kinase kinase kinase binding; zinc ion binding; protein binding; thioesterase binding; ubiquitin conjugating enzyme binding; protein kinase binding; protein kinase B binding; ubiquitin-protein transferase activity; identical protein binding; ubiquitin protein ligase binding; transferase activity; tumor necrosis factor receptor binding
Cellular component	cytoplasm; cytosol; lipid droplet; perinuclear region of cytoplasm; cytoplasmic side of plasma membrane; nucleus; plasma membrane; cell cortex; endosome membrane; CD40 receptor complex; protein-containing complex
Biological process	positive regulation of transcription regulatory region DNA binding; response to interleukin-1; toll-like receptor signaling pathway; Fc-epsilon receptor signaling pathway; odontogenesis of dentin-containing tooth; animal organ morphogenesis; T-helper 1 type immune response; toll-like receptor 9 signaling pathway; regulation of apoptotic process; ossification; cytokine-mediated signaling pathway; osteoclast differentiation; positive regulation of osteoclast differentiation; stimulatory C-type lectin receptor signaling pathway; activation of NF-kappaB-inducing kinase activity; bone resorption; JNK cascade; membrane protein intracellular domain proteolysis; protein ubiquitination; positive regulation of T cell proliferation; I-kappaB kinase/NF-kappaB signaling; protein autoubiquitination; immune system process; positive regulation of JUN kinase activity; positive regulation of DNA-binding transcription factor activity; protein polyubiquitination; negative regulation of apoptotic process; negative regulation of transcription by RNA polymerase II; positive regulation of lipopolysaccharide-mediated signaling pathway; positive regulation of NF-kappaB transcription factor activity; positive regulation of interleukin-2 production; positive regulation of T cell cytokine production; immune response; negative regulation of transcription, DNA-templated; nucleotide-binding oligomerization domain containing signaling pathway; positive regulation of protein ubiquitination; positive regulation of smooth muscle cell proliferation; antigen processing and presentation of exogenous peptide antigen via MHC class II; cell development; protein K63-linked ubiquitination; myeloid dendritic cell differentiation; MyD88-dependent toll-like receptor signaling pathway; neural tube closure; bone remodeling; positive regulation of apoptotic process; positive regulation of I-kappaB kinase/NF-kappaB signaling; cellular response to lipopolysaccharide; T cell receptor signaling pathway; activation of protein kinase activity; positive regulation of transcription by RNA polymerase II; signal transduction; cellular response to DNA damage stimulus; protein deubiquitination; regulation of I-kappaB kinase/NF-kappaB signaling; interleukin-1-mediated signaling pathway; cellular response to cytokine stimulus; positive regulation of NIK/NF-kappaB signaling; positive regulation of leukocyte adhesion to vascular endothelial cell
Sources:Amigo / QuickGO
Orthologs
Databases	NCBI: entry; OMA: entry
Species	Human	Mouse
Entrez	7189	22034
Ensembl	ENSG00000175104	ENSMUSG00000027164
UniProt	Q9Y4K3	P70196
RefSeq (mRNA)	NM_145803; NM_004620	NM_009424; NM_001303273
RefSeq (protein)	NP_004611; NP_665802	NP_001290202; NP_033450
Location (UCSC)	Chr 11: 36.48 – 36.51 Mb	Chr 2: 101.51 – 101.53 Mb
PubMed search
- Wikidata
View/Edit Human	View/Edit Mouse

TRAF6 is a TRAF human protein.

== Function ==
The protein encoded by this gene is a member of the TNF receptor associated factor (TRAF) protein family. TRAF proteins are associated with, and mediate signal transduction from members of the TNF receptor superfamily. This protein mediates the signaling not only from the members of the TNF receptor superfamily, but also from the members of the Toll/IL-1 family. Signals from receptors such as CD40, TNFSF11 (TRANCE/RANKL) and IL-1 have been shown to be mediated by this protein. This protein also interacts with various protein kinases including IRAK1/IRAK, SRC and PKCzeta, which provides a link between distinct signaling pathways. This protein functions as a signal transducer in the NF-kappaB pathway that activates IkappaB kinase (IKK) in response to proinflammatory cytokines. The interaction of this protein with UBE2N (UBC13), and UBE2V1 (UEV1A), which are ubiquitin-conjugating enzymes catalyzing the formation of polyubiquitin chains, has been found to be required for IKK activation by this protein. Two alternatively spliced transcript variants encoding identical proteins have been reported.

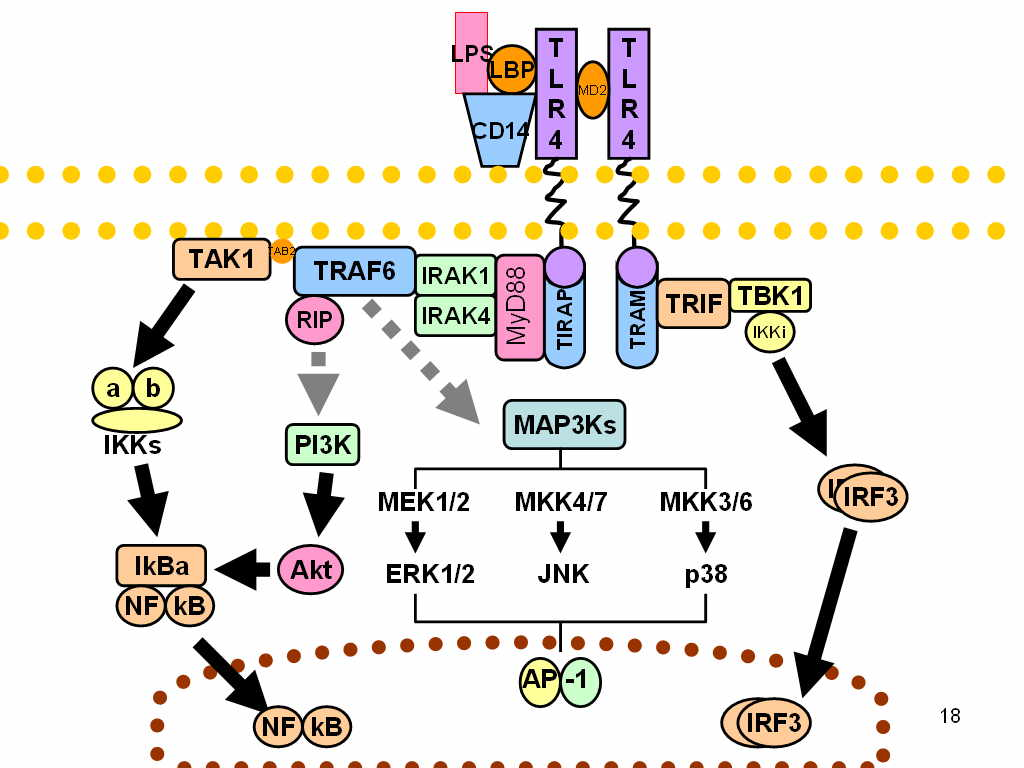
Signaling pathway of toll-like receptors. Dashed grey lines represent unknown associations

== Interactions ==
TRAF6 has been shown to interact with:

- ASK1,
- CD40,
- FHL2,
- HSPB2,
- IKBKG,
- IRAK1,
- IRAK2,
- TAB1,
- MAP3K7IP2,
- MAP3K7
- PPP4C,
- RANK,
- SDCBP,
- SIGIRR,
- Sequestosome 1,
- TAX1BP1,
- TNFAIP3,
- TNFRSF13B,
- UBE2N, and
- Ubiquitin C.
