= TAB1 =

Protein-coding gene in the species Homo sapiens

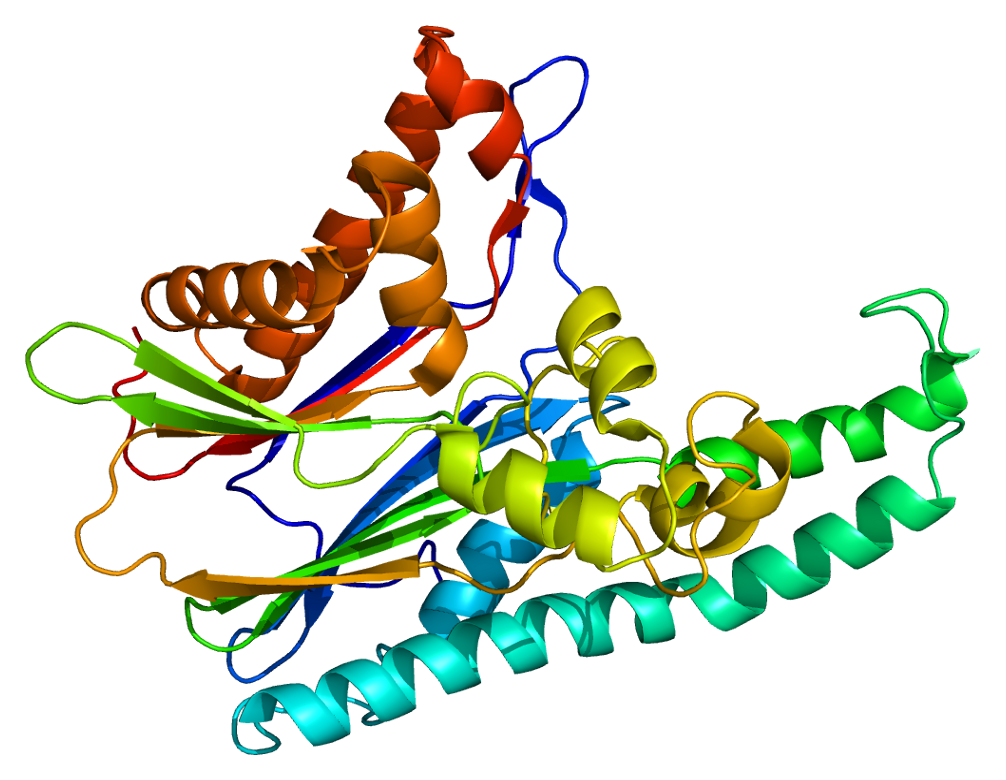
Available structures
PDB	Ortholog search: PDBe RCSB
PDB	List of PDB id codes 2J4O, 2POM, 2POP, 2YDS, 2YIY, 4AY5, 4AY6, 4GS6, 4KA3, 4L3P, 4L53, 4O91, 5DIY, 5JGA, 5JGD

Identifiers
- Aliases: TAB1, 3'-Tab1, MAP3K7IP1, TGF-beta activated kinase 1/MAP3K7 binding protein 1, TGF-beta activated kinase 1 (MAP3K7) binding protein 1
- External IDs: OMIM: 602615; MGI: 1913763; HomoloGene: 4461; GeneCards: TAB1; OMA:TAB1 - orthologs

Gene location (Human)
Chr.	Chromosome 22 (human)
Band	22q13.1	Start	39,399,778 bp
Band	22q13.1	End	39,437,060 bp

Gene location (Mouse)
Chr.	Chromosome 15 (mouse)
Band	15|15 E1	Start	80,017,328 bp
Band	15|15 E1	End	80,045,908 bp
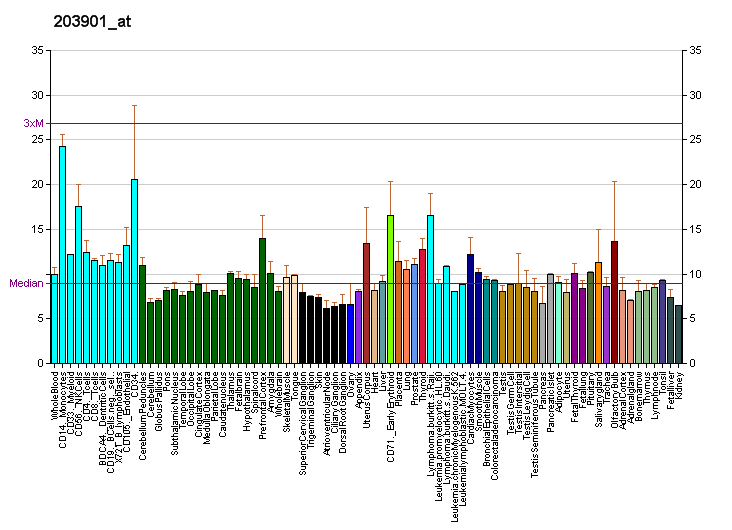
RNA expression pattern
Bgee	Human / Mouse (ortholog); Top expressed in: parotid gland; lateral nuclear group of thalamus; ventricular zone; right hemisphere of cerebellum; sural nerve; apex of heart; Skeletal muscle tissue of rectus abdominis; right frontal lobe; subthalamic nucleus; right ventricle / Top expressed in: otic vesicle; ventricular zone; neural layer of retina; internal carotid artery; external carotid artery; granulocyte; saccule; muscle of thigh; right kidney; lip; More reference expression data
BioGPS	More reference expression data
Gene ontology
Molecular function	protein serine/threonine phosphatase activity; protein binding; catalytic activity; kinase activator activity; enzyme activator activity; protein-containing complex binding; mitogen-activated protein kinase p38 binding; protein kinase activator activity
Cellular component	endosome membrane; cytosol; nuclear speck; protein-containing complex; nucleus
Biological process	cardiac septum development; lung development; protein dephosphorylation; heart morphogenesis; stimulatory C-type lectin receptor signaling pathway; in utero embryonic development; MyD88-dependent toll-like receptor signaling pathway; coronary vasculature development; Fc-epsilon receptor signaling pathway; JNK cascade; aorta development; positive regulation of NF-kappaB transcription factor activity; I-kappaB kinase/NF-kappaB signaling; transforming growth factor beta receptor signaling pathway; nucleotide-binding oligomerization domain containing signaling pathway; positive regulation of MAP kinase activity; protein deubiquitination; interleukin-1-mediated signaling pathway
Sources:Amigo / QuickGO
Orthologs
Species	Human	Mouse
Entrez	10454	66513
Ensembl	ENSG00000100324	ENSMUSG00000022414
UniProt	Q15750	Q8CF89
RefSeq (mRNA)	NM_153497; NM_006116	NM_025609
RefSeq (protein)	NP_006107; NP_705717	NP_079885
Location (UCSC)	Chr 22: 39.4 – 39.44 Mb	Chr 15: 80.02 – 80.05 Mb
PubMed search
- Wikidata
View/Edit Human	View/Edit Mouse

Mitogen-activated protein kinase kinase kinase 7-interacting protein 1 is an enzyme that in humans is encoded by the TAB1 gene.

== Function ==
The protein encoded by this gene was identified as a regulator of the MAP kinase kinase kinase MAP3K7/TAK1, which is known to mediate various intracellular signaling pathways, such as those induced by TGF-beta, interleukin-1, and WNT-1. This protein interacts and thus activates TAK1 kinase. It has been shown that the C-terminal portion of this protein is sufficient for binding and activation of TAK1, while a portion of the N-terminus acts as a dominant-negative inhibitor of TGF beta, suggesting that this protein may function as a mediator between TGF beta receptors and TAK1. This protein can also interact with and activate the mitogen-activated protein kinase 14 (MAPK14/p38alpha), and thus represents an alternative activation pathway, in addition to the MAPKK pathways, which contributes to the biological responses of MAPK14 to various stimuli. Alternatively spliced transcript variants encoding distinct isoforms have been reported. TAB1 contains multiple amino acid sites that are phosphorylated and ubiquitinated.

This protein plays an important role in skin homeostasis, wound repair, and oncogenesis.

== Interactions ==
TAB1 has been shown to interact with:

- MAP3K7IP2,
- MAP3K7IP3,
- MAP3K7,
- MAP3K1,
- MAPK14,
- Mothers against decapentaplegic homolog 7,
- TRAF6,
- XIAP, and
- ZMYND11.
