= 40S ribosomal protein S4, X isoform =

Protein-coding gene in the species Homo sapiens

RPS4X

Identifiers
- Aliases: RPS4X, CCG2, DXS306, RPS4, S4, SCAR, SCR10, ribosomal protein S4, X-linked, ribosomal protein S4 X-linked
- External IDs: OMIM: 312760; MGI: 98158; GeneCards: RPS4X
Available structures
PDB	Ortholog search: PDBe RCSB
PDB	List of PDB id codes 4UG0, 4V6X, 5A2Q, 3J7R, 3J7P

Gene location (Human)
Chr.	X chromosome (human)
Band	Xq13.1	Start	72,255,679 bp
Band	Xq13.1	End	72,277,248 bp

Gene location (Mouse)
Chr.	X chromosome (mouse)
Band	X D|X 45.2 cM	Start	101,228,547 bp
Band	X D|X 45.2 cM	End	101,233,000 bp
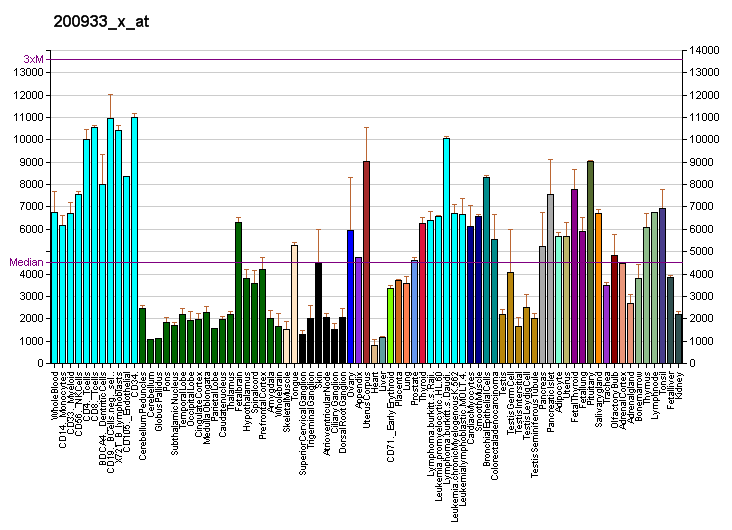

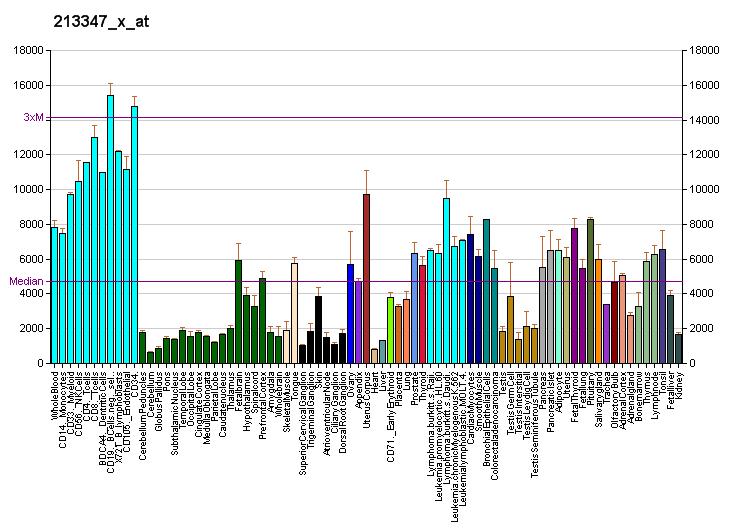
RNA expression pattern
Bgee	Human / Mouse (ortholog); Top expressed in: germinal epithelium; lactiferous duct; tibia; visceral pleura; parietal pleura; corpus epididymis; vulva; epithelium of nasopharynx; mucosa of paranasal sinus; superficial temporal artery / Top expressed in: epiblast; ventricular zone; ganglionic eminence; uterus; zone of skin; spleen; esophagus; thymus; embryo; urinary bladder; More reference expression data
BioGPS	More reference expression data
Gene ontology
Molecular function	rRNA binding; structural constituent of ribosome; protein binding; RNA binding
Cellular component	cytoplasm; polysome; cytosol; ribosome; membrane; focal adhesion; intracellular anatomical structure; cytosolic small ribosomal subunit; small ribosomal subunit; cytoplasmic ribonucleoprotein granule; extracellular exosome; extracellular matrix; nucleoplasm; ribonucleoprotein complex; synapse
Biological process	viral transcription; positive regulation of translation; SRP-dependent cotranslational protein targeting to membrane; multicellular organism development; positive regulation of cell population proliferation; translational initiation; nuclear-transcribed mRNA catabolic process, nonsense-mediated decay; rRNA processing; protein biosynthesis
Sources:Amigo / QuickGO
Orthologs
Databases	NCBI: entry; OMA: entry
Species	Human	Mouse
Entrez	6191	20102
Ensembl	ENSG00000198034	ENSMUSG00000031320
UniProt	P62701	P62702
RefSeq (mRNA)	NM_001007	NM_009094
RefSeq (protein)	NP_000998	NP_033120
Location (UCSC)	Chr X: 72.26 – 72.28 Mb	Chr X: 101.23 – 101.23 Mb
PubMed search
- Wikidata
View/Edit Human	View/Edit Mouse

40S ribosomal protein S4, X isoform is a protein that in humans is encoded by the RPS4X gene.

Ribosomes, organelles that catalyze protein synthesis, consist of a small 40S subunit and a large 60S subunit. Together these subunits are composed of 4 RNA species and approximately 80 structurally distinct proteins. This gene encodes ribosomal protein S4, a component of the 40S subunit. Ribosomal protein S4 is the only ribosomal protein known to be encoded by more than one gene, namely this gene and ribosomal protein S4, Y-linked (RPS4Y). The 2 isoforms encoded by these genes are not identical, but are functionally equivalent. Ribosomal protein S4 belongs to the S4E family of ribosomal proteins. This gene is not subject to X-inactivation. It has been suggested that haploinsufficiency of the ribosomal protein S4 genes plays a role in Turner syndrome; however, this hypothesis is controversial. As is typical for genes encoding ribosomal proteins, there are multiple processed pseudogenes of this gene dispersed through the genome.
