= S4 protein domain =

S4
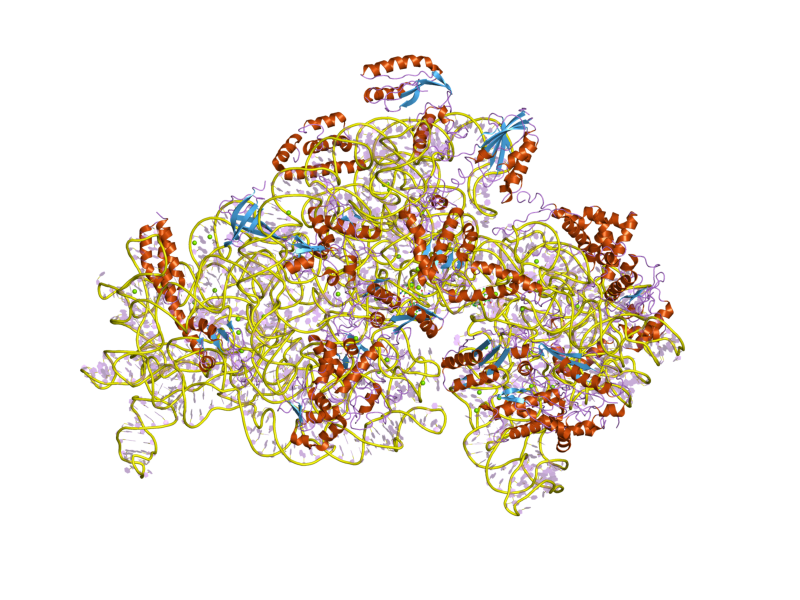

Identifiers
- Symbol: S4
- Pfam: PF01479
- Pfam clan: CL0492
- InterPro: IPR002942
- PROSITE: PDOC00549
- SCOP2: 1c06 / SCOPe / SUPFAM
- CDD: cd00165
Available protein structures:
- Pfam: structures / ECOD
- PDB: RCSB PDB; PDBe; PDBj
- PDBsum: structure summary

In molecular biology, S4 domain refers to a small RNA-binding protein domain found in a ribosomal protein named uS4 (called S9 in eukaryotes). The S4 domain is approximately 60-65 amino acid residues long, occurs in a single copy at various positions in different proteins and was originally found in pseudouridine syntheses, a bacterial ribosome-associated protein.

The S4 protein helps to initiate assembly of the 16S rRNA. In this way proteins serve to organise and stabilise the rRNA tertiary structure.

== Function ==
The function of the S4 domain is to be an RNA-binding protein. S4 is a multifunctional protein, and it must bind to the 16S ribosomal RNA. In addition, the S4 domain binds a complex pseudoknot and represses translation. More specifically, this protein domain delivers nucleotide-modifying enzymes to RNA and to regulates translation through structure specific RNA binding.

== Structure ==
The S4 protein domain is composed of three alpha helices and five beta strands. It is organized as an antiparallel sheet in a Greek key motif.
