= Haploinsufficiency of A20 =

- This condition is inherited in an autosomal dominant manner.
- Specialty: Immunology, Rheumatology, Medical genetics

Haploinsufficiency of A20 is a rare disease caused by mutations in the gene TNFAIP3. This gene is also known as A20.

== Signs and symptoms ==
These are variable even within families. the main features are recurrent oral, genital and/or gastrointestinal ulcers, musculoskeletal and gastrointestinal complaints, cutaneous lesions, episodic fever and recurrent infections. The age on onset is also variable ranging from the first week of life to 29 years. The male : female ratio is 1:3.

== Genetics ==
The TNFAIP3 gene is located on the long arm of chromosome 6 (6q23.3). Inheritance appears to be autosomal dominant with variable penetrance.

It appears that two copies of this gene are required to avoid inflammatory features developing - hence the name haploinsufficiency.

== Pathogenesis ==
The gene encodes a protein – Tumor necrosis factor alpha-induced protein 3 – which inhibits the pro inflammatory actions of NF-κB. The protein encoded has both ubiquitin ligation deubiquitinase activities and forms part of the ubiquitin editing protein complex. It is involved in several biochemical pathways the details of which are still under investigation.

== Diagnosis ==
Diagnosis is made by sequencing the TNFAIP3 gene. The usual laboratory tests are consistent with non-specific inflammation. Antinuclear antibodies and anti-dsDNA antibodies may be positive. Biopsies show non specific inflammatory changes.

=== Differential diagnosis ===
The main differential diagnosis are Behçet's disease and systemic lupus erythematosus.

== Treatment ==
Response to colchicine has been variable. Cytokine inhibitors – including the anti-IL6 receptor biologic tocilizumab – appear to be the most effective. Given the rarity of this condition, optimal management has not yet been definitely identified.

== History ==
This condition was first described in 2016.
