= Haploinsufficiency =

Concept in genetics

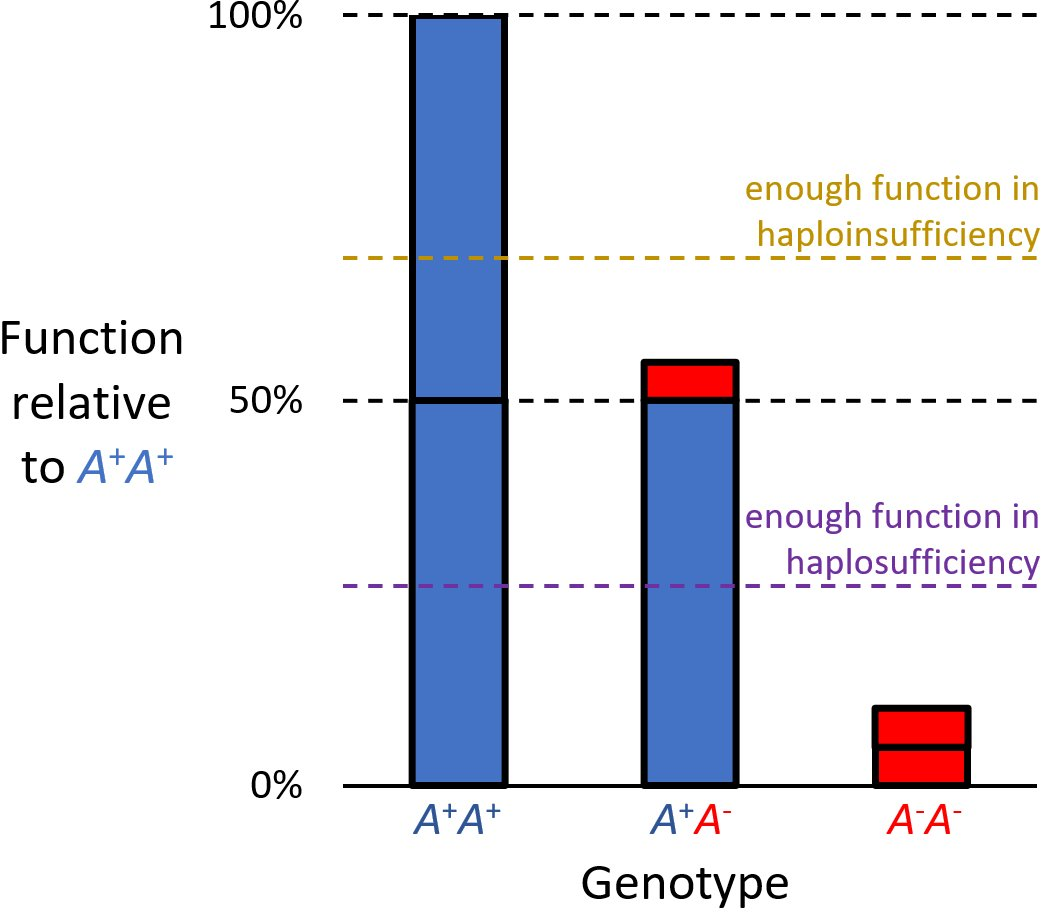
Haploinsufficiency model of dominant genetic disorders. A^{+} is a normal allele. A^{−} is a mutant allele with little or no function. In haplosufficiency (most genes), a single normal allele provides enough function, so A^{+}A^{−} individuals are healthy. In haploinsufficiency, a single normal allele does not provide enough function, so A^{+}A^{−} individuals have a genetic disorder.

Haploinsufficiency in genetics describes a model of dominant gene action in diploid organisms, in which a single copy of the wild-type allele at a locus in heterozygous combination with a variant allele is insufficient to produce the wild-type phenotype. Haploinsufficiency may arise from a de novo or inherited loss-of-function mutation in the variant allele, such that it yields little or no gene product (often a protein). Although the other, standard allele still produces the standard amount of product, the total product is insufficient to produce the standard phenotype. This heterozygous genotype may result in a non- or sub-standard, deleterious, and (or) disease phenotype. Haploinsufficiency is the standard explanation for dominant deleterious alleles.

In the alternative case of haplosufficiency, the loss-of-function allele behaves as above, but the single standard allele in the heterozygous genotype produces sufficient gene product to produce the same, standard phenotype as seen in the homozygote. Haplosufficiency accounts for the typical dominance of the "standard" allele over variant alleles, where the phenotypic identity of genotypes heterozygous and homozygous for the allele defines it as dominant, versus a variant phenotype produced only by the genotype homozygous for the alternative allele, which defines it as recessive.

== Mechanism ==
The alteration in the gene dosage, which is caused by the loss of a functional allele, is also called allelic insufficiency.

== Haploinsufficiency in humans ==
About 3,000 human genes cannot tolerate loss of one of the two alleles.

An example of this is seen in the case of Williams syndrome, a neurodevelopmental disorder caused by the haploinsufficiency of genes at 7q11.23. The haploinsufficiency is caused by the copy-number variation (CNV) of 28 genes led by the deletion of ~1.6 Mb. These dosage-sensitive genes are vital for human language and constructive cognition.

Another example is the haploinsufficiency of telomerase reverse transcriptase which leads to anticipation in autosomal dominant dyskeratosis congenita. It is a rare inherited disorder characterized by abnormal skin manifestations, which results in bone marrow failure, pulmonary fibrosis and an increased predisposition to cancer. A null mutation in motif D of the reverse transcriptase domain of the telomerase protein, hTERT, leads to this phenotype. Thus telomerase dosage is important for maintaining tissue proliferation.

A variation of haploinsufficiency exists for mutations in the gene PRPF31, a known cause of autosomal dominant retinitis pigmentosa. There are two wild-type alleles of this gene—a high-expressivity allele and a low-expressivity allele. When the mutant gene is inherited with a high-expressivity allele, there is no disease phenotype. However, if a mutant allele and a low-expressivity allele are inherited, the residual protein levels falls below that required for normal function, and disease phenotype is present.

Copy number variation (CNV) refers to the differences in the number of copies of a particular region of the genome. This leads to too many or too few of the dosage sensitive genes. The genomic rearrangements, that is, deletions or duplications, are caused by the mechanism of non-allelic homologous recombination (NAHR). In the case of the Williams Syndrome, the microdeletion includes the ELN gene. The hemizygosity of the elastin is responsible for supravalvular aortic stenosis, the obstruction in the left ventricular outflow of blood in the heart.

Other examples include:

- Some cancers
- 1q21.1 deletion syndrome
- 5q- syndrome in myelodysplastic syndrome (MDS)
- 22q11.2 deletion syndrome
- CHARGE syndrome
- Cleidocranial dysostosis
- Ehlers–Danlos syndrome
- Frontotemporal dementia caused by mutations in progranulin
- GLUT1 deficiency (DeVivo syndrome)
- Haploinsufficiency of A20
- Haploinsufficiency of PRR12
- Holoprosencephaly caused by haploinsufficiency in the Sonic Hedgehog gene
- Holt–Oram syndrome
- Marfan syndrome
- Phelan–McDermid syndrome
- Polydactyly
- Dravet syndrome
- ZTTK
- FOXP1 Syndrome
- NR4A2-related syndrome

== Methods of detection ==
The most direct method to detect haploinsufficiency is the heterozygous deletion of one allele in a model organism. This can be done in tissue culture cells or in single-celled organisms such as yeast (Saccharomyces cerevisiae).
