= Humoral immune deficiency =

- B cells and antibody
- Specialty: Hematology
- Symptoms: Sinusitis
- Causes: Absent B cells(primary), Multiple myeloma(secondary)
- Diagnostic method: B cell count, Family medical history
- Treatment: Immunoglobulin replacement therapy

Humoral immune deficiencies are conditions which cause impairment of humoral immunity, which can lead to immunodeficiency. It can be mediated by insufficient number or function of B cells, the plasma cells they differentiate into, or the antibody secreted by the plasma cells. The most common such immunodeficiency is inherited selective IgA deficiency, occurring between 1 in 100 and 1 in 1000 persons, depending on population. They are associated with increased vulnerability to infection, but can be difficult to detect (or asymptomatic) in the absence of infection.

== Signs and symptoms ==
Signs/symptoms of humoral immune deficiency depend on the cause, but generally include signs of infection such as:

- Sinusitis
- Sepsis
- Skin infection
- Pneumonia

== Causes ==
Hyper-IgM syndromes(immunoglobulin M)

Cause of this deficiency is divided into primary and secondary:

- Primary the International Union of Immunological Societies classifies primary immune deficiencies of the humoral system as follows:
  - Absent B cells with a resultant severe reduction of all types of antibody: X-linked agammaglobulinemia (btk deficiency, or Bruton's agammaglobulinemia), μ-Heavy chain deficiency, l 5 deficiency, Igα deficiency, BLNK deficiency, thymoma with immunodeficiency
  - B cells low but present, but with reduction in 2 or more isotypes (usually IgG & IgA, sometimes IgM): common variable immunodeficiency (CVID), ICOS deficiency, CD19 deficiency, TACI (TNFRSF13B) deficiency, BAFF receptor deficiency.
  - Normal numbers of B cells with decreased IgG and IgA and increased IgM: Hyper-IgM syndromes
  - Normal numbers of B cells with isotype or light chain deficiencies: heavy chain deletions, kappa chain deficiency, isolated IgG subclass deficiency, IgA with IgG subsclass deficiency, selective immunoglobulin A deficiency
  - Transient hypogammaglobulinemia of infancy (THI)
- Secondary secondary (or acquired) forms of humoral immune deficiency are mainly due to hematopoietic malignancies and infections that disrupt the immune system:
  - Multiple myeloma
  - Chronic lymphoid leukemia
  - AIDS

== Diagnosis ==
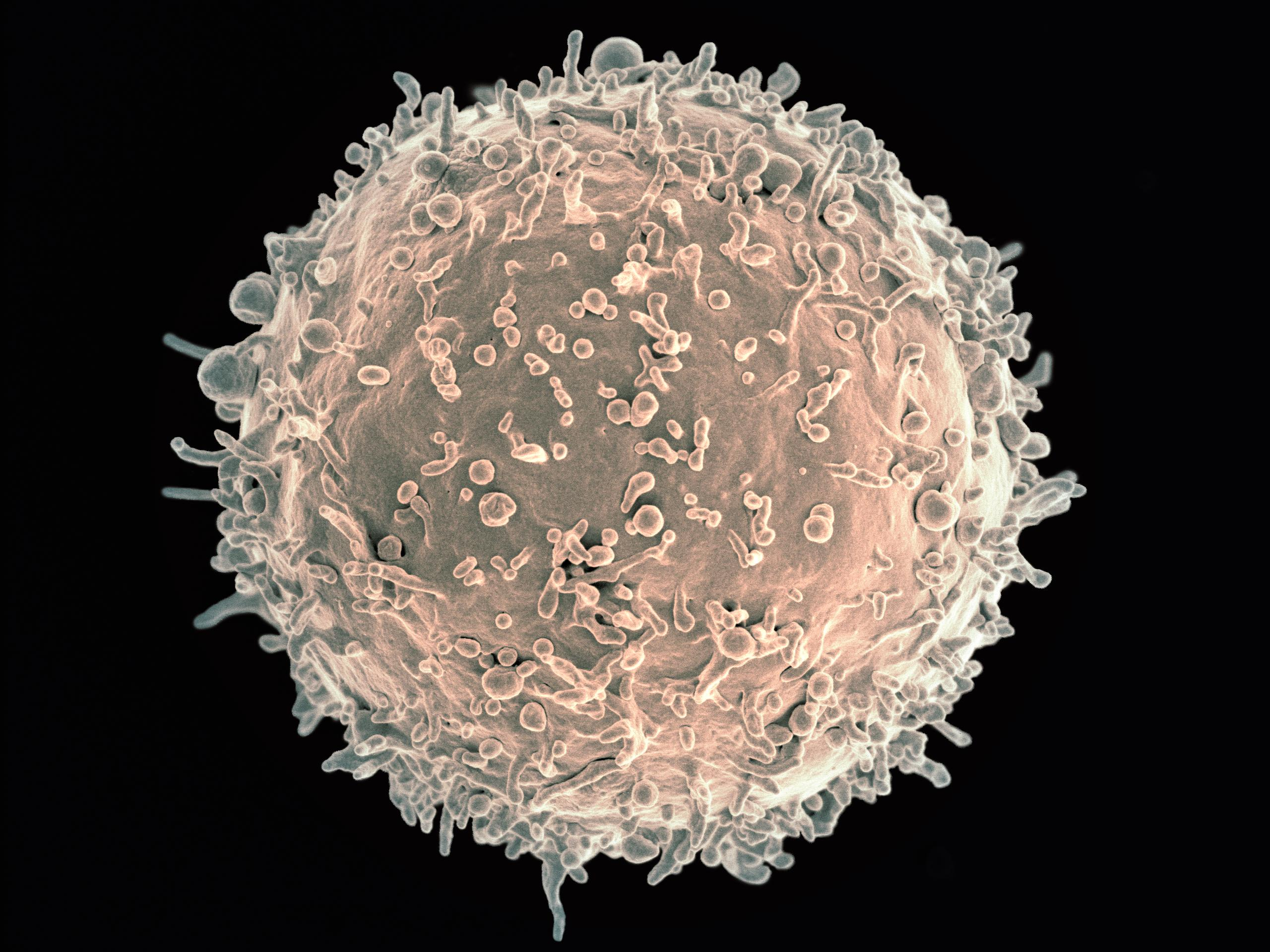
Human B cell

In terms of diagnosis of humoral immune deficiency depends upon the following:

- Measure serum immunoglobulin levels
- B cell count
- Family medical history

== Treatment ==
Treatment for B cell deficiency (humoral immune deficiency) depends on the cause, however generally the following applies:

- Treatment of infection (antibiotics)
- Surveillance for malignancies
- Immunoglobulin replacement therapy

== See also ==
- Immunodeficiency
- T cell deficiency
