= Inborn errors of immunity =

- Specialty: Clinical immunologist
- Usual onset: Newborns, children, and, uncommonly, adults
- Causes: Defects in specific genes
- Diagnostic method: Genetic testing
- Prognosis: Variable
- Frequency: Combined prevalence 1 in 1000 – 1 in 5000

Inborn errors of immunity (IEI) are a heterogenous group of disorders in which a mutation in any one of various genes that regulate the immune system causes increases in the susceptibility of individuals to develop a dysfunction in their immune system. As of 2024, there were 555 IEI conditions described. While each condition is individually rare, when taken together, it is estimated that between 1 in 1000 to 1 in 5000 people have some kind of inborn error of immunity.

== Classification ==
The International Union of Immunological Societies (2022) has classified IEI disorders into the following 10 categories:

1). Cellular and hormonal immunodeficiencies consisting of 66 defective genes causing 58 different diseases. These diseases include severe combined immunodeficiency diseases that are associated with low levels of CD3 protein-expressing T cells plus low levels of T-cell receptor excision circles (low levels of the circles indicate that the T cells have not matured); less severe forms of the combined immunodeficiencies are also included in this category.
2). Combined immunodeficiencies with associated or syndromic features consisting of 69 defective genes causing 68 diseases. These diseases are a set of signs and symptoms characteristic of a particular immune disorder and tend to occur together in people with the same disorder. These disorders include combined immunodeficiencies of T cells and B cells (i.e., gene defects that alter the development and function of the immune system).
3). Predominantly antibody disorders consisting of 45 defective genes causing 51 diseases. These antibody disorders include hypogammaglobulinemia, i.e., reductions in one or more of the four antibody classes, and other types of antibody deficiencies.
4). Diseases of immune dysregulation consisting of 52 defective genes causing 51 diseases. These diseases include hemophagocytic lymphohistiocytosis and defects that cause an increases in the susceptibility of individuals to develop Epstein–Barr virus-induced immunity disorders. (About 50% of all five-year-old children and 90% of adults have evidence of previous infection with this virus; see Epstein–Barr virus–associated lymphoproliferative diseases).
5). Congenital defects of phagocyte number or function consisting of 42 gene defects causing 35 diseases. These diseases include neutropenia not caused by antibodies directed against neutrophils and functional defects in phagocyte function.
6). Defects in intrinsic and innate immunity consisting of 74 gene defects causing 63 diseases. These diseases include a predisposition to develop bacterial, fungal, parasite and/or viral infections.
7). Autoinflammatory disorders consisting of 56 defective genes causing 59 diseases. These diseases include various types of autoinflammatory diseases, e.g., familial Mediterranean fever and Blau syndrome.
8). Complement deficiencies consisting of 36 defective genes causing 30 diseases. These diseases involve decreases in the levels of a component protein in the complement system (i.e., a system of proteins the increases the ability of antibodies and phagocytic cells to clear infecting microbes) and thereby increases an individual susceptibility to acquire Neisseria and pus-forming bacterial infections.
9). Bone marrow failure disorders consisting of 44 defective genes that cause 43 cases of Bone marrow failure. These disorders are losses in the levels of circulating red blood cells, white blood cells, and/or platelets due to the failure of the bone marrow to produce sufficient level of one or more of these cells.
10). Phenocopies of inborn errors of immunity consisting of 15 genes that cause 15 cases of various primary immunodeficiency diseases (i.e., PID) such as the chronic mucocutaneous candidiasis and the VEXAS syndrome. These phenocopy cases are due to somatic mutations that occur after fertilization of an ovum, i.e., they are mosaicism in which individuals developing from these post-fertilized ova have cells that do and do not have the altered gene that is responsible for a immune disorder. Depending on the amount and type of cells that express the dysfunctional gene, individuals may not develop the disorder or develop it in varying degrees of severity and/or develop it at a later age than individuals that have the dysfunctional gene in all cells. Usually, individuals with this mosaicism do not pass the defective gene to their offspring.

== History ==
A human immune disease that would later be classified as an IEI was first defined by Ogden Bruton. In the early 1950s, he examined an 8-year-old boy who had 19 episodes of pneumonia over a period of 4 years. Expecting that individuals with such a history of repeated infections would have high levels of infection-fighting antibodies in their serum, Dr. Bruton was surprised to find that the boy had hypogammaglobulinemia, i.e., his serum lacked detectable levels of circulating antibodies which attack infection-causing microorganisms and virus. That same year, Dr. Bruton and colleagues published on two other infection-prone patients who also lacked detectable levels of these serum antibodies This particular form of hypogammaglobulinemia, now termed X-linked agammaglobulinemia and characterized as an IEI, occurs in about 1 per 379,000 live births. It is also termed Bruton's agammaglobulinemia and the gene that when mutated causes this disease is termed the Bruton's tyrosine kinase, i.e., BTK, gene. The product of this gene, the BTK protein, contributes indirectly to promoting the production of all the antibody subtypes, i.e., IgG, IgA, IgM, and IgE.

In 1973, the World Health Organization (WHO) established the Inborn Errors of Immunity Committee for the purpose of classifying and identifying immune defects in humans. The committee focused on rare immune diseases. In the 1990s, the WHO decided to focus on more common diseases, and the committee was taken on by the International Union of Immunological Societies (i.e., IUIS). This relationship was made official in 2008. The number of genes that when mutated to cause specific IEI disorders has steadily rose from less than 10 in the 1980s to the IUIS expert committee's 2024 classification of 555 mutated genes causing these disorders. These numbers are expected to increase further as DNA sequencing using automated methods (e.g., massive parallel sequencing), further studies of less severe immune disorders, and analyses of multiple tissues in individuals that may have carry the dysfunctional gene in some but not their tissues (see mosaicism). Thus, the prevalence of IEIs in 2023 was estimated to be between 1 in 1,000 and 1 in 5,000 individuals but this may be an underestimate: its true prevalence may turn out to be as high as 1 in 500 individuals.

== Primary Immunodeficiencies ==
Impairments in the immune system's protective actions have been referred to as primary immunodeficiencies (PID), i.e., immune deficiencies that are present at birth and not caused by secondary factors such as other diseases or exposure to genotoxic agents. The PID disorders (see List of primary immunodeficiencies) and its subgroup, the primary immune regulatory disorders (PIRDs; i.e., disorders of immunity characterized as excessive proliferations of lymphocytes and the development of immune responses against one's own normal tissues), are immune disorders similar to those in IEI. Finally, inborn errors of metabolism (i.e., IEM) are a group of about 1700 disorders caused by a mutation in any one of about 1500 genes that causes a defect in a pathway that metabolizes proteins, fats, or carbohydrates or that impairs the function of a subcellular organelle. This mutation usually causes a complicated medical condition involving several human organ systems. When any one of the disorders in the PID, PIRDs, or IEM classifications is caused by a single gene mutation that disrupts the immune system, it is termed an IEI. Consequently, many IEIs are also termed a PID, PIRDs, and/or IEM.

Patient organisations such as the International Patient Organisation for Primary Immunodeficiencies (IPOPI) support awareness, advocacy, and improved care for individuals living with these conditions worldwide.

== Expression of IEI genes ==
As with other human genes, an IEI gene may be defective because it is not expressed (see gene expression), is under expressed, is overexpressed, or directs the formation of a product with reduced, increased, or no activity. Furthermore, the defective IEI gene in parents may not be expressed in their offspring depending on the IEI gene's dominant or recessive activity or may not be present in offspring depending on its location in the X chromosome, Y chromosome, or one of 46 remaining non-sex chromosomes (termed autosomes; see sex linkage). Individuals who do inherit an IEI gene may still not exhibit symptoms because: a) the gene is under expressed (termed reduced penetrrance) or not expressed (termed non-penetrance) in males or females (these different expression patterns are also termed gender-related penetrance), b) the presence of other genes which modify the activity of the inherited IEI gene (termed genetic modifiers), c) exposure to environmental factors with modify the activity of the inherited IEI gene (termed environmental modifiers), and/or d) epigenetic, i.e., caused by factors which regulate the expression of the IEI gene without changing this gene's nucleic acid sequence (termed epigenetic regulation). Mosaicism, i.e., an IEI mutation arising after fertilization of an egg, has been shown to lead to offspring with two different cell populations, one with and one without the IEI gene. Individuals with this mosaicism may develop a mild IEI disorder, an IEI disorder much later in life, or no IEI disorder.

== See also ==
- List of primary immunodeficiencies
- Inborn errors of metabolism
