= T cell deficiency =

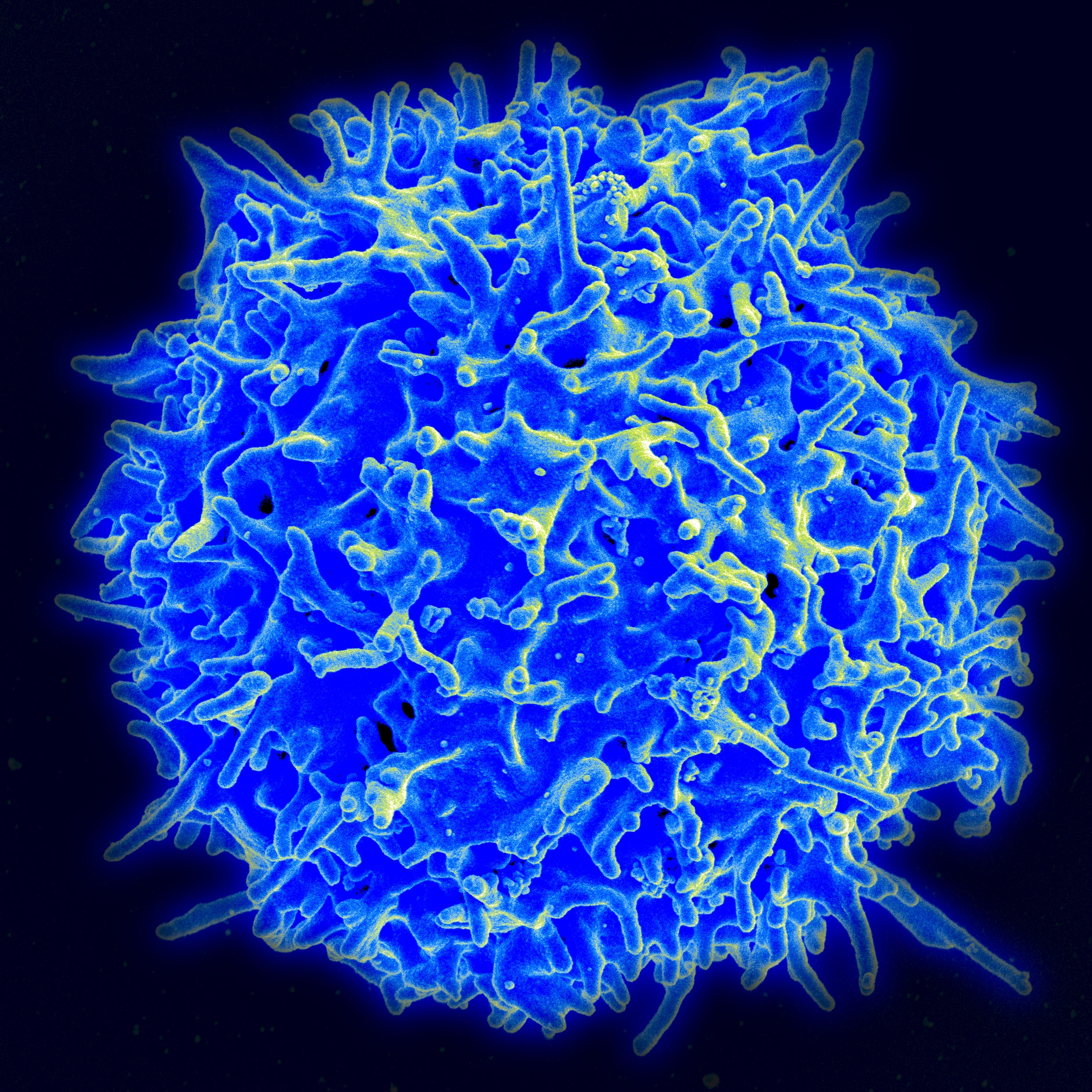
- Human T Cell
- Specialty: Immunology
- Symptoms: Eczematous
- Types: Primary or Secondary
- Diagnostic method: Delayed hypersensitivity skin test, T cell count
- Treatment: Bone marrow transplant, Immunoglobulin replacement

T cell deficiency is a deficiency of T cells, caused by decreased function of individual T cells. It causes an immunodeficiency of cell-mediated immunity. T cells normal function is to help with the human body's immunity, they are one of the two primary types of lymphocytes (the other being B cells).

== Symptoms and signs ==
Presentations differ among causes, but T cell insufficiency generally manifests as unusually severe common viral infections (respiratory syncytial virus, rotavirus), diarrhea, and eczematous or erythrodermatous rashes. Failure to thrive and cachexia are later signs of a T-cell deficiency.

== Mechanism ==
In terms of the normal mechanism of T cell we find that it is a type of white blood cell that has an important role in immunity, and is made from thymocytes. One sees in the partial disorder of T cells that happen due to cell signaling defects, are usually caused by hypomorphic gene defects. Generally, (micro)deletion of 22Q11.2 is the most often seen.

=== Pathogens of concern ===
The main pathogens of concern in T cell deficiencies are intracellular pathogens, including Herpes simplex virus, Mycobacterium and Listeria. Also, intracellular fungal infections are also more common and severe in T cell deficiencies. Other intracellular pathogens of major concern in T cell deficiency are:

- Mycobacterium avium intracellulare
- Salmonella species
- Rhodococcus equi
- Pneumocystis jirovecii
- Toxoplasma gondii
- Cryptosporidium parvum
- Leishmania species
- Herpesviridae (herpes simplex, cytomegalovirus and varicella zoster)
- Cryptococcus neoformans
- Histoplasma capsulatum

== Diagnosis ==
The diagnosis of T cell deficiency can be ascertained in those individuals with this condition via the following:

- Delayed hypersensitivity skin test
- T cell count
- Detection via culture(infection)

=== Types ===
==== Primary or secondary ====
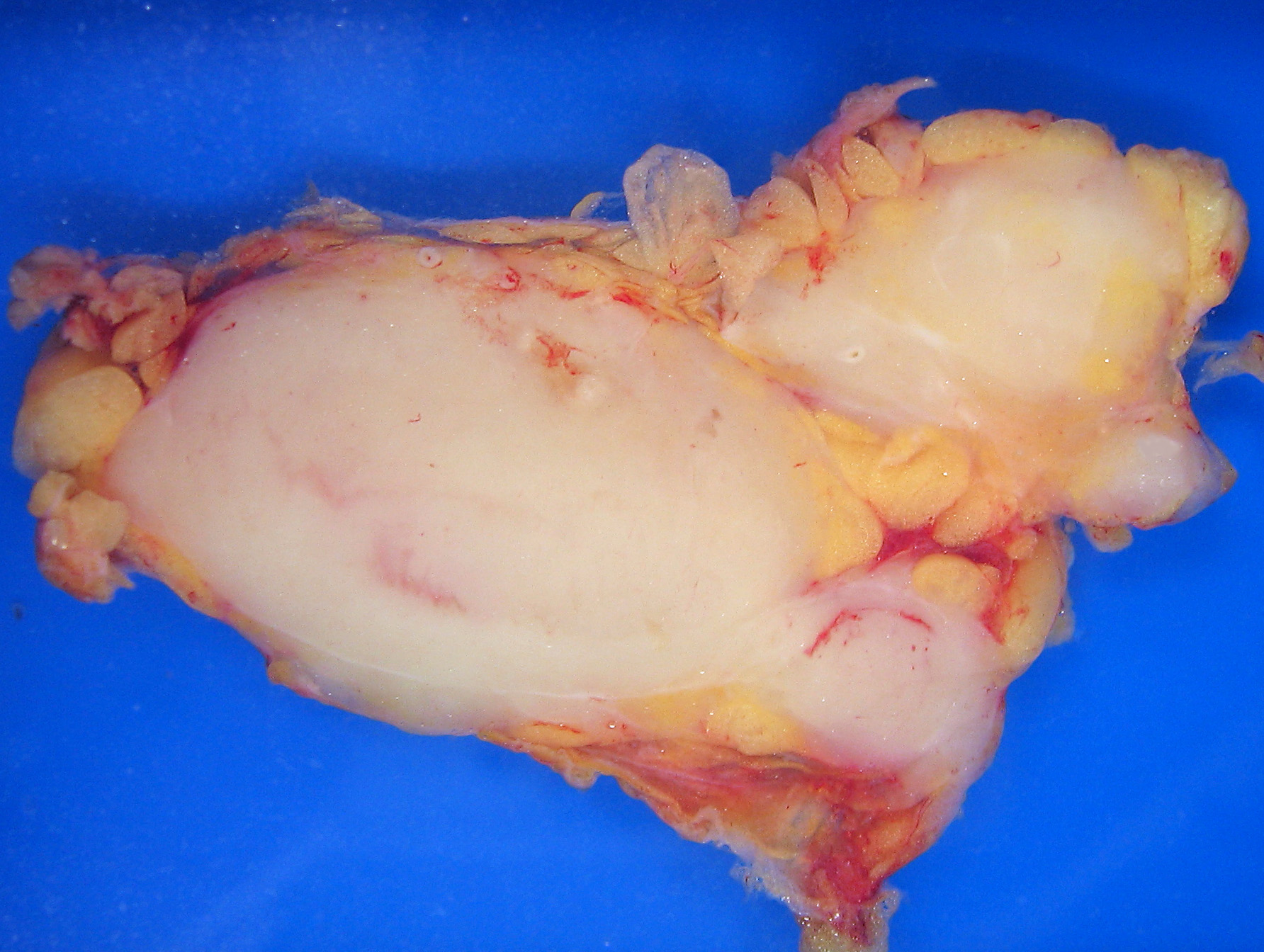
Lymphoma

- Primary (or hereditary) immunodeficiencies of T cells include some that cause complete insufficiency of T cells, such as severe combined immunodeficiency (SCID), Omenn syndrome, and Cartilage–hair hypoplasia.
- Secondary causes are more common than primary ones. Secondary (or acquired) causes are mainly:

- AIDS
- Cancer chemotherapy
- Lymphoma
- Glucocorticoid therapy

===== Complete or partial deficiency =====
- Complete insufficiency of T cell function can result from hereditary conditions (also called primary conditions) such as severe combined immunodeficiency (SCID), Omenn syndrome, and cartilage–hair hypoplasia.
- Partial insufficiencies of T cell function include acquired immune deficiency syndrome (AIDS), and hereditary conditions such as DiGeorge syndrome (DGS), chromosomal breakage syndromes (CBSs), and B-cell and T-cell combined disorders such as ataxia-telangiectasia (AT) and Wiskott–Aldrich syndrome (WAS).

===== Recognition of T cell deficiency =====
- Recognition of T cell disorders can involve identifying deficiencies in MHC class I or class II molecules. MHC class I and MHC class II molecules are cell-surface proteins that facilitate immune recognition by displaying peptide antigens to T lymphocytes. MHC class I presents peptides derived from intracellular proteins to CD8⁺ cytotoxic T cells, while MHC class II presents peptides originating from extracellular sources to CD4⁺ helper T cells. This antigen presentation allows the immune system to distinguish normal cells from those that are infected or otherwise altered, enabling an appropriate and targeted immune response. A deficiency in MHC class I interferes with the maturation of cytotoxic T cells (CD8+), which rely on MHC I for proper development, leading to a deficiency of these cells. Without functional MHC I, CD8+ T cells cannot effectively destroy virus-infected or abnormal cells. Similarly, MHC class II deficiency disrupts helper T cell (CD4+) maturation, leading to T cell deficiency, impaired activation of other immune cells, and a weakened immune response.

== Treatment ==
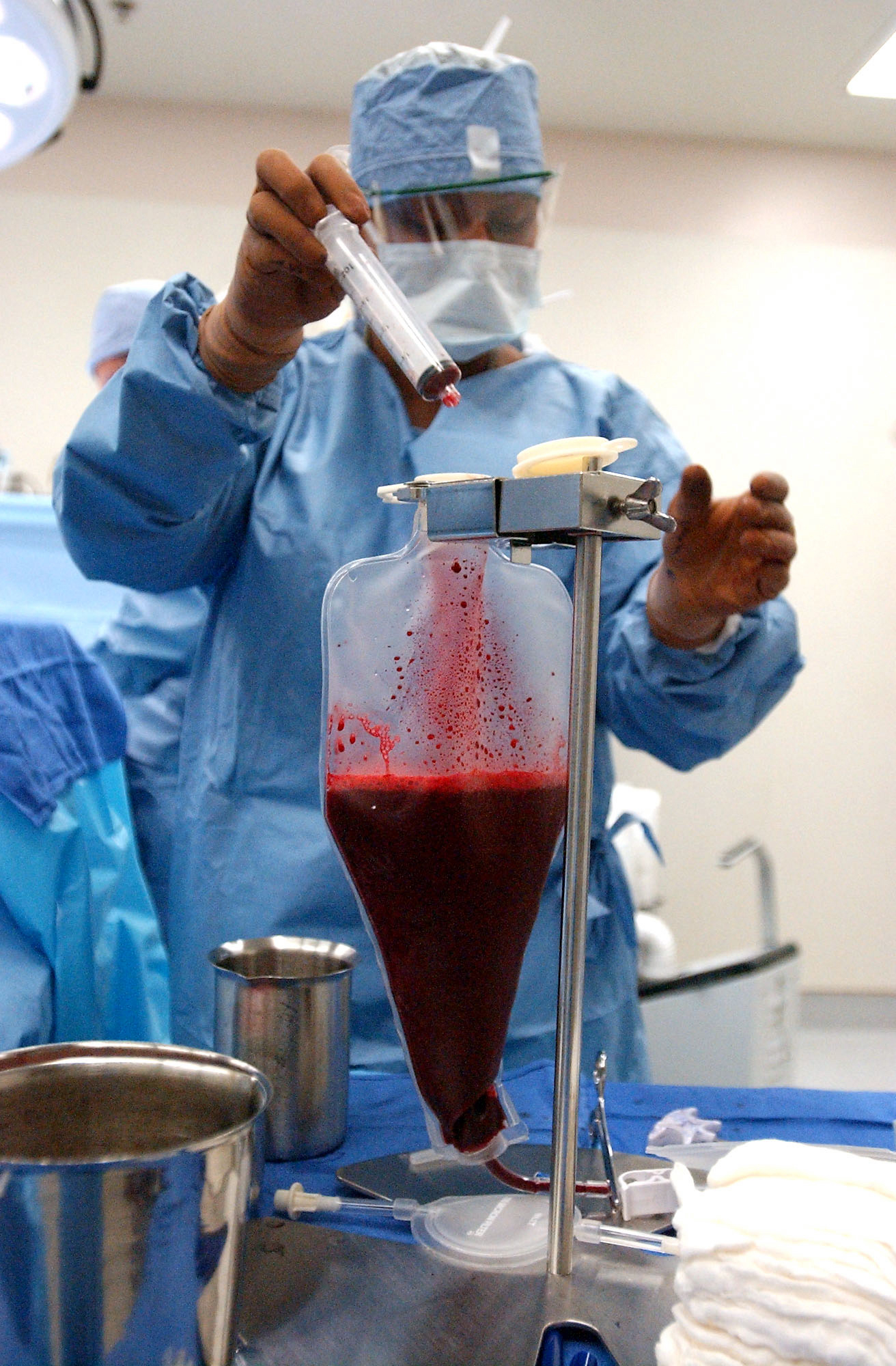
Harvested bone marrow in preparation for transplant

In terms of the management of T cell deficiency for those individuals with this condition the following can be applied:

- Killed vaccines should be used(not live vaccines in T cell deficiency)
- Bone marrow transplant
- Immunoglobulin replacement
- Antiviral therapy
- Supplemental nutrition

== Epidemiology ==
In the U.S. this defect occurs in about 1 in 70,000, with the majority of cases presenting in early life. Furthermore, SCID has an incidence of approximately 1 in 66,000 in California.

== See also ==
- B cell deficiency
