= Cernunnos deficiency =

- Other names: Combined immunodeficiency-microcephaly-growth retardation-sensitivity to ionizing radiation syndrome, Cernunnos XLFD
- Cernunnos deficiency is inherited via autosomal recession
- Symptoms: Microcephaly
- Causes: NHEJ1 gene mutation
- Diagnostic method: Clinical features
- Treatment: Immunoglobulin replacement, HSCT

Cernunnos deficiency is a form of combined immunodeficiency characterized by microcephaly, due to mutations in the NHEJ1 gene, it is inherited via autosomal recessive manner Management for this condition is antiviral prophylaxis and antibiotic treatment.

== Symptoms and signs ==
The sign and symptoms of this condition on an affected individual are as follows:

- Recurrent infections
- Microcephaly
- Growth retardation
- Bone-malformation
- Dysmorphic feature
- Urogenital malformations

== Cause ==
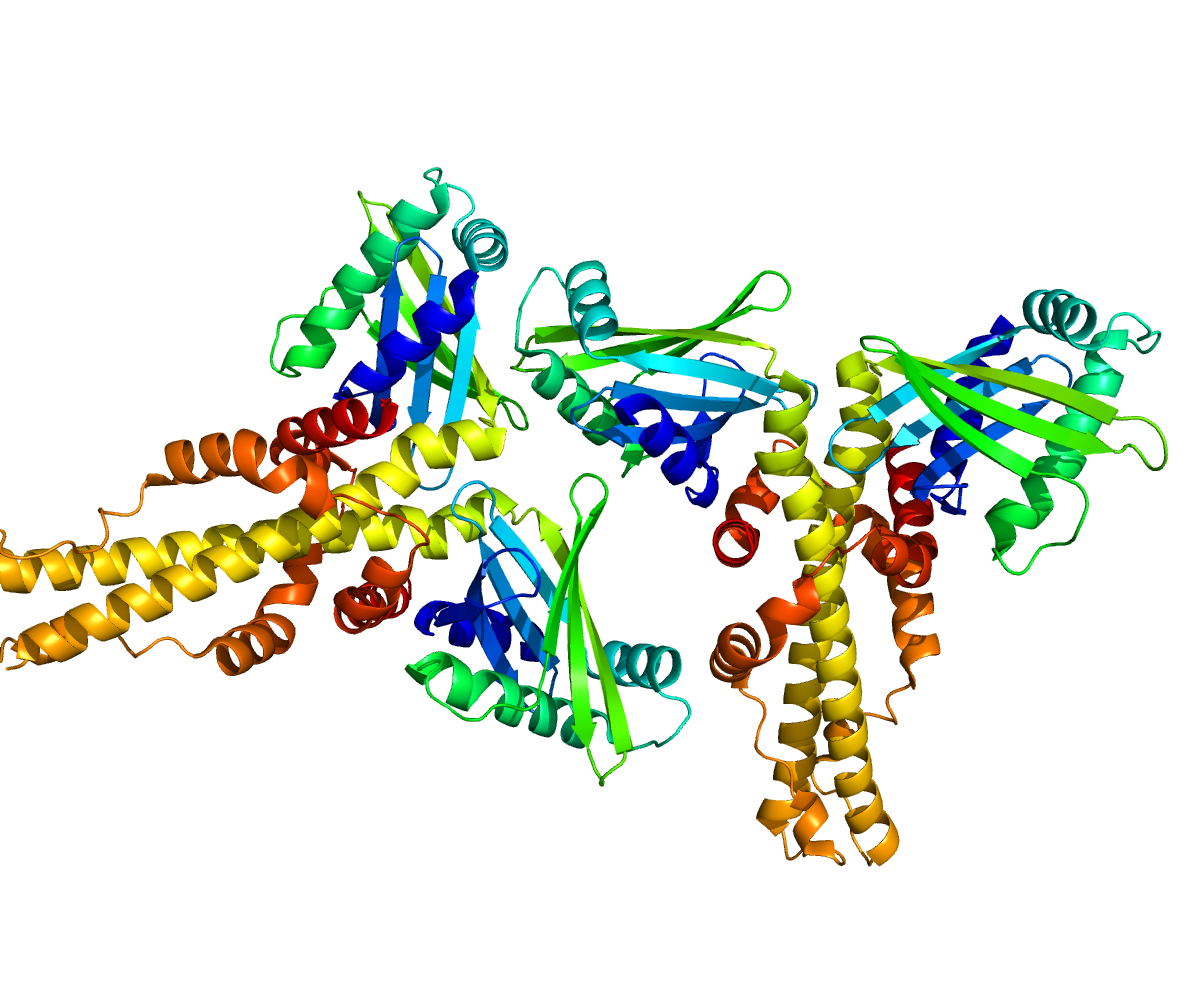
NHEJ1

In terms of genetics the condition, Cernunnos deficiency is due to a mutation in the NHEJ1 gene, it has a cytogenetic location of 2q35, while its molecular location is 219,075,324 to 219,160,865

== Mechanism ==
The pathophysiology of Cernunnos deficiency begins with normal function of Non-homologous end-joining factor 1 gene. NHEJ1 encodes a protein which helps repair of breaks in double-stranded DNA. It might additionally act as a connection between XRCC4 and other NHEJ factors (at DNA ends)

When a mutation occurs in NHEJ1, then one sees that nucleotide deletions cause V(D)J recombination, signal joints, to be affected. V(D)J recombination is a genetic recombination that happens in early stages of B and T cell maturation.

== Diagnosis ==
IgM

The diagnosis of Cernunnos deficiency will find the following in an affected individual via clinical features and blood test:

- B lymphopenia
- T lymphopenia
- Hypogammaglobulinemia with low IgA
- Hypogammaglobulinemia with low IgM

=== Differencial diagnosis ===
The DDx for Cernunnos deficiency are both LIG4 syndrome, as well as Nijmegen breakage syndrome

== Management ==
In terms of management for Cernunnos deficiency, one finds that treatment with allogeneic hematopoietic stem cell transplantation, which are stem cells that bring about other cells) has proven useful in some instances. Additionally the following treatments are also used:

- Antibiotic treatment
- Immunoglobulin replacement

== See also ==
- Cernunnos
- Combined immunodeficiency
