= Immune disorder =

- Other names: Autoimmune disease
- Specialty: Immunology

An immune disorder is a dysfunction of the immune system. These disorders can be characterized in several different ways:

- By the component(s) of the immune system affected
- By whether the immune system is overactive or underactive
- By whether the condition is congenital or acquired

According to the International Union of Immunological Societies, more than 150 primary immunodeficiency diseases (PIDs) have been characterized. However, the number of acquired immunodeficiencies exceeds the number of PIDs.

It has been suggested that most people have at least one primary immunodeficiency. Due to redundancies in the immune system, though, many of these are never detected.

== Autoimmune diseases ==
An autoimmune disease is a condition arising from an abnormal immune response to a normal body part. There are at least 80 types of autoimmune diseases. Nearly any body part can be involved. Common symptoms include low-grade fever and feeling tired. Often symptoms come and go.

=== List of some autoimmune disorders ===
- Alopecia areata
- Celiac disease
- Goodpasture syndrome
- Graves' disease
- Certain types of hemolytic anemia
- Immune thrombocytopenic purpura
- Lupus
- Lyme disease (late disseminated infection)
- Multiple sclerosis (although it is thought to be an immune-mediated process)
- Some types of myopathy
- Pernicious anemia
- Rheumatoid arthritis
- Scleroderma
- Type 1 diabetes
- Vasculitis

== Immunodeficiencies ==
Primary immune deficiency diseases are those caused by inherited genetic mutations. Secondary or acquired immune deficiencies are caused by something outside the body such as a virus or immune suppressing drugs.

Primary immune diseases are at risk to an increased susceptibility to, and often recurrent ear infections, pneumonia, bronchitis, sinusitis or skin infections. Immunodeficient patients may less frequently develop abscesses of their internal organs, autoimmune or rheumatologic and gastrointestinal problems.

Primary immune deficiencies

- Ataxia–telangiectasia
- Autoimmune lymphoproliferative syndrome (ALPS)
- Chronic granulomatous disease (CGD): a deficiency in NADPH oxidase enzyme, which causes failure to generate oxygen radicals. Classical recurrent infection from catalase positive bacteria and fungi.
- Common variable immunodeficiency (CVID): B cell levels are normal in circulation but with decreased production of IgG throughout the years, so it is the only primary immune disorder that presents onset in the late teens years.
- DiGeorge syndrome
- Hyper IgM syndrome: X-linked disorder that causes a deficiency in the production of CD40 ligand on activated T cells. This increases the production and release of IgM into circulation. The B cell and T cell numbers are within normal limits. Increased susceptibility to extracellular bacteria and opportunistic infections.
- Hyperimmunoglobulin E syndrome (also known as Job's Syndrome)
- Leukocyte adhesion deficiency (LAD)
- Selective immunoglobulin A deficiency: the most common defect of the humoral immunity, characterized by a deficiency of IgA. Produces repeating sino-pulmonary and gastrointestinal infections.
- Severe combined immunodeficiency (SCID)
- Wiskott–Aldrich syndrome (WAS)
- X-linked agammaglobulinemia (XLA; also known as Bruton type agammaglobulinemia): characterized by a deficiency in tyrosine kinase enzyme that blocks B cell maturation in the bone marrow. No B cells are produced to circulation and thus, there are no immunoglobulin classes, although there tends to be a normal cell-mediated immunity.
- X-linked lymphoproliferative disease (XLP)
- NF-κB Essential Modifier (NEMO) mutations

Secondary immune deficiencies

- AIDS

== Allergies ==
An allergy is an abnormal immune reaction to a harmless antigen.

- Allergic rhinitis
- Anaphylaxis
- Atopic dermatitis
- Food allergy
- Mastocytosis
- Perennial allergy
- Seasonal allergy

== Overactivation ==
Cytokine storms (excessive secretion of cytokines) are suspected as the cause of deaths in the 1918 "Spanish Flu" pandemic, acute pancreatitis, and COVID-19. Cytokine storm syndrome has multiple undesirable symptoms.

== See also ==
- Hypersplenism
- Disorders of human immunity
