= Acazicolcept =

Clinical data
- Other names: ALPN-101

Legal status
- Legal status: Investigational

Identifiers
- CAS Number: 2270247-50-0
- UNII: W507556HV0
- KEGG: D12300
- ChEMBL: ChEMBL5095304

Acazicolcept (ALPN-101) is an experimental dual CD28/ICOS antagonist developed by AbbVie. It appears to be a peptide with 363 residues.
