= European Society for Primary Immunodeficiencies =

European medical association

The European Society for Primary Immunodeficiencies (ESID) is a Europe-wide medical association for healthcare professionals and researchers who deal with primary immunodeficiency diseases (PID).

== History ==
The European Society for Primary Immunodeficiencies was founded first as an informal group in 1983 in Rome, Italy. Over the following decade its membership and activities grew, and the society's first constitution was adopted in 1994. This signaled ESID's beginnings as a formal society. The constitution has since been revised twice, in 2000 and 2008. ESID has two sister societies: The International Nursing Group for Immunodeficiencies and the International Patient Organisation for Primary Immunodeficiencies.

== Activities ==
ESID hosts biennial meetings for the society's members. These gatherings are composed of scientific lectures on emerging diagnoses and treatment options, interactive discussions, research opportunities, and networking events. The 15th Biennial Meeting will take place in October, 2012 in Florence, Italy.

The society also participates in several other scientific meetings each year, some of which are hosted by ESID. These meetings offer similar scientific content, though they are often smaller in their regional or educational focus. In 2011, ESID will host symposia in Prague and Tampere, Finland. The meeting taking place in Prague is ESID's 10th Spring Meeting and is part of ESIDS's PID Care in Development Working Party (PIDCD WP). Established in 2006, the PIDCD WP works to "increase awareness and facilitate diagnosis and care about PID patients in Western countries with less accessible PID care." The meetings that are part of this program focus on establishing professional organizations in developing regions and connecting professionals between different regions of Europe.

In addition to the PIDCD WP, ESID has several other Working Parties (WP). The Bone Marrow Transplantation and Gene Therapy Working Party works to "improve the outcome of transplant and gene therapy for severe congenital immunodeficiencies." The Clinical Working Party supports clinical research among ESPID members. The Educational Working Party works with young researchers and professionals in the PID field. The Genetic Working Party supports collaborative research between laboratories associated with ESPID. The Juniors Working Party is a forum for young entrants into the field of PID.

ESID has established biennial Summer Schools to educate young researchers and healthcare professionals in the field of primary immunodeficiency disorders (PID). The mission of these schools is to “enthuse, inform, and encourage the next generation of leaders in PID practice and research throughout Europe.” The curriculum consists of several days of workshops, discussions, and interaction between participants. Travel grants and scholarships are made available to encourage participation. The 2011 Summer School will be held in Il Ciocco, Tuscany, Italy.

ESID also maintains an online database containing patient data and information meant to be useful to potential researchers. The information is stripped of identifying factors on the part of the patients. As of March 2011, over 13,000 patients have been entered into the database.

== Governance ==
If you wish to see the full list of board members, kindly visit www.esid.org
