= Transient hypogammaglobulinemia of infancy =

- Specialty: Immunology

Transient hypogammaglobulinemia of infancy is a form of hypogammaglobulinemia appearing after birth, leading to a reduction in the level of IgG, and also sometimes IgA and IgM.

It can result in increased infections, but it can also present without symptoms.

== Signs and symptoms ==
Allergy disorders are the second most common feature, with upper and lower respiratory tract infections accounting for the majority of cases. In addition to developmental delay and cardiac defects, rare manifestations include gastroenteritis, invasive infections, and urinary tract infections.

== Causes ==
It is unknown what specifically causes infantile transient hypogammaglobulinemia. The following are some of the hypothesized mechanisms: 1) defective T cells that prevent B cells from stimulating the proper synthesis of antibodies; 2) maternal IgG suppresses the production of IgG; 3) low levels of vital cytokines; and 4) genetic variations in families predisposed to immunodeficiency.

== Mechanism ==
Normally, a newborn's immunoglobulins come from the mother during pregnancy and wane after birth until 3–6 months of age, when the infant begins to start to produce their own IgG. However, in transient hypogammaglobulinemia of infancy, the IgG synthesis is delayed, and the hypogammaglobulinemia is prolonged beyond age 6 months.

== Diagnosis ==
Transient hypogammaglobulinemia of infancy can be identified if the mean age-specific reference values for serum IgG levels are decreased by more than two standard deviations.

== Epidemiology ==
Transient hypogammaglobulinemia of infancy is thought to affect between 0.061 and 1.1 out of every 1000 live births.

== See also ==
- List of cutaneous conditions
