= Granulomatous–lymphocytic interstitial lung disease =

- Specialty: Pulmonology

Granulomatous–lymphocytic interstitial lung disease (GLILD) is a lung complication of common variable immunodeficiency disorders (CVID). It is seen in approximately 15% of patients with CVID. It has been defined histologically as the presence of (non-caseating) granuloma and lymphoproliferation in the lung. However, as GLILD is often associated with other auto-immune features such as splenomegaly, adenopathy and cytopenias, a definition based on abnormalities on lung imaging (CT scan) together with evidence of granulomatous inflammation elsewhere has also been employed.

Although infections and complications of infection such as bronchiectasis are more common complications of CVID in the lung, the presence of immune manifestations including GLILD is important because this has been associated with greater risk of death.

In general, as a rare complication of a rare disease, the condition remains incompletely understood, and there is real need for further research in the area.

== Signs and symptoms ==
People affected by GLILD may have symptoms such as cough and breathlessness, but may also be asymptomatic, with the condition first detected through abnormalities on lung function tests or a CT scan of the lungs.

== Risk factors ==
Why only some people with CVID are affected by GLILD remains unknown. However, there have been reports that elevated levels of IgM antibodies, altered T-cell function and/or proportionality of CD4:CD8 T cells may be associated with increased risk of GLILD, and GLILD has also been associated with specific genetic mutations in CVID, including CTLA-4 deficiency.

== Diagnosis ==
The diagnosis is usually suspected following a CT scan. Typical features on CT include solid and sub-solid nodules, ground glass change and reticulation. There may be features of multi-system involvement such as adenopathy and splenomegaly.

The commonest abnormality on lung function testing is a decrease in gas transfer. Both obstructive and restrictive patterns on spirometry have been reported.

The differential diagnosis includes infection, other interstitial lung diseases and malignant disease including lymphoma. Exclusion of infection is therefore an important step in management, but confirmation of the diagnosis requires lung biopsy. In people who have lung disease prior to a diagnosis of CVID, the differential diagnosis includes sarcoidosis. Sarcoid is also characterised by granulomatous involvement of the lung and therefore patients being investigated for sarcoid should have serum immunoglobulins measured to exclude CVID.

== Treatment ==
There are no current guidelines available on the investigation and management of GLILD and evidence is restricted to retrospective case series. Because of the association with poorer outcomes, and because some patients develop advanced lung disease, most specialists now recommend treatment in early disease, but this is always an individual decision between patient and health-care team. Many centres screen for the development of GLILD (and other lung complications) using regular lung function tests and CT scans.

Studies of GLILD have been conducted in patients on background immunoglobulin replacement. In a cohort of 59 CVID patients with granulomatous disease, 30 (51%) of whom had lung involvement, complete remission of disease was obtained in 5 of 25 attempts using corticosteroids (three patients), methotrexate (1 patient) and cyclophosphamide (1 patient). Partial responses were also seen with rituximab and hydroxychloroquine. In contrast, a second report suggested poor response to corticosteroids alone, but a good response to 18-months treatment with rituximab and azathioprine in seven patients. Bone marrow transplantation has been attempted. Immunosuppression has been associated with development of opportunistic infection and other predictable side effects, and the balance of risks and benefits of therapy must be carefully weighed in each case. This may be best achieved by joint working between immunology, respiratory, radiology and pathology specialists, working as part of a multi-professional team with the patient.

== Research ==
There is very little information written by, and for patients with GLILD. However, interest in the condition is increasing and multi-centre studies such as STILPAD are in progress.
