= Selective immunoglobulin A deficiency =

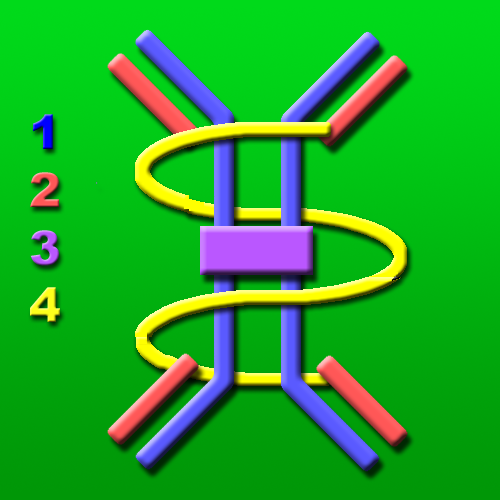
- The dimeric IgA molecule. 1 H-chain, 2 L-chain, 3 J-chain, 4 secretory component
- Specialty: Immunology

Selective immunoglobulin A (IgA) deficiency (SIgAD) is a kind of immunodeficiency, a type of hypogammaglobulinemia. People with this deficiency lack immunoglobulin A (IgA), a type of antibody that protects against infections of the mucous membranes lining the mouth, airways, and digestive tract. It is defined as an undetectable serum IgA level in the presence of normal serum levels of IgG and IgM, in people older than 4 years. It is the most common of the primary antibody deficiencies. However, most people with the condition remain healthy throughout their lives and are never diagnosed.

== Signs and symptoms ==
85–90% of IgA-deficient individuals are asymptomatic, although the reason for lack of symptoms is relatively unknown and continues to be a topic of interest and controversy. Some patients with IgA deficiency have a tendency to develop recurrent sinopulmonary infections, gastrointestinal infections and disorders, allergies, autoimmune conditions, and malignancies. These infections are generally mild and would not usually lead to an in-depth workup except when unusually frequent. They rarely present with severe reactions, including anaphylaxis, to blood transfusions or intravenous immunoglobulin due to the presence of IgA in these blood products. Patients have an increased susceptibility to pneumonia and recurrent episodes of other respiratory infections and a higher risk of developing autoimmune diseases in middle age.

IgA deficiency and common variable immunodeficiency (CVID) feature similar B cell differentiation arrests, but it does not present the same lymphocyte subpopulation abnormalities. IgA-deficient patients may progress to panhypogammaglobulinemia characteristic of CVID. Selective IgA and CVID are found in the same family.

Recent research suggests that while selective IgA deficiency may not increase susceptibility to initial SARS-CoV-2 (COVID 19) infection, it may be associated with a higher risk of recurrent infection and hospitalisation.

== Cause ==
Selective IgA deficiency is inherited in less than half of cases, but has been associated with differences in chromosomes 18, 14 and 6. Selective IgA deficiency can be inherited, but fewer than half of all cases have been associated with some congenital intrauterine infections.

== Pathophysiology ==
Pathogenesis of IgA Deficiency

'In IgA-deficient patients, the common finding is a maturation defect in B cells to produce IgA'. 'In IgA deficiency, B cells express IgA; however, they are of immature phenotype with the coexpression of IgM and IgD, and they cannot fully develop into IgA-secreting plasma cells'.

There is an inherited inability to produce immunoglobulin A (IgA), a part of the body's defenses against infection at the body's surfaces (mainly the surfaces of the respiratory and digestive systems). As a result, bacteria at these locations are somewhat more able to cause disease.

Types include:

Type	OMIM	Gene	Locus
IGAD1	137100	Unknown; MSH5 suggested	6p21
IGAD2	609529	TNFRSF13B	17p11

== Diagnosis ==
When suspected, the diagnosis can be confirmed by laboratory measurement of IgA level in the blood. SIgAD is an IgA level < 7 mg/dL with normal IgG and IgM levels (reference range 70–400 mg/dL for adults; children somewhat less).

== Treatment ==
The treatment consists of identification of co-morbid conditions, preventive measures to reduce the risk of infection, and prompt and effective treatment of infections. Infections in an IgA-deficient person are treated as usual (i.e., with antibiotics). There is no treatment for the underlying disorder. All SIgAD patients, even if asymptomatic, should receive pneumococcal and influenza vaccines, but should avoid live attenuated vaccines.

=== Use of IVIG as treatment ===
There is a historical popularity in using intravenous immunoglobulin (IVIG) to treat SIgAD, but the consensus is that there is no evidence that IVIG treats this condition. In cases where a patient presents SIgAD and another condition which is treatable with IVIG, then a physician may treat the other condition with IVIG. The use of IVIG to treat SIgAD without first demonstrating an impairment of specific antibody formation is not recommended.

== Prognosis ==
Prognosis is excellent, although there is an association with autoimmune disease. Of note, selective IgA deficiency can complicate the diagnosis of one such condition, celiac disease, as the deficiency masks the high levels of certain IgA antibodies usually seen in celiac disease.

As opposed to the related condition CVID, selective IgA deficiency is not associated with an increased risk of cancer.

Patients with Selective IgA deficiency rarely have severe reactions to blood transfusions. Although Selective IgA deficiency is common, severe reactions to blood transfusions are very rare. People with selective IgA deficiency do not require special blood products unless they have a history of a severe allergic reaction to a blood transfusion.

Patient education and ongoing monitoring are important components of care, particularly to identify complications such as recurrent infections or autoimmune disease.

== Epidemiology ==
Prevalence varies by population, but is on the order of 1 in 100 to 1 in 1000 people, making it relatively common. SIgAD occurs in 1 in 39 to 1 in 57 people with celiac disease. This is much higher than the prevalence of selective IgA deficiency in the general population. It is also significantly more common in those with type 1 diabetes.

It is more common in males than in females.

== See also ==
- B cell deficiency
