= Thymoma with immunodeficiency =

- Other names: Good syndrome

Thymoma with immunodeficiency (also known as "Good syndrome") is a rare disorder that occurs in adults in whom hypogammaglobulinemia, deficient cell-mediated immunity, and thymoma (usually benign) may develop almost simultaneously. Most reported cases are in Europe, though it occurs globally.

Dr. Robert Good was first to describe the association between thymoma and hypogammaglobulinemia in 1954. Much remains to be understood about its pathogenesis.

== Signs and symptoms ==
Most patients present with an immunodeficient state and recurrent sinopulmonary infections in their 4th or 5th decade of life. The immunodeficiency may occur before or after the diagnosis of a thymoma.

Immunodeficiency involves both deficient humoral and cellular immunity. Patients have low total serum antibodies. The thymoma may inhibit the thymus’s normal role in production of self-tolerant T lymphocytes. These T-lymphocytes then attack the B cell precursors in the marrow, preventing maturation and ultimately resulting in hypogammaglobulinemia.

It is characterized by increased susceptibility to bacterial, viral, and fungal infections. Good Syndrome is associated with other autoimmune conditions including pure red cell aplasia and myasthenia gravis.

== Pathogenesis ==
The cause of Good Syndrome is unknown. It is thought to be an autoimmune process affecting the bone marrow.

== Diagnosis ==
=== Definition ===
There are no formal diagnostic criteria. Typical laboratory evaluation includes quantitative immunoglobulin levels and lymphocyte subset analysis to assess B, T, and natural killer cell populations. Generally it can be defined as an adult-onset primary immunodeficiency associated with thymoma, hypogammaglobulinemia, diminished B and T cells, and inverted CD4/CD8+ ratio. It has been suggested that Good Syndrome is a subset of common variable immunodeficiency (CVID).

== Treatment ==
The mainstay of treatment consists of thymectomy, prophylactic antibiotics, and immunoglobulin replacement with intravenous immunoglobulin. Although thymectomy is performed for oncological management, hypogammaglobulinemia typically persists following surgical resection. Immunosuppression is sometimes used.

The Centers for Disease Control and Prevention recommend pneumococcal, meningococcal, and Hib vaccination in those with diminished humoral and cell-mediated immunity.

Some have advocated prophylaxis with trimethoprim-sulfamethoxazole if CD4 counts are lower than 200 cells/mm^3, similar to HIV/AIDS patients.

== See also ==
- Skin lesion
