= CD25 deficiency =

- Other names: Interleukin-2 receptor alpha chain deficiency
- This condition is inherited in an autosomal recessive manner.

CD25 deficiency or interleukin 2 receptor alpha deficiency is an immunodeficiency disorder associated with mutations in the interleukin 2 receptor alpha (CD25) (IL2RA) gene. The mutations cause expression of a defective α chain or complete absence thereof, an essential part of high-affinity interleukin-2 (IL-2) receptors. The result is a syndrome described as IPEX-like or a SCID.

In one patient, deficiency of CD25 on CD4+ lymphocytes caused significantly impaired sensitivity to IL-2. This was demonstrated by a lack of measurable response in anti-inflammatory interleukin-10 (IL-10) secretion to low-dose IL-2 incubation. Greatly reduced IL-10 secretion compared to healthy humans results in a syndrome comparable to IPEX syndrome, a type of autoimmunity which is caused by FoxP3 transcription factor dysfunction. In addition to IPEX-like symptoms, CD25 deficiency increases susceptibility to viral infections and possibly fungal and bacterial infections.

As IL-2 is an important inducer of lymphocyte proliferation, the absence of highly sensitive IL-2 receptors may also significantly hinder activation and clonal expansion of CD8+ and CD4+ lymphocytes and NK cells. One case also reported the absence of CD1, a MHC-like glycoprotein involved in the presentation of lipid antigens to T cells, in a CD25 deficient patient. Furthermore, chronic upregulation of anti-apoptotic Bcl-2 in thymocytes was also described possibly allowing autoreactive T cells to escape deletion.
