= International Patient Organisation for Primary Immunodeficiencies =

- Abbreviation: IPOPI
- Formation: 1992
- Founder: Bob Lebien; Helen Chapel; Martin Gatehouse; Robin Fanshawe; Fiona Sandford; Maj-lis Helström
- Founded at: Lugano, Switzerland
- Type: Non-profit association
- Legal status: AISBL
- Purpose: Advocacy, awareness and support for primary immunodeficiency patients
- Headquarters: Brussels, Belgium
- Region served: Worldwide
- Official language: English
- President: Martine Pergent
- Website: ipopi.org

The International Patient Organisation for Primary Immunodeficiencies (IPOPI) is a global non-profit association for patients with primary immunodeficiencies (PIDs). Established in 1992, IPOPI advocates for improved awareness, early diagnosis, and access to treatment for PID patients worldwide.

== History ==
IPOPI traces its origins to a 1990 meeting in Oxford, United Kingdom, where representatives from national patient groups identified the need for international collaboration. Two years later, in 1992, IPOPI was formally founded during a follow-up gathering in Lugano, Switzerland. Notable figures in its creation included Bob LeBien (a leading U.S. patient advocate), Prof. Helen Chapel of Oxford, and others from Europe such as Martin Gatehouse (Switzerland), Robin Fanshawe and Fiona Sandford (UK), and Maj-Lis Helström (Sweden). LeBien, whose own family was affected by immunodeficiency, served as the first chair of IPOPI and was later honored as the organisation's president for Life for his pivotal role.

In 2004, Jose Drabwell joined the board and subsequently served as president, who oversaw a period of geographic expansion during the late 2000s and 2010s. Johan Prevot joined IPOPI in 2010 and became IPOPI's Executive Director in 2011. Mr Prevot has helped IPOPI become the leading advocate for PID patients worldwide through stakeholder collaboration. In 2018, Martine Pergent was elected as the organisation's president. By 2024, IPOPI reported uniting approximately 75 national member organisations.

IPOPI has held Global Patients’ Meetings (GPM) for its national member organisations on even years ever since it was launched in 1992. The GPM is traditionally organised in parallel to the meetings of the European Society for Primary Immunodeficiencies (ESID) and International Nursing Group for Immunodeficiencies (INGID). In 2013, IPOPI launched the International Primary Immunodeficiencies Congress (IPIC) in Estoril, Portugal, a biennial scientific meeting focused on clinical care and diagnosis. In 2022, the organisation initiated the annual Global Multi-Stakeholders’ Summit to address future challenges in PID care. IPOPI maintains a consultative relationship with the European Medicines Agency (EMA). In 2023, it signed a partnership agreement with the United Nations Institute for Training and Research (UNITAR) to enhance access to plasma-derived therapies globally.

== Operations ==
IPOPI functions as an advocacy, awareness, and support organisation for the primary immunodeficiency community worldwide. It is legally registered in Belgium as an international non-profit (aisbl) and coordinates a network of national member organisations across Europe, the Americas, Africa, Asia, and Oceania. IPOPI engages in lobbying and policy work, often collaborating with physicians and researchers to influence healthcare policy. For example, the organisation has been involved in advocating for newborn screening programs (such as for severe combined immunodeficiency) and for reliable supplies of immunoglobulin therapies, which are life-saving treatments for many PID patients.
