= Cartilage–hair hypoplasia =

Cartilage-hair hypoplasia
- Other names: McKusick type metaphyseal chondrodysplasia
- Cartilage-hair hypoplasia has an autosomal recessive pattern of inheritance
- Pronunciation: /ˌkɑːrtɪlɪdʒ ... ˌhaɪpoʊˈpleɪʒə/
- Symptoms: Short limb dwarfism Very fine thin light hairs and eyebrows Hyperextensible joints of hand and feet Abnormalities of spine Neutropenia; Defective antibody and cell mediated immunity

Cartilage–hair hypoplasia (CHH) is a rare genetic disorder. Symptoms may include short-limbed dwarfism due to skeletal dysplasia, variable level of immunodeficiency, and predisposition to cancer. It was first reported by Victor McKusick in 1965.

== Signs and symptoms ==
- Short limb dwarfism
- Very fine, light hairs and eyebrows
- Hyperextensible joints of hand and feet
- Abnormalities of spine
- Neutropenia
- Defective antibody and cell mediated immunity

== Genetics ==
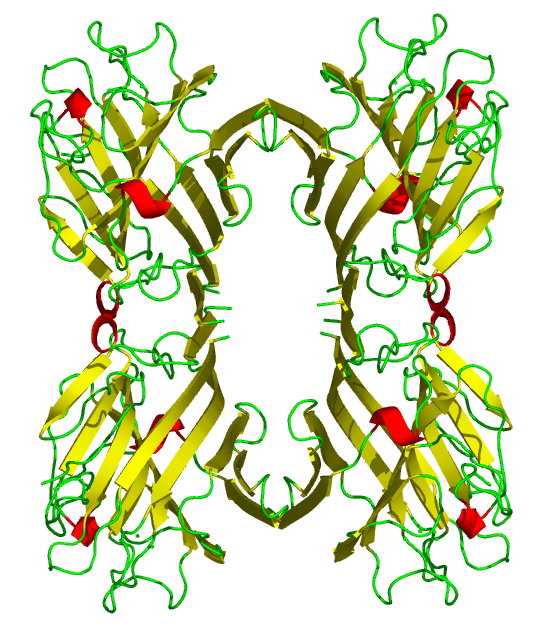
Phytohemagglutinin

CHH is an autosomal recessive inherited disorder. It is a highly pleiotropic disorder. A rarely encountered genetic phenomenon, known as uniparental disomy (a genetic circumstance where a child inherits two copies of a chromosome from one parent, as opposed to one copy from each parent) has also been observed with the disorder.

An association between mutations near or within the ncRNA component of RNase MRP, RMRP, has been identified. The endoribonuclease RNase MRP is a complex of RNA molecule and several proteins and it participates in cleavage of mitochondrial primers responsible for DNA replication and in pre-rRNA processing in the nucleolus. The locus of the gene has been mapped to the short arm of chromosome 9.

=== Immunodeficiency ===
Patients with CHH usually suffer from cellular immunodeficiency. In the study of 108 Finnish patients with CHH, mild to moderate form of lymphopenia was detected along with decreased delayed type of hypersensitivity and impaired responses to phytohemagglutinin. This leads to susceptibility to and, in some more severe cases, mortality from infections early in childhood. There has also been detected combined immunodeficiency in some patients. Patients with CHH often have increased predispositions to malignancies.

== Treatment ==
A verified treatment for this disease is yet to be discovered.

== In media ==
In House season 3 episode 10 entitled "Merry Little Christmas," the primary patient of the episode had been falsely diagnosed previously with this condition as her mother has it. By the end, she was instead diagnosed with Langerhans cell histiocytosis, which caused her short stature due to the tumor affecting her pituitary.

== See also ==
- List of cutaneous conditions
- List of radiographic findings associated with cutaneous conditions
