= Ogden Bruton =

American pediatrician

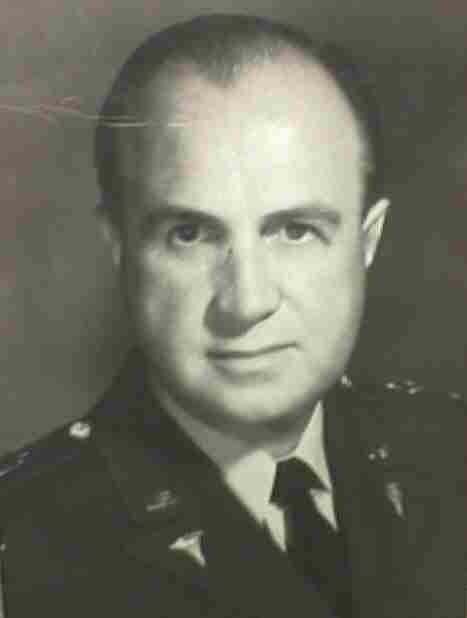
Ogden Carr Bruton

Ogden Carr Bruton (14 June 1908, Mount Gilead, North Carolina – 20 January 2003) was a pediatrician and chief of pediatrics at Walter Reed Army Hospital, where he organized the first pediatric residency at this hospital. He made important advances in the field of immunology as an immunologist. The condition he discovered is sometimes referenced by his name: "Bruton-type agammaglobulinemia". The gene associated with this defect is also named after him: Btk, abbreviation for Bruton's tyrosine kinase.

== Education ==
He matriculated at age 16 into Trinity College, which later became Duke University. He graduated from Duke in 1929, and then Vanderbilt University School of Medicine in 1933, the latter with honors. He remained at Duke for his pediatric residency, completing his training in 1936. Thereafter he remained at Vanderbilt as faculty.

== Medical and military career ==
Bruton received a Commonwealth Fund Fellowship in 1938–1939 and spent a year at the Child Guidance Clinic of Los Angeles and at the Pediatric Psychiatry Clinic of Babies Hospital in New York. He returned to Vanderbilt, where he entered the peacetime Army as a reserve officer to serve one year in 1940. However, this turned out to be his first step in his subsequent 21-year military career. He went on tours at Walter Reed, the 210th General Hospital, Fort Gulick, Panama, the Army Regional Hospital, Fort Knox, Kentucky, and Tripler General Hospital, Hawaii. On May 28, 1944, he married Melda Kathryn (Kay) Dove of Winchester, Virginia. She would give birth to a daughter, Kathryn Jo, and a son, Odgen Carr Jr. In 1946, Bruton went briefly into private practice in Winston-Salem, North Carolina, but he returned to Walter Reed that same year to serve as a consultant to the Army Surgeon General's Office. He received a regular Army commission and went to Europe on an assignment to improve the health conditions of immigrating war brides and their children. Thereafter, he returned to Walter Reed a second time to develop the Army's first pediatric training program. Concurrently, he became a clinical professor of pediatrics at Georgetown University School of Medicine. He also served as a consultant at the Children's Hospital, Washington, D.C. From 1955 to 1958 while he served as the pediatric chief at Tripler General Hospital, Hawaii starting a pediatric training program there as well. Colonel Leo Geppert served at Walter Reed in the interim, but Bruton returned in 1958 to serve again as chief until he retired in 1961, whereupon he turned the department over to Colonel Ed Tomsovic.

In 1992, Bruton was awarded the Department of Defense Distinguished Civilian Service Award, the highest Department of Defense award given to civilians requiring the approval of the Secretary of Defense.

His papers are held at the National Library of Medicine.

== Discovery of Bruton’s Agammaglobulinemia ==
While at Walter Reed during his second tour, Bruton studied an 8-year-old boy, Joseph S. Holtoner Jr., who had recurrent pneumonia infections and who lacked gamma globulin in his serum. This type of agammaglobulinemia is now called Bruton's syndrome or X-linked agammaglobulinemia, which was later found by others to be an X-linked congenital condition. The gene defect has since been mapped to the gene code for Bruton's tyrosine kinase (Btk), at band Xq21.3.

Bruton wrote to medical schools in the United States of America that had a pediatric service to ask if they had any such patients with agammaglobulinemia. His findings were published in June 1952 in the journal "Pediatrics". Bruton was also the first physician to provide specific immunotherapy for this X-linked disorder by administering intramuscular injections of IgG immunoglobulin. Time magazine featured Bruton and his medical discovery in the May 18, 1953 issue. There is also a milder form of X-linked congenital Swiss-type agammaglobunemia referred to as Bruton-Gitlin syndrome. It is characterized by decreased amounts of humoral gammaglobulin in serum, with cellular functional deficiencies as well. There is also a defect in the Btk gene in this condition.

== The Ogden C. Bruton Award ==
This citation is an award given annually for the best paper submitted by a military pediatrician for either basic or applied research on the development, evaluation, or application of technology in pediatrics. The award is named in honor of Bruton. List of award recipients since 1969:

== The Ogden C. Bruton Lectureship ==
This lectureship is an honor bestowed on a speaker at the military section of the American Academy of Pediatrics Annual Meeting each year. List of speakers since 1980:

== Selected works ==
- Bruton OC. Diet of infants and children in disaster. Pediatr Clin North Am. 1962 Nov;9:1025-31
- Bruton OC. A decade with agammaglobulinemia. J Pediatr. 1962 May;60:672-6
- Andrews BF, Bruton OC, De Baare L. Serum amino acid nitrogen in infancy and childhood. J Pediatr. 1962 Feb;60:201-5.
- Andrews BF, Bruton OC, Knoblock EC. Sweat chloride concentration in children with allergy and with cystic fibrosis of the pancreas. Pediatrics. 1962 Feb;29:204-8
- Bruton OC. Agammaglobulinemia. Pediatrics 1952 Jun:9(6):722-8
- Moseley RW, Bruton OC. Hemophilia in children: with a suggestion for prophylactic control; report of four cases. Arch Pediatr. 1951 Nov;68(11):526-32.
- Bruton OC. Agenesis of abdominal musculature associated with genitourinary and gastro-intestinal tract anomalies. J Urol. 1951 Oct;66(4):607-11.
- Rosenzweig L, Bruton OC. Pernicious anemia in an eight-year-old girl; additional observations in a case previously reported as nutritional anemia in an infant responding to purified liver extract. Pediatrics. 1950 Aug;6(2):269-76.
