= Immunodeficiency =

Lack of or compromised immune system

- Other names: Immunocompromise, immune deficiency, immunocompromisation
- Specialty: Immunology
- Medication: Imuran

Immunodeficiency, also known as immunocompromise, is a state in which the immune system's ability to fight infectious diseases and cancer is compromised or entirely absent. Most cases are acquired ("secondary") due to extrinsic factors that affect the patient's immune system. Examples of these extrinsic factors include HIV infection and environmental factors, such as nutrition. Immunocompromisation may also be due to genetic diseases/flaws such as SCID.

In clinical settings, immunosuppression by some drugs, such as steroids, can either be an adverse effect or the intended purpose of the treatment. Examples of such use include organ transplant surgery as an anti-rejection measure and in patients with an overactive immune system, such as in autoimmune diseases. Some people are born with intrinsic defects in their immune system, or primary immunodeficiency.

A person who has an immunodeficiency of any kind is said to be immunocompromised. An immunocompromised individual may be particularly vulnerable to opportunistic infections, in addition to normal infections that could affect anyone. It also decreases cancer immunosurveillance, in which the immune system scans the body's cells and kills neoplastic ones. They are also more susceptible to infectious diseases owing to the reduced protection afforded by vaccines.

== Types ==
=== By affected component ===
- Humoral immune deficiency (including B cell deficiency or dysfunction), with signs or symptoms depending on the cause, but generally include signs of hypogammaglobulinemia (decrease of one or more types of antibodies) with presentations including repeated mild respiratory infections, and/or agammaglobulinemia (lack of all or most antibody production) which results in frequent severe infections and is often fatal.
- T cell deficiency, often causes secondary disorders such as acquired immune deficiency syndrome (AIDS).
- Granulocyte deficiency, including decreased numbers of granulocytes (called as granulocytopenia or, if absent, agranulocytosis) such as of neutrophil granulocytes (termed neutropenia). Granulocyte deficiencies also include decreased function of individual granulocytes, such as in chronic granulomatous disease.
- Asplenia, where there is no function of the spleen
- Complement deficiency is where the function of the complement system is deficient

In reality, immunodeficiency often affects multiple components, with notable examples including severe combined immunodeficiency (primary) and acquired immune deficiency syndrome (secondary).

Comparison of immunodeficiencies by affected component
	Affected components	Main causes	Main pathogens of resultant infections
Humoral immune deficiency B cell deficiency	B cells, plasma cells or antibodies	Primary humoral; Multiple myeloma; Chronic lymphoid leukemia; AIDS	Streptococcus pneumoniae; Hemophilus influenzae; Pneumocystis jirovecii; Giardia intestinalis; Cryptosporidium parvum
T cell deficiency	T cells	Marrow and other transplantation; AIDS; Cancer chemotherapy; Lymphoma; Glucocorticoid therapy	Intracellular pathogens, including Herpes simplex virus, Mycobacterium, Listeria, and intracellular fungal infections.
Neutropenia	Neutrophil granulocytes	Chemotherapy; Bone marrow transplantation; Dysfunction, such as chronic granulomatous disease	Enterobacteriaceae; Oral Streptococci; Pseudomonas aeruginosa; Enterococcus species; Candida species; Aspergillus species
Asplenia	Spleen	Splenectomy; Trauma; Sickle-cell anemia	Polysaccharide encapsulated bacteria, particularly: Streptococcus pneumoniae; Haemophilus influenzae; Neisseria meningitidis; Plasmodium species; Babesia species
Complement deficiency	Complement system	Congenital deficiencies	Neisseria species; Streptococcus pneumoniae

=== Primary or secondary ===
The distinction between primary and secondary immunodeficiencies is based on whether the cause originates in the immune system itself or insufficiency of a supporting component or an external factor.

==== Primary immunodeficiency ====
Several rare diseases increase susceptibility to infections from childhood onward. Primary immunodeficiency is also known as congenital immunodeficiency. Many of these disorders are hereditary and are autosomal recessive or X-linked. There are over 95 recognised primary immunodeficiency syndromes; they are generally grouped by the part of the immune system that is malfunctioning, such as lymphocytes or granulocytes.

The treatment of primary immunodeficiencies depends on the nature of the defect. It may involve antibody infusions, long-term antibiotics, and, in some cases, stem cell transplantation. The characteristics of lacking and/or impaired antibody functions can be related to illnesses such as X-Linked Agammaglobulinemia and Common Variable Immune Deficiency.

==== Secondary immunodeficiencies ====
Secondary immunodeficiencies, also known as acquired immunodeficiencies, can result from various immunosuppressive agents, for example, malnutrition, aging, particular medications (e.g., chemotherapy, disease-modifying antirheumatic drugs, immunosuppressive drugs after organ transplants, glucocorticoids) and environmental toxins like mercury and other heavy metals, pesticides and petrochemicals like styrene, dichlorobenzene, xylene, and ethylphenol. For medications, the term immunosuppression generally refers to both beneficial and potential adverse effects of decreasing the immune system's functions. The term immunodeficiency generally refers solely to the adverse effect of increased risk of infection.

Many specific diseases directly or indirectly cause immunosuppression. This includes many types of cancer, particularly those of the bone marrow and blood cells (leukemia, lymphoma, multiple myeloma), and certain chronic infections. Immunodeficiency is also the hallmark of acquired immunodeficiency syndrome (AIDS), caused by the human immunodeficiency virus (HIV). HIV directly infects a small number of T helper cells, and also impairs other immune system responses indirectly.

Various hormonal and metabolic disorders can also result in immune deficiency, including anemia, hypothyroidism, and hyperglycemia.

Smoking tobacco, heavy alcohol use, and substance use also depress the immune response.

Heavy schedules of training and competition in athletes increases their risk of immune deficiencies.

== Causes ==
The cause of immunodeficiency varies depending on the nature of the disorder. The cause can be either genetic or acquired by malnutrition and poor sanitary conditions. Only for some genetic causes, the exact genes are known.

== Immunodeficiency and autoimmunity ==
Several immunodeficiency syndromes present clinical and laboratory characteristics of autoimmunity. The decreased ability of the immune system to clear infections in these patients may be responsible for causing autoimmunity through perpetual immune system activation.

One example is common variable immunodeficiency (CVID), where multiple autoimmune diseases are seen, e.g., inflammatory bowel disease, autoimmune thrombocytopenia, and autoimmune thyroid disease. Familial hemophagocytic lymphohistiocytosis, an autosomal recessive primary immunodeficiency, is another example. Low blood levels of red blood cells, white blood cells, and platelets, rashes, lymph node enlargement, and enlargement of the liver and spleen are commonly seen in these patients. The presence of multiple uncleared viral infections due to a lack of perforin is thought to be responsible. In addition to chronic and/or recurrent infections, many autoimmune diseases, including arthritis, autoimmune hemolytic anemia, scleroderma, and type 1 diabetes, are also seen in X-linked agammaglobulinemia (XLA). Recurrent bacterial and fungal infections and chronic inflammation of the gut and lungs are seen in chronic granulomatous disease (CGD). CGD is caused by a decreased production of nicotinamide adenine dinucleotide phosphate (NADPH) oxidase by neutrophils.

Hypomorphic RAG mutations are seen in patients with midline granulomatous disease; an autoimmune disorder commonly occurring in patients with granulomatosis with polyangiitis and NK/T cell lymphomas. Wiskott–Aldrich syndrome (WAS) patients also present with eczema, autoimmune manifestations, recurrent bacterial infections, and lymphoma. In autoimmune polyendocrinopathy-candidiasis-ectodermal dystrophy (APECED), autoimmunity and infections coexist: organ-specific autoimmune manifestations (e.g., hypoparathyroidism and adrenocortical failure) and chronic mucocutaneous candidiasis. Finally, IgA deficiency is sometimes associated with developing autoimmune and atopic phenomena.

== Antibody vulnerability period in children ==
The period following birth is critical for the development of a child's immune system. Initially, a newborn relies heavily on passive immunity transferred from the mother, primarily through the placenta and breastfeeding.

As breastfeeding frequency declines, immune protection gradually wanes, making the child more vulnerable and increasingly reliant on their developing immune system. This transitional phase, known as the "antibody vulnerability period", lasts until approximately three to four years of age, during which the child's immune system matures and becomes fully functional.

To combat pathogens, babies need to develop their own specific antibodies recognizing these antigens. And these types of antibodies are known as immunoglobulins. Immunoglobulin G (IgG) is one of them.

Babies are unable to make their own IgG antibodies at birth and rely on maternal transfer of IgG via the placenta during the third trimester. Other types of immunoglobulins (IgA, IgM, IgE, and IgD) do not cross the placenta. It is believed that IgG is important in protecting babies against infections.

Naturally bioactive Immunoglobulin G is found in breast milk, which plays a significant role in early life during the vulnerable period. The Y-shaped structure of Immunoglobulin G allows it to effectively identify and combat pathogens, providing antibody-like protection to the child.

Research indicates that maintaining adequate IgG levels during early childhood may help mitigate the risks associated with this immune vulnerability. This supplementation can offer a protective boost, enhancing the infant's ability to fend off infections and other health threats during the critical years when their immune system is still developing. The importance of this period underscores the need for targeted nutritional interventions to support overall immune health in young children.

=== Classes of immunoglobulins (Igs) ===
The immune system produces several classes of immunoglobulins (Ig), such as IgA, IgD, IgE, IgG, and IgM. Each class helps protect the body from infection in a different way (see below).

=== Immunoglobulin Subclasses and Their Properties ===
Immunoglobulin Subclasses
Subclass	Structure	Antigen Binding Sites	Crosses Placenta	Total Antibody in Serum	Fc Binds to	Functions
IgM	Pentamer	10	No	6%	Complement	Main antibody of primary responses, best at fixing complement. Monomer form serves as B cell receptor.
IgG	Monomer	2	Yes	80%	Phagocytes	Main blood antibody of secondary responses, neutralize toxins, opsonization. All antibodies are Y-shaped; only some are dimers (sIgA) or pentamers (IgM). The Y-shaped structure has sites that effectively identify and bind pathogens. Able to suppress more than 99% of the antibody response against the bound antigen.
IgA	Dimer	4	No	13%	None	Secreted into mucus, tears, saliva, and colostrum.
IgE	Monomer	2	No	0.002%	Mast cells and basophils	Antibody of allergy and antiparasitic activity.
IgD	Monomer	2	No	1%	None	B-cell receptor.

== Treatment ==
Available treatment falls into two modalities: treating infections and boosting the immune system.

Prevention of Pneumocystis pneumonia with trimethoprim/sulfamethoxazole is useful in those who are immunocompromised. In the early 1950s, immunoglobulin (Ig) was used by doctors to treat patients with primary immunodeficiency through intramuscular injection. Ig replacement therapy infusions can be either subcutaneous or intravenously administered, resulting in higher Ig levels for about three to four weeks, although this varies with each patient.

== Prognosis ==
Prognosis depends greatly on the nature and severity of the condition. Some deficiencies cause early mortality (before age one), others, with or even without treatment, are lifelong conditions that cause little mortality or morbidity. Newer stem cell transplant technologies may lead to gene-based treatments of debilitating and fatal genetic immune deficiencies. The prognosis of acquired immune deficiencies depends on avoiding or treating the causative agent or condition (like AIDS).

== See also ==
- Acquired immune deficiency syndrome (AIDS)
- Immune disorder
  - Autoimmune disease, immune response to self-proteins
  - Allergy, immune response to harmless non-self proteins
    - Histamine
- Immunosenescence, age-associated immune deficiency
- Steroids, commonly administered drugs like prednisone that suppress the immune system
- Human genetic enhancement
- Immune system
- Immunology
