= X-linked agammaglobulinemia =

- Other names: X-linked hypogammaglobulinemia, Bruton type agammaglobulinemia, Bruton syndrome, sex-linked agammaglobulinemia
- The disorder is passed on in an X-linked recessive pattern
- Specialty: Immunology
- Frequency: 0.0005%

X-linked agammaglobulinemia (XLA) is a rare genetic disorder that affects the body's ability to fight infection due to the inability to create mature B cells, which produce antibodies. First described in 1952, it is a primary immunodeficiency caused by a mutation on X chromosome (Xq21.3-q22), making it X-linked and therefore much more common in males.

People with XLA are unable to produce an enzyme known as Bruton's tyrosine kinase, or Btk, which helps in the development of mature B cells via the white blood cell formation process. Btk is particularly responsible for mediating development at the pre-B cell to immature B cell stage through a signaling effect on the B cell receptor BCR. This manifests in an absence of proteins called gamma globulins, including antibodies, in the bloodstream, which reduces the body's humoral immunity response.

XLA sufferers typically present in early childhood with recurrent infections, in particular with extracellular, encapsulated bacteria. Serious and even fatal infections are common. XLA is deemed to have a relatively low incidence of disease, with an occurrence rate of approximately 1 in 200,000 live births and a frequency of about 1 in 100,000 male newborns. It has no ethnic predisposition. XLA is treated by infusion of human immunoglobulin. Treatment with pooled gamma globulin cannot restore a functional population of B cells, but it is sufficient to reduce the severity and number of infections due to the passive immunity granted by the exogenous antibodies.

== Signs and symptoms ==
Affects males 50% of the time if mother is a carrier for the gene. Children are generally asymptomatic until 6–9 months of age when maternal IgG decreases. Present with recurrent infections with Streptococcus pneumoniae, Haemophilus influenzae, Mycoplasma pneumoniae, hepatitis virus, and enterovirus CNS infections. Examination shows lymphoid hypoplasia (tonsils and adenoids, no splenomegaly or lymphadenopathy). There is significant decrease in all immunoglobulins.

== Genetics ==
X-chromosome

Most antibodies are gamma globulins. Antibodies are made mainly by plasma cells, which are daughter cells of the B cell line. The Btk enzyme plays an essential role in the maturation of B cells in the bone marrow, and when mutated, immature pro-B lymphocytes are unable to develop into pre-B lymphocytes, which normally develop into mature (naive) B cells that leave the bone marrow into the blood stream.

The disorder is inherited in an X-linked recessive fashion (as the gene linked to it is on the X chromosome) and is almost entirely limited to the sons of asymptomatic female carriers. This is because males have only one copy of the X chromosome, while females have two copies; one normal copy of an X chromosome can compensate for mutations in the other X chromosome, so they are less likely to be symptomatic.

There is 30–50% chance of XLA patients having a positive family history of genetic inheritance. The rest of the cases occur as random mutations. If a carrier female gives birth to a male child, there is a 50% chance that the male will have XLA. A carrier female has a 25% chance overall of giving birth to an affected male child. An XLA patient will pass on the gene, and all of his daughters will be XLA carriers, meaning that any male grandchildren from an XLA patient's daughters have a 50% chance of inheriting XLA. A female XLA patient can arise only as the child of an XLA patient and a carrier mother. XLA can also rarely result from a spontaneous mutation in the fetus of a non-carrier mother.

== Diagnosis ==
XLA diagnosis usually begins due to a history of recurrent infections, mostly in the respiratory tract, through childhood. This is due to humoral immunodeficiency. The diagnosis is probable when blood tests show the complete lack of circulating B cells (determined by the B cell marker CD19 and/or CD20), as well as low levels of all antibody classes, including IgG, IgA, IgM, IgE and IgD.

When XLA is suspected, it is possible to do a Western Blot test to determine whether the Btk protein is being expressed. Results of a genetic blood test confirm the diagnosis and will identify the specific Btk mutation, however its cost prohibits its use in routine screening for all pregnancies. Women with an XLA patient in their family should seek genetic counseling before pregnancy. Although the symptoms of a XLA and other primary immune diseases (PID) include repeated and often severe infections, the average time for a diagnosis of a PID can be up to 10 years.

== Management ==
The most common treatment for XLA is an intravenous infusion of immunoglobulin (IVIg, human IgG antibodies) every week, for life. IVIg is a human product extracted and pooled from thousands of blood donations. IVIg does not cure XLA but increases the patient's lifespan and quality of life, by generating passive immunity, and boosting the immune system. With treatment, the number and severity of infections is reduced. With IVIg, XLA patients may live a relatively healthy life. A patient should attempt reaching a state where his IgG blood count exceeds 800 mg/kg. The dose is based on the patient's weight and IgG blood-count.

Muscle injections of immunoglobulin (IMIg) were common before IVIg was prevalent, but are less effective and much more painful; hence, IMIg is now uncommon. Subcutaneous treatment (SCIg) was recently approved by the U.S. Food and Drug Administration (FDA), which is recommended in cases of severe adverse reactions to the IVIg treatment.

Antibiotics are another common supplementary treatment. Local antibiotic treatment (drops, lotions) are preferred over systemic treatment (pills) for long-term treatment, if possible. One of the future prospects of XLA treatment is gene therapy, which could potentially cure XLA. Gene therapy technology is still in its infancy and may cause severe complications such as cancer and even death. Moreover, the long-term success and complications of this treatment are, as yet, unknown.

=== Other considerations ===
It is not recommended and dangerous for XLA patients to receive live attenuated vaccines such as live polio, or the measles, mumps, rubella (MMR vaccine). Special emphasis is given to avoiding the oral live attenuated SABIN-type polio vaccine that has been reported to cause polio to XLA patients. Furthermore, it is not known if active vaccines in general have any beneficial effect on XLA patients as they lack normal ability to maintain immune memory.

XLA patients are specifically susceptible to viruses of the Enterovirus family, and mostly to: polio virus, coxsackie virus (hand, foot, and mouth disease) and Echoviruses. These may cause severe central nervous system conditions as chronic encephalitis, meningitis and death. An experimental anti-viral agent, pleconaril, is active against picornaviruses. XLA patients, however, are apparently immune to the Epstein-Barr virus (EBV), as they lack mature B cells (and so HLA co-receptors) needed for the viral infection. Patients with XLA are also more likely to have a history of septic arthritis.

It is not known if XLA patients are able to generate an allergic reaction, as they lack functional IgE antibodies. There is no special hazard for XLA patients in dealing with pets or outdoor activities. Unlike in other primary immunodeficiencies XLA patients are at no greater risk for developing autoimmune illnesses.

Agammaglobulinemia (XLA) is similar to the primary immunodeficiency disorder Hypogammaglobulinemia (CVID), and their clinical conditions and treatment are almost identical. However, while XLA is a congenital disorder, with known genetic causes, CVID may occur in adulthood and its causes are not yet understood. In addition, to X-linked agammaglobulinemia a couple of autosomal recessive agammaglobulinemia gene mutations have been described including mutations in IGHM, IGLL1, CD79A/B, BLNK and deletion of the deletion of the terminal 14q32.33 chromosom.

XLA was also historically mistaken as Severe Combined Immunodeficiency (SCID), a much more severe immune deficiency ("Bubble boys"). A strain of laboratory mouse, XID, is used to study XLA. These mice have a mutated version of the mouse Btk gene, and exhibit a similar, yet milder, immune deficiency as in XLA.

== History ==
XLA was the first described immune deficiency, being characterized by Dr. Ogden Bruton in a 1952 ground-breaking research paper describing a boy unable to develop immunities to common childhood diseases and infections.

== See also ==
- Hypogammaglobulinemia (CVID)
- Intravenous immunoglobulin (IVIg)
