= ICOS (gene) =

Protein found in humans

Identifiers
- Aliases: ICOS, AILIM, CD278, CVID1, inducible T-cell co-stimulator, inducible T-cell costimulator, inducible T cell costimulator
- External IDs: OMIM: 604558; MGI: 1858745; GeneCards: ICOS

Gene location (Human)
| Chr. | Chromosome 2 (human) |
| Band | 2q33.2 | Start | 203,936,763 bp |
| Band | 2q33.2 | End | 203,961,577 bp |

Gene location (Mouse)
| Chr. | Chromosome 1 (mouse) |
| Band | 1 C2|1 30.6 cM | Start | 61,017,086 bp |
| Band | 1 C2|1 30.6 cM | End | 61,039,479 bp |
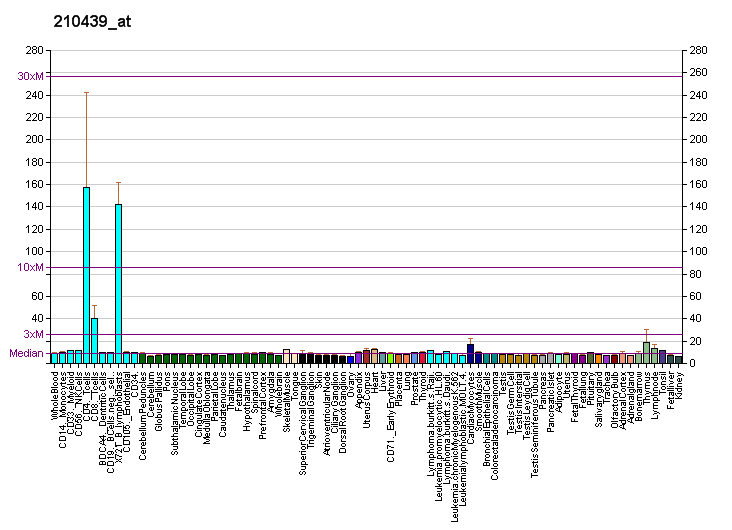
RNA expression pattern
| Bgee | Human / Mouse (ortholog); Top expressed in: lymph node; appendix; thymus; granulocyte; epithelium of nasopharynx; blood; testicle; superficial temporal artery; bone marrow; tonsil / Top expressed in: mesenteric lymph nodes; thymus; blood; embryo; Paneth cell; spleen; subcutaneous adipose tissue; submandibular gland; carotid body; medial ganglionic eminence; More reference expression data |
| BioGPS | More reference expression data |
Gene ontology
| Molecular function | phosphatidylinositol-4,5-bisphosphate 3-kinase activity; protein binding |
| Cellular component | integral component of membrane; extracellular region; plasma membrane; integral component of plasma membrane; membrane; external side of plasma membrane |
| Biological process | T cell tolerance induction; T cell costimulation; immune response; phosphatidylinositol phosphate biosynthetic process; cell-cell adhesion; positive regulation of protein kinase B signaling |
Sources:Amigo / QuickGO
Orthologs
| Databases | NCBI: entry; OMA: entry |
| Species | Human | Mouse |
| Entrez | 29851 | 54167 |
| Ensembl | ENSG00000163600 | ENSMUSG00000026009 |
| UniProt | Q9Y6W8 | Q9WVS0 |
| RefSeq (mRNA) | NM_012092 | NM_017480 |
| RefSeq (protein) | NP_036224 | NP_059508 |
| Location (UCSC) | Chr 2: 203.94 – 203.96 Mb | Chr 1: 61.02 – 61.04 Mb |
| PubMed search |
- Wikidata
| View/Edit Human | View/Edit Mouse |

Inducible T-cell costimulator (also called CD278) is an immune checkpoint protein that in humans is encoded by the ICOS (Inducible T-cell COStimulator) gene. The protein belongs to the CD28 and CTLA-4 cell-surface receptor family. These are proteins expressed on the surface of immune cells that mediate signalling between them. A surface protein, the ligand, binds specifically to its receptor on another cell, leading to a signalling cascade in that cell.

== Function ==
ICOS is a receptor protein expressed on the surface of activated T cells. Its ligand ICOS-L (previously called B7RP-1) is constitutively expressed on B cells. Stimulation of the ICOS receptor on T cells by ICOS-L on B cells is required for the development of follicular helper T (Tfh) cells. ICOS forms homodimers and plays an important role in cell-cell signaling, immune responses and regulation of cell proliferation.

== Knockout phenotype ==
Compared to wild-type naïve T cells, ICOS-/- T cells activated with plate-bound anti-CD3 have reduced proliferation and IL-2 secretion. The defect in proliferation can be rescued by addition of IL-2 to the culture, suggesting the proliferative defect is due either to ICOS-mediated IL-2 secretion or the activation of similar signaling pathways between ICOS and IL-2. In terms of Th1 and Th2 cytokine secretion, ICOS-/- CD4+ T cell activated in vitro reduced IL-4 secretion, while maintaining similar IFN-g secretion. Similarly, CD4+ T cells purified from ICOS-/- mice immunized with the protein keyhole limpet hemocyanin (KLH) in alum or complete Freund's Adjuvant have attenuated IL-4 secretion, but similar IFN-g and IL-5 secretion when recalled with KLH.

These data are similar to an airway hypersensitivity model showing similar IL-5 secretion, but reduced IL-4 secretion in response to sensitization with Ova protein, indicating a defect in Th2 cytokine secretion, but not a defect in Th1 differentiation as both IL-4 and IL-5 are Th2-associated cytokines. In agreement with reduced Th2 responses, ICOS-/- mice expressed reduced germinal center formation and IgG1 and IgE antibody titers in response to immunization.

== Combination therapy ==
Ipilimumab patients expressed increased ICOS+ T cells in tumor tissues and blood. The increase served as a pharmacodynamic biomarker of anti-CTLA-4 treatment. In wild-type C57BL/6 mice, anti-CTLA-4 treatment resulted in tumor rejection in 80 to 90% of subjects, but in gene-targeted mice that were deficient for either ICOS or its ligand (ICOSLG), the efficacy was less than 50%. An agonistic stimulus for the ICOS pathway during anti-CTLA-4 therapy resulted in an increase in efficacy that was about four to five times as large as that of control treatments. This combination therapy incorporating ICOS costimulation and CTLA-4 blockade effectively remodels tumor-associated macrophages (TAMs) towards an antitumor phenotype, demonstrating promising therapeutic potential in cancer treatment. As of 2015 antibodies for ICOS were not available for clinical testing.
