= Common variable immunodeficiency =

Immune disorder

- Specialty: Immunology
- Symptoms: recurrent opportunistic infections; fatigue; gastrointestinal issues; Hypogammaglobulinemia
- Complications: Autoimmune manifestations; increased risk of malignancies such as gastric carcinomas, non-Hodgkin lymphoma; lymphocytic infiltration of tissues; nodular regenerative hyperplasia; enteropathy
- Usual onset: Varies; typically between age 20-40
- Duration: Lifelong
- Types: CVID1, CVID2, CVID3, CVID4, CVID5, CVID6
- Causes: Unknown; around 10% have an identified heterogeneous gene mutation and/or inheritance of mutations
- Diagnostic method: Exclusion of other possible causes of hypogammaglobulinemia
- Differential diagnosis: Varies by age group Age <4: leaky SCID, transient hypogammaglobulinemia of infancy, XLP, XLA, hyper-IgM syndromes, myelodysplastic syndromes, Wiskott-Aldrich syndrome, rare combined immune deficiencies, cystic fibrosis, HIV; Age 5–55: loss of immunoglobulin due to renal/gut disease; side effects of medications (particularly anticonvulsants and anti-rheumatics); Age >56: thymoma, lymphoid malignancies, side effects of medications (particularly anticonvulsants and anti-rheumatics), loss of immunoglobulin due to renal/gut disease
- Treatment: Immunoglobulin replacement therapy, symptom management
- Prognosis: Varies; studies find early diagnosis and treatment result in positive outcomes and little or no reduced life expectancy, and conversely, each year of delayed diagnosis increases mortality risk by 4%.
- Frequency: 1 in 30,000

Common variable immunodeficiency (CVID) is a primary immunodeficiency, characterized by recurrent infections and low antibody levels, specifically in immunoglobulin (Ig) types IgG, IgM, and IgA. The most common sign of CVID is frequent infections, most commonly in the lungs, sinuses, and ears. Other symptoms include autoimmune conditions, gastrointestinal problems, and complications from recurrent infections, including chronic lung disease and enlarged lymph nodes. The term "variable" refers to the heterogeneous manifestations of this disorder where symptoms vary greatly between people.

While CVID can appear anywhere from age 4 in to late adulthood, most people are diagnosed between ages 20 and 45. It affects people equally regardless of gender or race. CVID is a lifelong disease. Most patients are treated with IgG replacement therapy at frequent intervals for life.

== Signs and complications ==
The symptoms of CVID vary between those affected. Its main features are hypogammaglobulinemia and recurrent infections. Hypogammaglobulinemia manifests as a significant decrease in the levels of IgG antibodies, usually alongside IgA antibodies; IgM antibody levels are also decreased in about half of those affected.

=== Infectious complications ===
People with common variable immunodeficiency have trouble fighting off infections due to the lack of antibodies produced, which normally resist invading microbes. Infections are also the leading cause of morbidity and mortality in CVID patients. Due to impaired antibody development, vaccination is not effective for CVID patients.

The prevalence of bacterial complications (42%) is higher in comparison to viral (25%), parasitic (19%) or fungal (3%). Recurring bacterial infections are generally found in the upper and lower areas of the respiratory tract and in gastrointestinal tract. Many who have a recurring lung infection report developing chronic lung diseases and potentially life-threatening complications later in life.

Common infections include:

- Pneumonia
- Ear infections
- Sinusitis
- Chronic coughing (lasting from a few weeks to many months)
- Gastrointestinal infections

The microorganisms that most frequently cause infections in CVID are Haemophilus influenzae, Streptococcus pneumoniae, and Staphylococcus aureus. Pathogens less often isolated from those affected include Neisseria meningitidis, Pseudomonas aeruginosa, respectively Giardia lamblia, Salmonella sp., Campylobacter jejuni for gastrointestinal tract.

Infections mostly affect the respiratory tract (nose, sinuses, bronchi, lungs) and the gastrointestinal tract; they can also occur at other sites, such as the eyes, skin, and ears. These infections respond to antibiotics but can recur upon discontinuation of antibiotics. Bronchiectasis can develop when severe, recurrent pulmonary infections are left untreated.

Gastrovascular infections or inflammation are very common for those with CVID. Signs of a gastrovascular infection include abdominal pain, nausea, bloating, vomiting, diarrhea, and weight loss. Many individuals with CVID have an impaired ability to absorb nutrients, including vitamins, proteins, minerals, fats, and sugar, within the digestive tract.

=== Autoimmune disorders ===
CVID is frequently associated with a variety of autoimmune diseases. They could present as the first or the only clinical manifestation of the disease. The reported prevalence of autoimmunity ranged from 14% to 54% in CVID patients and is higher for females. The most common autoimmune disorders observed in CVID are autoimmune cytopenia, idiopathic thrombocytopenic purpura (ITP), AIHA and neutropenia. Furthermore, autoimmune endocrinological (insulin-dependent diabetes, autoimmune thyroiditis), gastrointestinal (anemia, autoimmune enteropathy), dermatological (psoriasis, vitiligo) and rheumatological disorders were described in CVID too.

The reason for such a high prevalence of autoimmunity in CVID individuals is not fully understood. CVID patients with autoimmunity show decreased number of immunosuppressive regulatory T cells (Treg) and impaired selection process of self-reactive antibodies, suggesting the possible mechanism.

=== Malignancy and CVID ===
The patients with CVID have a risk 5 to 12 times higher than the general population. The most frequent malignancies are Non-Hodgkin lymphoma (NHL), gastric carcinoma and leukemia.

=== Enteropathy ===
There is a wide spectrum of noninfectious gastrointestinal pathology and inflammation in CVID that is a part of the general immune dysregulation affecting patients with CVID.

The most common upper gastrointestinal inflammation is chronic gastritis, which may in rare cases develop to gastric cancer, and duodenal inflammation resembling celiac disease. The inflammation affecting the lower GI tract is heterogenous and often characterized as an unspecific colitis.

Recent studies have suggested a role of gut microbiota in the etiology of CVID, and the reduction of mucosal IgA in CVID enteropathy. The heterogenous group of patients makes it difficult to find common grounds for treatment for the GI inflammation in CVID.

=== Other complications ===
Due to changes in B cell development, some individuals with CVID have accumulations of lymphocytes in lymphoid tissues. This can cause mild to severely swollen lymph nodes or inflammation of the spleen.

Lymphocytic infiltration to tissues may cause enlargement of lymph nodes (lymphadenopathy), of the spleen (splenomegaly), and of the liver (hepatomegaly), as well as the formation of granulomas. In the lung, this is known as granulomatous–lymphocytic interstitial lung disease.

Anxiety and depression can occur as a result of dealing with the other symptoms.

CVID patients generally complain of severe fatigue.

== Pathogenesis of CVID ==
=== Genetic defects ===
The causative factors of CVID are not fully known. Genetic mutations can be identified as the cause of disease in about 10% of people, while familial inheritance accounts for 10–25% of cases. Rather than arising from a single genetic mutation, CVID seems to result from a variety of mutations that all contribute to a failure in antibody production.

Mutations in the genes encoding ICOS, TACI, CD19, CD20, CD21, CD80, and BAFFR have been identified as causative of CVID. Susceptibility to CVID may also be linked to the major histocompatibility complex (MHC) of the genome, particularly to DR-DQ haplotypes. A mutation in the NFKB2 gene has recently been shown to cause CVID-like symptoms in a murine model. The frequency of this NFKB2 mutation in the CVID population is, however, yet to be established.

The examples of molecular defects in CVID
Molecule	Role in CVID
Surface molecules
TACI	B-cell activation defect and autoimmunity
BAFF-R	Low peripheral B-cell numbers, decreased antibody responses
CD27	Hypogammaglobulinemia, absent memory B cells
CD19 complex (CD19,CD81, CD21)	Impaired BCR signaling
IL-21R and IL-21	Impaired germinal center formation, impaired class-switch process and plasma cell differentiation
CTLA-4	Impaired function of Treg cells
ICOS	Reduced B cell counts and low levels of antibodies
Cytosolic molecules
PKC-delta	Decreased number of memory B cells
PLC-gamma-2	Defective BCR signaling
PI3K	Impaired B and T cell homeostasis
ZAP70	Impaired T cell function
TLR7 and TLR9	Defects in B cells activation in response to TLRs ligands
Nuclear defects
STAT1	Hypogammaglobulinemia, reduced number of memory and plasma cells
NF-κB	Impaired B cell maturation, differentiation and class switching

=== Epigenetic factors ===
Several recent studies have described a potential role of epigenetics factor (including DNA methylation, chromatin and histone modulation and also non-coding RNAs) in pathogenesis of CVID.

=== Immune cell abnormalities ===
There are several abnormalities described in CVID patients connected to the count of particular cell (sub)populations.

The majority of CVID patients have normal B cell counts, suggesting the impaired antibody production is mainly a defect in the differentiation process of B cells into memory and plasma cells.

There are also T cell abnormalities in CVID including counts, percentages, surface markers and function differences.

The examples of possible immune cell population changes in CVID
Population	Change
B cells
Memory B (CD19+CD27+)	decreased
Plasma cells	decreased
Transitional B cells	increased
CD21low B cells	increased
T cells
Naive CD4+	decreased
Memory CD4+	increased
Naive CD8+	decreased
Memory CD8+	increased

== Diagnosis ==
According to a European registry study, the mean age at onset of symptoms was 26.3 years old. As per the criteria laid out by ESID (European Society for Immunodeficiencies) and PAGID (Pan-American Group for Immunodeficiency), CVID is diagnosed if:

- the person presents with a marked decrease in serum IgG levels (<4.5 g/L) and a marked decrease below the lower limit of normal for age in at least one of the isotypes IgM or IgA;
- the person is four years of age or older;
- the person lacks an antibody immune response to protein antigens or immunization.

Diagnosis is chiefly by exclusion, i.e., alternative causes of hypogammaglobulinemia, such as X-linked agammaglobulinemia, must be excluded before a diagnosis of CVID can be made.

Diagnosis is difficult because of the diversity of phenotypes seen in people with CVID. For example, serum immunoglobulin levels in people with CVID vary greatly. Generally, people can be grouped as follows: no immunoglobulin production, immunoglobulin (Ig) M production only, or both normal IgM and IgG production. Additionally, B cell numbers are also highly variable. 12% of people have no detectable B cells, 12% have reduced B cells, and 54% are within the normal range. In general, people with CVID display higher frequencies of naive B cells and lower frequencies of class-switched memory B cells. Frequencies of other B cell populations, such as IgD memory B cells, transitional B cells, and CD21 B cells, are also affected and are associated with specific disease features.

Although CVID is often thought of as a serum immunoglobulin- and B cell-mediated disease, T cells can display abnormal behavior. Affected individuals typically present with low frequencies of CD4^{+}, a T-cell marker, and decreased circulation of regulatory T cells and iNKT cells. Notably, approximately 10% of people display CD4^{+} T cell counts lower than 200 cells/mm^{3}; this particular phenotype of CVID has been named LOCID (Late Onset Combined Immunodeficiency) and has a poorer prognosis than classical CVID.

=== Types ===
The following types of CVID have been named, and correspond to mutations in different gene segments:

Type	OMIM	Gene
CVID1	607594	ICOS
CVID2	240500	TACI
CVID3	613493	CD19
CVID4	613494	TNFRSF13C
CVID5	613495	CD20
CVID6	613496	CD81

== Treatment ==
Treatment options are limited and usually include lifelong immunoglobulin replacement therapy. This therapy is thought to help reduce bacterial infections. This treatment alone is not wholly effective, and many people still experience other symptoms such as lung disease and noninfectious inflammatory symptoms. This treatment replenishes Ig subtypes that the person lacks, is given at frequent intervals for life, and is thought to help reduce bacterial infections and boost immune function. Before therapy begins, plasma donations are tested for known blood-borne pathogens, then pooled and processed to obtain concentrated IgG samples. Infusions can be administered in three different forms: intravenously (IVIg), subcutaneously (SCIg), and intramuscularly (IMIg).

The administration of intravenous immunoglobulins requires the insertion of a cannula or needle in a vein, usually in the arms or hands. Because a highly concentrated product is used, IVIg infusions take place every three to four weeks. Subcutaneous infusions slowly release the Ig serum underneath the skin, again through a needle, and take place every week. Intramuscular infusions are no longer widely used, as they can be painful and are more likely to cause reactions.

People often experience adverse side effects from immunoglobulin infusions, including:

- swelling at the insertion site (common in SCIG)
- chills
- headache
- nausea (common in IVIG)
- fatigue (common in IVIG)
- muscle aches and pain, or joint pain
- fever (common in IVIG and rare in SCIG)
- hives (rare)
- thrombotic events (rare)
- aseptic meningitis (rare, more common in people with SLE)
- anaphylactic shock (very rare)

In addition to Ig replacement therapy, treatment may also involve immune suppressants to control autoimmune symptoms of the disease and high-dose steroids like corticosteroids. In some cases, antibiotics are used to fight chronic lung disease resulting from CVID. The outlook for people varies greatly depending on their level of lung and other organ damage prior to diagnosis and treatment.

== Epidemiology ==
CVID has an estimated prevalence of about 1:50,000 in Caucasians. The disease seems to be less prevalent among Asians and African Americans. Males and females are equally affected; however, among children, boys predominate. A recent study of people in Europe with primary immunodeficiencies found that 30% had CVID as opposed to a different immunodeficiency. 10–25% of people inherit the disease, typically through autosomal-dominant inheritance. Given the rarity of the disease, it is not yet possible to generalize about its prevalence among ethnic and racial groups.

CVID shortens the lifespan, but no study currently has a median age recorded. One study suggests the median age of death for men and women is 42 and 44 years old, respectively, but most patients involved in the study are still alive. Those people with accompanying disorders had the worst prognosis (50% survival 33 years after diagnosis), and those with only CVID-caused frequent infections had the longest survival rates, with another study stating a life expectancy almost equaling that of the general UK population. Additionally, people with CVID with one or more noninfectious complications have an 11 times higher risk of death as compared to people with only infections.

== History ==
Immunodeficiencies comprise many diseases and are genetic defects affecting the immune system. There are roughly 150 immunodeficiencies spanning over 120 genetic defects. Charles Janeway Sr. is generally credited with the first description of a case of CVID in 1953. The case involved a 39-year-old who had recurrent infections, bronchiectasis, and meningitis. CVID has since emerged as the predominant class of primary antibody deficiencies. It is thought to affect between 1 in 25,000 to 1 in 50,000 people worldwide.

Though described in 1953, there was no standard definition for CVID until the 1990s, which caused widespread confusion during diagnosis. During the 1990s, the European Society for Immunodeficiency (ESID) and Pan-American Group for Immunodeficiency (PAGID) developed diagnostic criteria for the disease, including the minimum age of diagnosis and the need to exclude other conditions. Since publication in 1999, some criteria have been changed, such as increasing the minimum age of diagnosis.

== Research ==
Current research is aimed at studying large cohorts of people with CVID in an attempt to better understand the age of onset as well as the mechanism, genetic factors, and progression of the disease.

Funding for research in the US is provided by the National Institutes of Health. Key research in the UK was previously funded by the Primary Immunodeficiency Association (PiA) until its closure in January 2012, and funding is raised through the annual Jeans for Genes campaign. Current efforts are aimed at studying the following:

- Causes of complications. Little is known about why such diverse complications arise during treatment.
- Underlying genetic factors. Though many polymorphisms and mutations have been identified, their respective roles in CVID development are poorly understood and not represented in all people with CVID.
- Finding new ways to study CVID. Given that CVID arises from more than one gene, gene knock-out methods are unlikely to be helpful. It is necessary to seek out disease-related polymorphisms by screening large populations of people with CVID, but this is challenging given the rarity of the disease.
