= Hypogammaglobulinemia =

Human disease

- Specialty: Hematology

Hypogammaglobulinemia is an immune system disorder in which not enough gamma globulins are produced in the blood (thus hypo- + gamma + globulin + -emia). This results in a lower antibody count, which impairs the immune system, increasing risk of infection. Hypogammaglobulinemia may result from a variety of primary genetic immune system defects, such as common variable immunodeficiency, or it may be caused by secondary effects such as medication, blood cancer, or poor nutrition, or loss of gamma globulins in urine, as in nonselective glomerular proteinuria. Patients with hypogammaglobulinemia have reduced immune function; important considerations include avoiding use of live vaccines, and take precautionary measures when traveling to regions with endemic disease or poor sanitation such as receiving immunizations, taking antibiotics abroad, drinking only safe or boiled water, arranging appropriate medical cover in advance of travel, and ensuring continuation of any immunoglobulin infusions needed.

== Types ==
The following lists types of "agammaglobulinemia" catalogued in the OMIM. Hypogammaglobulinemia can have other types; see sections "Causes" and "Etymology" below.

Type	OMIM	Gene
AGM1	601495	IGHM
AGM2	613500	IGLL1
AGM3	613501	CD79A
AGM4	613502	BLNK
AGM5	613506	LRRC8A
AGM6	612692	CD79B

== Symptoms and signs ==
The presenting feature of hypogammaglobulinemia is usually a clinical history of recurrent, chronic, or atypical infections. These infections include but are not limited to: bronchitis, ear infections, meningitis, pneumonia, sinus infections, and skin infections. Such infections can potentially damage organs, leading to severe complications. Other symptoms of hypogammaglobulinemia include chronic diarrhea and complications from receiving live vaccines. Certain symptoms of chronic damage may be related to recurrent infection. For example, shortness of breath, chronic cough, and sputum production may indicate the presence of bronchiectasis. Sinus pain, nasal discharge, and postnasal drip may indicate the presence of chronic sinusitis. Diarrhea and steatorrhea may indicate malabsorption. Another sign or symptom that may occur in patients is blotchiness of the skin color, especially noticed above the waist, on the arms, neck, and upper chest areas, however, it may occur anywhere on the skin.

Babies with transient hypogammaglobulinemia (THI) usually become symptomatic 6 to 12 months after birth, with the symptoms usually consisting of frequent ear, sinus, and lung infections. Other symptoms include respiratory tract infections, food allergies, eczema, urinary tract infections, and intestinal infections.

== Causes ==
Hypogammaglobulinemia can be caused by either a primary or secondary immunodeficiency. Primary immunodeficiencies are caused by a mutation or series of mutations to the genome. For example, a study from 2012 found that a compound heterozygous deleterious mutation in the CD21 gene is associated with hypogammaglobulinemia. Genetic analysis revealed the patient was heterozygous for CD21, with the paternally inherited allele (also shared with one sister) having a disrupted splicing donor site at exon 6, while the maternally inherited allele had a mutation resulting in a premature stop codon in exon 13. Neither mutation was found in 100 healthy control subjects, showing the rarity of the mutations.

Around 300 different genes have been identified which account for different forms of primary immunodeficiency (PID). These different forms can affect different parts of the immune system, including immunoglobulin production. Primary immunodeficiencies usually have a delay of several years between initial clinical presentation and diagnosis. Some primary immune deficiencies include ataxia-telangiectasia (A-T), autosomal recessive agammaglobulinemia (ARA), common variable immunodeficiency (CVID), hyper-IgM syndromes, IgG subclass deficiency, isolated non-IgG immunoglobulin deficiencies, severe combined immunodeficiency (SCID), specific antibody deficiency (SAD), Wiskott-Aldrich syndrome, or X-linked agammaglobulinemia. CVID is the most common form of primary immunodeficiency. SCID is considered a medical emergency and suspected cases require immediate specialist center referral for diagnosis and treatment.

It is more often that hypogammaglobulinemia develops as a result of another condition, which are called secondary or acquired immune deficiencies. These include blood cancers such as chronic lymphocytic leukemia (CLL), lymphoma, or myeloma, HIV, nephrotic syndrome, poor nutrition, protein-losing enteropathy, getting an organ transplant, or radiation therapy. This also includes medications which can cause hypogammaglobulinemia, such as corticosteroids, chemotherapy drugs, or antiseizure medication.

== Screening ==
Screening of immunoglobulin levels in relatives of CVID and IgA patients finds a familial inheritance rate of 10% to 20%. In cases where a carrier of such a mutation would like to have children, preimplantation genetic diagnosis (PGD) has been offered. PGD is defined as the testing of pre-implantation stage embryos or oocytes for genetic defects. It requires in vitro fertilization, embryo biopsy, and either fluorescent in situ hybridization or polymerase chain reaction on a singular cell, making it a complex procedure. While some question the ethicality of such artificial selection, it is generally seen as an important alternative to prenatal diagnosis. Prevention of secondary immunodeficiency involves monitoring patients carefully with high risk of developing hypogammaglobulinemia. This entails measuring immunoglobulin levels in patients with hematologic malignancy, or those receiving chemotherapy or immunosuppressive therapy such as rituximab.

== Treatment ==
Protocols for different forms of primary immunodeficiency vary significantly. The aim of treatments implemented by specialist centers is usually to reduce the risk of complications. One method of treatment is by parenteral administration of gamma globulins, either monthly intravenously, subcutaneously, or more recently, by weekly self-administered hypodermoclysis. In either case, mild allergic reactions are common, and are usually manageable with oral diphenhydramine. Evidence comparing immunoglobulin replacement with no treatment is limited, and guidelines for treatment are therefore mainly derived from observational studies. Antibiotics are also frequently used as treatment. Other standard forms of treatment include a form of enzyme replacement therapy called PEG-ADA, and antibiotic treatment given for the prevention of Pneumocystis pneumonia.

One emerging therapy is hematopoietic stem cell transplantation, which has been considered standard treatment for many combined primary immunodeficiencies including SCID, CD40 deficiency, CD40 ligand deficiency, and Wiskott-Aldrich syndrome, but has been extended to secondary immunodeficiencies over the last two decades. Another emerging therapy is gene therapy, which has been used to treat X-linked SCID, SCID due to adenosine deaminase deficiency, and chronic granulomatous disease.

== Prognosis ==
Early detection and treatment of hypogammaglobulinemia is known to reduce rates of morbidity and the chance of long-term pulmonary complications. Evidence shows that there is an association between achieving higher IgG levels and reduced infection frequency. If hypogammaglobulinemia remains undetected and untreated, outcomes are generally poor, especially if chronic lung damage or bronchiectasis has occurred. Unfortunately, the diagnosis of hypogammaglobulinemia is often significantly delayed.

== Research ==
In 2015, a journal article by McDermott et al. reported on a case in which chromothripsis, normally a catastrophic event in which chromosomes undergo massive deletion and rearrangement within a single stem cell's DNA, cured a patient with WHIM syndrome, a primary immunodeficiency disease. WHIM is autosomal dominant and is caused by a gain-of-function mutation of the chemokine receptor CXCR4. The mutation in CXCR4 increases signaling because it disrupts negative regulatory elements usually present, creating exaggerated functions of the receptor. The term "WHIM" is an acronym for the main manifestations of the disease: warts, hypogammaglobulinemia, recurrent infections, and myelokathexis. Myelokathexis is impaired escape of mature neutrophils from bone marrow, causing neutropenia. Patients with WHIM syndrome have severely reduced peripheral blood B cells and some reduction in peripheral blood T cells and monocytes (McDermott). The cured patient, designated WHIM-09, is a white female presented at age 58. She also presented with her two daughters, WHIM-10 (age 21) and WHIM-11 (age 23). Both daughters fulfilled all of the clinical criteria for WHIM syndrome, while WHIM-09 did not. She reported that she had had many serious infections from childhood until age 38 but had had none in the past 20 years. She has fulfilled none of the criteria for WHIM syndrome except for mild hypogammaglobulinemia since then. WHIM-09 was the first patient ever described with myelokathexis, the "M" in WHIM syndrome, and her parents and siblings showed no sign of the syndrome. Therefore, the evidence is compatible with a WHIM mutation occurring de novo in patient WHIM-09, an autosomal dominant transition to two of her three daughters, and a spontaneous and complete remission in WHIM-09. This provides the first evidence that chromothripsis may result in clinical benefit, in particular, the cure of a genetic disease. If a cell with chromothripsis dies, it is clinically undetectable, making the true frequency of its occurrence hard to determine. Therefore, it is only detected if it acquires a strong selective advantage creating a clinically apparent clonal population harboring the same pattern of deletions and arrangements. This results in either cancer, or if the location is fortuitous, the cure of a genetic condition as occurred in patient WHIM-09.

=== Effect on viral evolution ===
One study of the genomic variation in the hepatitis C virus in patients with and without hypogammaglobulinemia found that patients with hypogammaglobulinemia had fewer nucleotide substitutions per year than the control patients, suggesting that in the absence of selective pressure caused by the immune system, the frequency of the occurrence of genetic variation in the major viral species is reduced. They used five control patients and four patients with CVID, a particularly severe form of hypogammaglobulinemia. The control patients had a mean nucleotide rate-of-change of 6.954 nucleotide substitutions per year while the patients with CVID had 0.415 nucleotide substitutions per year. While the mutations still occur in the patients with CVID, they tend to remain as a minor species in the absence of immune selection.

== Terminology ==
"Hypogammaglobulinemia" is largely synonymous with "agammaglobulinemia". When the latter term is used (as in "X-linked agammaglobulinemia") it implies that gamma globulins are not merely reduced, but completely absent. Modern assays have allowed most agammaglobulinemias to be more precisely defined as hypogammaglobulinemias, but the distinction is not usually clinically relevant.

"Hypogammaglobulinemia" is distinguished from dysgammaglobulinemia, which is a reduction in some types of gamma globulins, but not others.
