= List of autoimmune diseases =

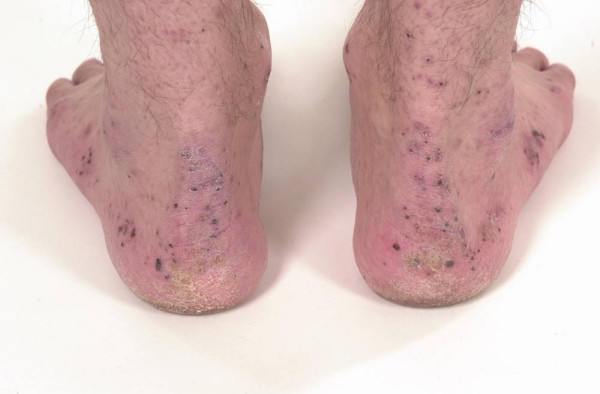
Dermatosis in Crohn's disease

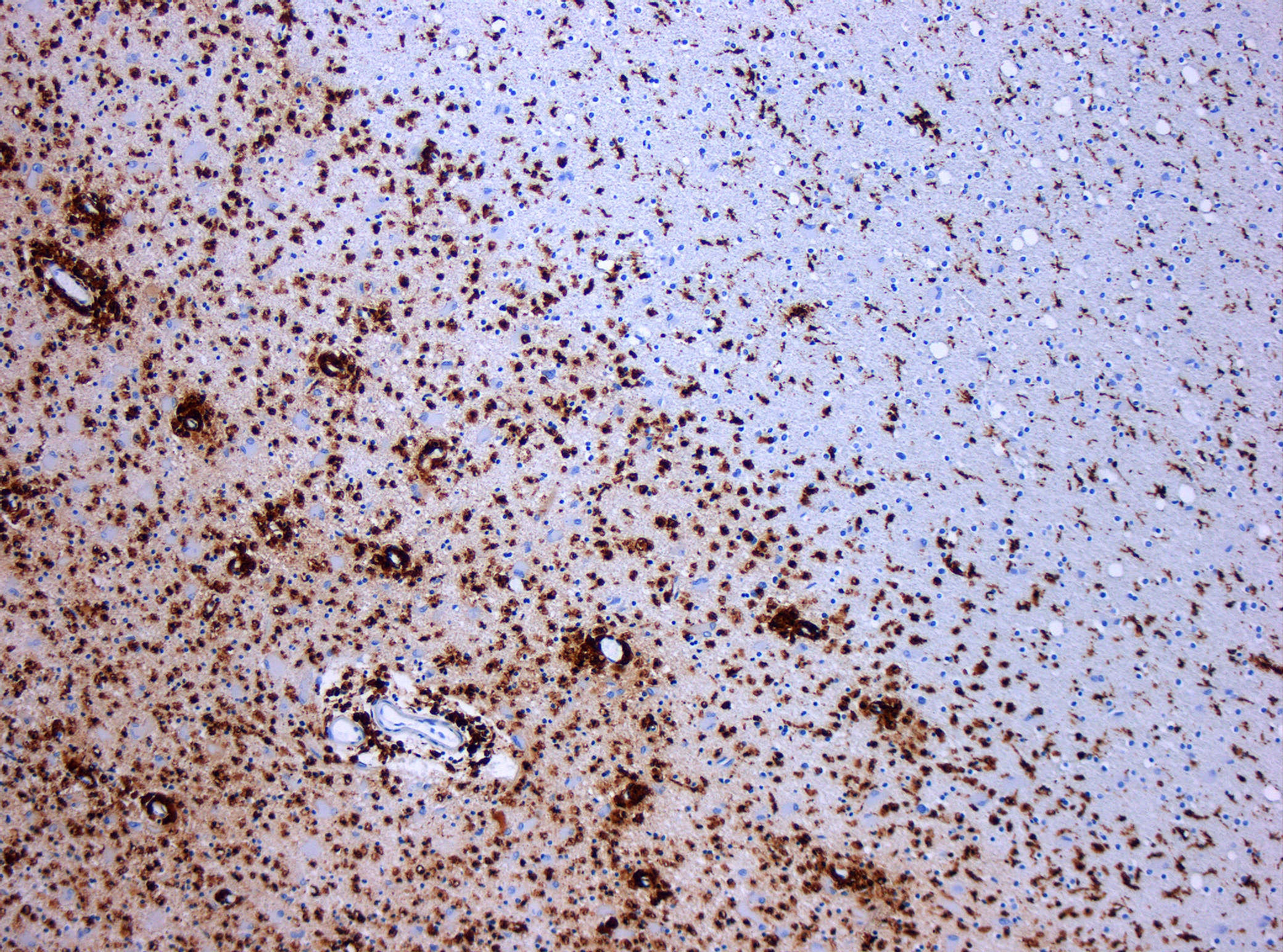
Demyelination in MS

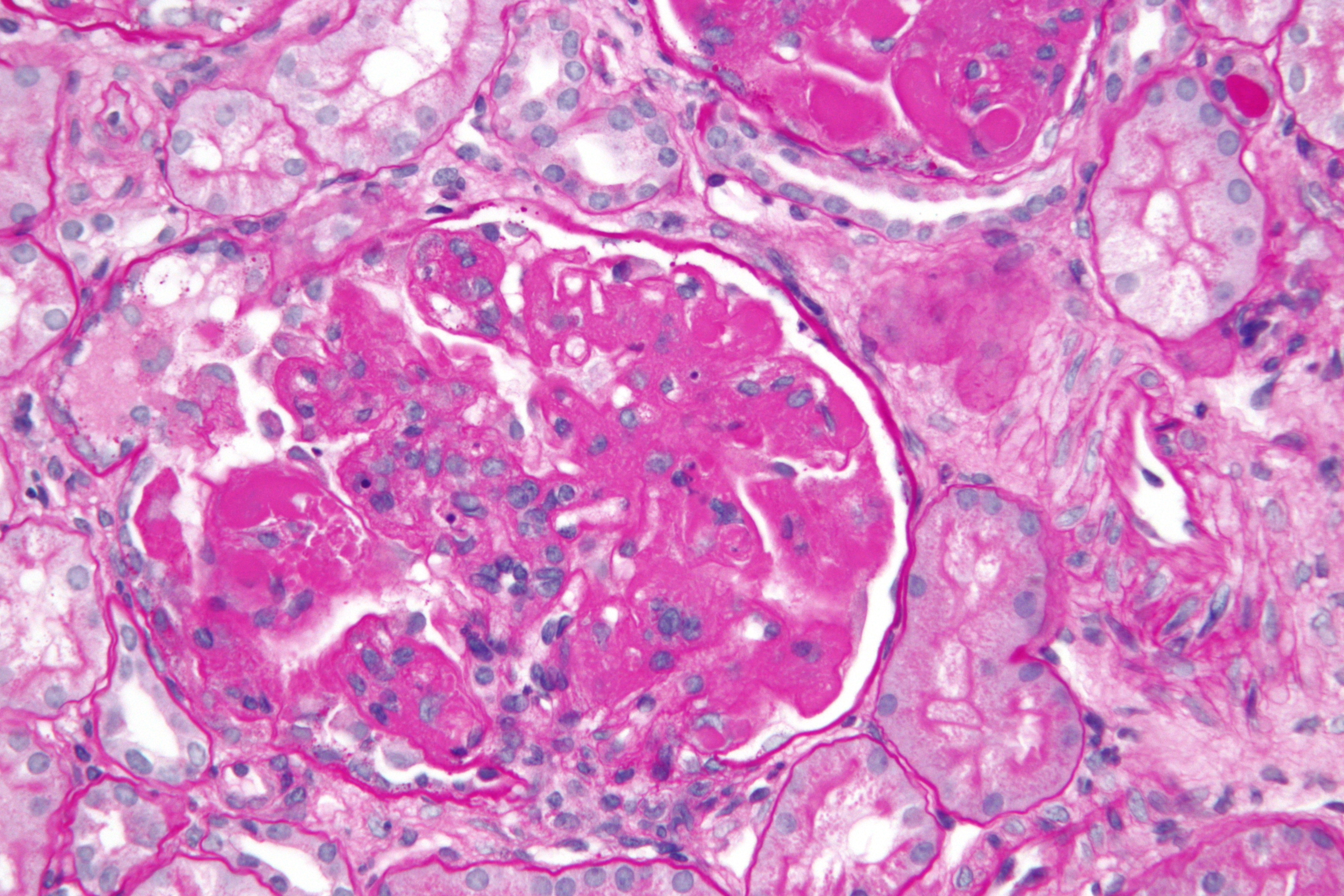
PAS stain of lupus nephritis

Autoimmune urticaria

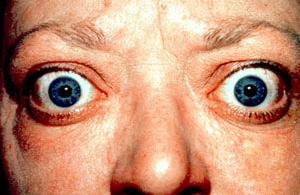
Proptosis in Graves' disease

This article provides a list of autoimmune diseases. These conditions, where the body's immune system mistakenly attacks its own cells, affect a range of organs and systems within the body. Each disorder is listed with the primary organ or body part that it affects and the associated autoantibodies that are typically found in people diagnosed with the condition. Each disorder is also categorized by its acceptance as an autoimmune condition into four levels: confirmed, probable, possible, and uncertain. This classification is based on the current scientific consensus and reflects the level of evidence supporting the autoimmune nature of the disorder. Lastly, the prevalence rate, specifically in the United States, is included to give a sense of how common each disorder is within the population.

- Confirmed – Used for conditions that have strong, well-established evidence of autoimmune etiology.
- Probable – Used for conditions where there is substantial evidence of autoimmune involvement, but the scientific consensus may not be as strong as for those in the 'confirmed' category.
- Possible – Used for conditions that have some evidence pointing towards autoimmune involvement, but it's not yet clear or there is ongoing debate.
- Uncertain – Used for conditions where the evidence of autoimmune involvement is limited or contested.

== Integumentary system ==
The integumentary system, composed of the skin, hair, nails, and associated glands, serves as a protective barrier between the body and the environment. It also plays a critical role in regulating body temperature and maintaining fluid balance.

Disease	Primary organ/body part affected	Autoantibodies	Acceptance as an autoimmune disease	Prevalence rate (US)	Cit.
Alopecia areata	Hair follicles	None specific	Confirmed	2.1%	
Autoimmune angioedema	Skin	C1 inhibitor	Probable	Less than 5,000	
Autoimmune progesterone dermatitis	Skin	Progesterone	Probable	Extremely rare	
Autoimmune urticaria	Skin	IgG against IgE or IgE receptor	Probable	Not well established	
Bullous pemphigoid	Skin	Anti-BP180, Anti-BP230	Confirmed	6-30 per 100,000 (mostly older adults)	
Cicatricial pemphigoid	Mucous membranes, sometimes skin	Anti-BP180, Anti-BP230	Confirmed	Rare	
Dermatitis herpetiformis	Skin	Anti-tissue transglutaminase	Confirmed	10 per 100,000	
Dermatomyositis	Skin and muscles	Anti-Jo1, Anti-Mi2, Anti-SRP, Anti-TIF1	Confirmed	9 in 1,000,000	
Discoid lupus erythematosus	Skin	ANA, Anti-dsDNA, Anti-Sm	Confirmed	Part of SLE prevalence (20-150 per 100,000)	
Epidermolysis bullosa acquisita	Skin	Anti-type VII collagen	Confirmed	Extremely rare	
Erythema nodosum	Skin	None specific	Possible	Not well established	
Gestational pemphigoid	Skin	Anti-BP180, Anti-BP230	Confirmed	Rare	
Hidradenitis suppurativa	Skin	None specific	Uncertain	1-4%	
Lichen planus	Skin, mucous membranes	None specific	Probable	1%	
Lichen sclerosus	Skin	None specific	Probable	Rare	
Linear IgA disease	Skin	Anti-epidermal basement membrane IgA	Confirmed	Extremely rare	
Morphea	Skin	None specific	Probable	Not well established	
Psoriasis	Skin	Various, not specific	Confirmed	2-3%	
Pemphigus vulgaris	Skin and mucous membranes	Anti-desmoglein 3, Anti-desmoglein 1	Confirmed	1-5 per 100,000	
Scleroderma (systemic sclerosis)	Skin, organs	ANA, anti-Scl-70, anti-centromere	Confirmed	240 per 1,000,000	
Sjögren syndrome	Exocrine glands (salivary and lacrimal glands)	Anti-SSA/Ro, Anti-SSB/La antibodies, anti-centromere	Confirmed	0.1-4% of the population	
Vitiligo	Skin	Various, not specific	Confirmed	1%	

== Digestive system ==
Autoimmune disease	Primary organ/body part affected	Autoantibodies	Acceptance as an autoimmune disease	Prevalence rate (US)	Cit.
Autoimmune enteropathy	Small intestine	Anti-enterocyte antibodies	Probable	Rare	
Autoimmune hepatitis	Liver	ANA, ASMA, anti-LKM1	Confirmed	1 in 10,000 to 1 in 50,000	
Celiac disease	Small intestine	Anti-tissue transglutaminase antibodies (tTG), Endomysial antibody (EMA), Deamidated gliadin peptide (DGP)	Confirmed	1 in 100	
Crohn's disease	Digestive tract	ASCA, Anti-OmpC, Anti-CBir1, ANCA	Probable	201 per 100,000 adults	
Intestinal necrotizing arteriolitis	Liver, pancreas and intestines.	None specific	Possible		
Pernicious anemia	Stomach	Anti-IF, Anti-parietal cell	Confirmed	0.1%	
Ulcerative colitis	Colon and rectum	pANCA, ASCA	Probable	249 per 100,000 adults	

== Heart and vascular system ==
Autoimmune disease	Primary organ/body part affected	Autoantibodies	Acceptance as an autoimmune disease	Prevalence rate (US)	Cit.
Rheumatic heart disease	Heart valves	Anti-streptolysin O (ASO), anti-DNase B	Confirmed	Declining due to improved treatment of strep throat	
Kawasaki disease	Coronary arteries	Unknown	Probable	20 per 100,000 children under age 5	
Giant cell arteritis	Large and medium arteries, can affect coronary arteries	None specific	Confirmed	200 per 100,000 (over age 50)	
Takayasu's arteritis	Large arteries, including the aorta	None specific	Confirmed	Rare, more common in East Asia	
Behçet's disease	Small to large vessels in mouth, genitals, eyes, skin	None specific	Probable		
Eosinophilic granulomatosis with polyangiitis (EGPA)	Small to medium vessels in respiratory tract, skin, heart, kidneys, nerves	ANCA	Confirmed		
Granulomatosis with polyangiitis (GPA)	Small to medium vessels in respiratory tract, kidneys	c-ANCA/PR3-ANCA	Confirmed		
IgA vasculitis (IgAV)	Small vessels in skin, joints, kidneys, gastrointestinal tract	IgA immune complexes	Probable		
Leukocytoclastic vasculitis	Small vessels in skin	Various immune complexes	Probable		
Lupus vasculitis	Small to medium vessels in multiple organs	ANA, anti-dsDNA, anti-Smith, others	Confirmed		
Rheumatoid vasculitis	Small to medium vessels in skin, nerves, eyes, heart	Rheumatoid factor, ACPA	Probable		
Microscopic polyangiitis (MPA)	Small vessels in kidneys, lungs, nerves, skin	p-ANCA/MPO-ANCA	Confirmed		
Necrotizing arteriolitis	Medium vessels in kidneys and adrenals.	None specific	Possible		
Polyarteritis nodosa (PAN)	Medium to small vessels in kidneys, skin, muscles, joints, nerves	None specific	Probable		
Polymyalgia rheumatica	Large to medium vessels in shoulders, hips	None specific	Possible		
Urticarial vasculitis	Small vessels in skin	C1q antibodies	Probable		
Vasculitis	All vessel sizes in multiple organs	Depends on specific type	Uncertain		

== Urinary system ==
Autoimmune disease	Primary organ/body part affected	Autoantibodies	Acceptance as an autoimmune disease	Prevalence rate (US)	Cit.
Goodpasture syndrome	Kidneys, lungs	Anti-GBM antibodies	Confirmed	1 per million people	
IgA nephropathy	Kidneys	IgA autoantibodies	Confirmed	3.5 per 100,000	
Membranous nephropathy	Kidneys	Anti-PLA2R antibodies	Confirmed	10 per 100,000	
Lupus nephritis	Kidneys	Anti-dsDNA, Anti-Sm, Anti-nuclear antibodies	Confirmed	Up to 60% of those with Lupus	
Interstitial nephritis	Kidneys	Various autoantibodies	Probable	Varies widely, often drug-induced	
Interstitial cystitis	Bladder	Anti-urothelial and anti-nuclear antibodies	Probable	100-450 per 100,000 women, less common in men	
Primary sclerosing cholangitis	Bile ducts, can affect gallbladder	P-ANCA, Anti Smooth Muscle Antibodies (ASMA)	Confirmed	1 per 100,000	

== Nervous system ==
Autoimmune disease	Primary organ/body part affected	Autoantibodies	Acceptance as an autoimmune disease	Prevalence rate (US)	Cit.
Acute disseminated encephalomyelitis	Central nervous system	Unknown	Confirmed	0.8 per 100,000	
Acute motor axonal neuropathy	Peripheral nerves	Anti-GM1	Confirmed	Part of Guillain-Barré syndrome prevalence	
Anti-NMDA receptor encephalitis	Brain	Anti-NMDA receptor	Confirmed	1.5 per million	
Autoimmune encephalitis	Brain	Various, depending on subtype (e.g., NMDA receptor antibodies, LGI1 antibodies)	Confirmed	Rare	
Balo concentric sclerosis	Central nervous system	Unknown	Probable	Rare	
Bickerstaff's encephalitis	Brain	Anti-GQ1b	Confirmed	Rare	
Chronic inflammatory demyelinating polyneuropathy	Peripheral nerves	Various, including anti-MAG	Confirmed	1-2 per 100,000	
Guillain-Barré syndrome	Peripheral nerves	Various, including anti-GM1, anti-GD1a	Confirmed	1-2 per 100,000	
Hashimoto's encephalopathy	Brain	Anti-thyroid (TPO, Tg)	Probable	Rare	
Idiopathic inflammatory demyelinating diseases	Central nervous system	Varies	Probable	Varies by specific disease	
Lambert–Eaton myasthenic syndrome	Neuromuscular junction (affecting both CNS and PNS)	Anti-VGCC	Confirmed	0.5-2 per million	
Multiple sclerosis	Central nervous system	Unknown, but Oligoclonal bands often present in CSF	Confirmed	90 per 100,000	
Myasthenia gravis	Neuromuscular junction (affecting both CNS and PNS)	Anti-AChR, anti-MuSK	Confirmed	20 per 100,000	
Neuromyelitis optica (Devic's disease)/NMOSD	Optic nerves and spinal cord	AQP4-IgG (NMO-IgG)	Confirmed	0.5 - 4 per 100,000	
Restless legs syndrome	Central nervous system (thought to involve dopaminergic pathways)	Unknown	Uncertain	5-15% (more common in older adults)	
Stiff-person syndrome	Central nervous system	Anti-GAD, anti-amphiphysin	Confirmed	Rare	
Sydenham's chorea	Brain	Anti-basal ganglia	Confirmed	Rare (linked to Group A streptococcal infection)	
Transverse myelitis	Spinal cord	Various, including anti-AQP4	Probable	1-8 per million	
Undifferentiated connective tissue disease (UCTD)	Various	ANA (antinuclear autoantibody) (HEp-2 cells)	Confirmed	2 per 100,000	

== Endocrine system ==
Autoimmune disease	Primary organ/body part affected	Autoantibodies	Acceptance as an autoimmune disease	Prevalence rate (US)	Cit.
Addison's disease	Adrenal glands	21-hydroxylase antibodies	Confirmed	0.93-1.4 per 10,000	
Autoimmune oophoritis	Ovaries	Anti-ovarian antibodies	Probable	Rare	
Autoimmune orchitis	Testes	Anti-sperm antibodies	Probable	Rare	
Autoimmune pancreatitis	Pancreas	IgG4, Anti-CA2 antibodies	Confirmed	0.82-1.3 per 100,000	
Autoimmune polyendocrine syndrome type 1 (APS1)	Multiple endocrine organs	Various autoantibodies depending on the organs affected	Confirmed	1 in 100,000 to 200,000	
Autoimmune polyendocrine syndrome type 2 (APS2)	Multiple endocrine organs	Various autoantibodies depending on the organs affected	Confirmed	1 in 20,000	
Autoimmune polyendocrine syndrome type 3 (APS3)	Multiple endocrine organs	Various autoantibodies depending on the organs affected	Confirmed	Rare	
Diabetes mellitus type 1	Pancreas	Anti-insulin, anti-IA-2, anti-GAD, anti-ZnT8 antibodies	Confirmed	5 per 1,000	
Endometriosis	Endometrium	Anti-endometrial antibodies	Probable	6-10% of women of reproductive age	
Graves' disease	Thyroid gland	TSI, TPO, TG antibodies	Confirmed	1.2% of the population	
Hashimoto's thyroiditis	Thyroid gland	TPO, TG antibodies	Confirmed	5% of the population	
Ord's thyroiditis	Thyroid gland	TPO, TG antibodies	Confirmed	Rare	

== Respiratory system ==
Autoimmune disease	Primary organ/body part affected	Autoantibodies	Acceptance as an autoimmune disease	Prevalence rate (US)	Cit.
Goodpasture syndrome	See urinary system (Note: For detailed information on Goodpasture syndrome, including its impact on the respiratory system, refer to its entry in the urinary system section.)	See urinary system	Confirmed	See urinary system	—N/a
Eosinophilic granulomatosis with polyangiitis (EGPA)	See vascular system (Note: For detailed information on EGPA, including its impact on the respiratory system, refer to its entry in the vascular system section.)	See vascular system	Confirmed	See vascular system	—N/a
Granulomatosis with polyangiitis (GPA)	See vascular system (Note: For detailed information on GPA, including its impact on the respiratory system, refer to its entry in the vascular system section.)	See vascular system	Confirmed	See vascular system	—N/a
Idiopathic pulmonary fibrosis	Lungs	None specific	Possible	20 per 100,000 (men), 13 per 100,000 (women)	
Interstitial lung disease	Lungs	Depends on the subtype (e.g. Anti-Jo1 in Anti-synthetase syndrome)	Probable	31.5 per 100,000 (men), 26.1 per 100,000 (women)	
Pulmonary alveolar proteinosis	Lungs	Anti-GM-CSF antibodies	Confirmed	6.2 per million	
Rheumatoid lung disease	Lungs	Rheumatoid factor, Anti-CCP antibodies	Confirmed	Part of RA prevalence (about 1%)	
Sarcoidosis	Lungs and other organs	None specific	Confirmed	10 - 40 per 100,000	

== Blood ==
Autoimmune disease	Autoantibodies	Acceptance as an autoimmune disease	Prevalence rate (US)	Cit.
Autoimmune hemolytic anemia	Anti-red blood cell antibodies	Confirmed	1-3 per 100,000	
Immune thrombocytopenia	Anti-platelet antibodies	Confirmed	3.3 per 100,000 (adults), 50 per 100,000 (children)	
Thrombotic thrombocytopenic purpura	ADAMTS13 autoantibodies	Confirmed	1-2 per million	
Antiphospholipid syndrome	Antiphospholipid antibodies	Confirmed	40-50 per 100,000	
Paroxysmal nocturnal hemoglobinuria	None specific, mutation causes self-cells to become susceptible to attack	Possible	1-2 per million	

== Reproductive system ==
The reproductive system is responsible for the production and regulation of sex hormones, the formation of germ cells, and the nurturing of fertilized eggs. In women, it includes structures such as ovaries, fallopian tubes, a uterus, and a vagina, while in men, it includes testes, vas deferens, seminal vesicles, prostate, and the penis. Autoimmune diseases of the reproductive system can affect both male and female fertility and reproductive health.

Autoimmune disease	Primary organ/body part affected	Autoantibodies	Acceptance as an autoimmune disease	Prevalence rate (US)	Cit.
Autoimmune orchitis	Testes	Anti-sperm antibodies	Probable	Not well established	
Autoimmune oophoritis	Ovaries	Anti-ovarian antibodies	Probable	Not well established	
Endometriosis	Uterus, ovaries, and pelvic tissue	Various, including anti-endometrial antibodies	Probable	Approx. 10% of women of reproductive age	
Premature ovarian failure	Ovaries	Anti-ovarian antibodies, Anti-adrenal antibodies	Confirmed	1% of women under 40 years	

== Eyes ==
Autoimmune disease	Primary organ/body part affected	Autoantibodies	Acceptance as an autoimmune disease	Prevalence rate (US)	Cit.
Autoimmune retinopathy	Retina	Various	Confirmed		
Autoimmune uveitis	Uvea	Various	Confirmed		
Cogan syndrome	Inner ear and eye	None specific	Probable		
Graves' ophthalmopathy	Eye muscles and connective tissue	TSH receptor antibodies	Confirmed		
Intermediate uveitis	Uvea (pars plana)	Various	Probable		
Ligneous conjunctivitis	Conjunctiva	Plasminogen deficiency	Possible	Rare	
Mooren's ulcer	Cornea	None specific	Probable	Rare	
Neuromyelitis optica	Optic nerve and spinal cord	Anti-AQP4	Confirmed		
Opsoclonus myoclonus syndrome	Central nervous system, eye movement control	Anti-neuronal antibodies	Possible		
Optic neuritis	Optic nerve	Various	Confirmed		
Scleritis	Sclera	Various	Possible		
Susac's syndrome	Retina, cochlea, and brain	None specific	Probable		
Sympathetic ophthalmia	Uveal tract	Various	Probable	Rare	
Tolosa–Hunt syndrome	Orbit	None specific	Uncertain	Rare	

== Musculoskeletal system ==
These autoimmune diseases are primarily associated with the muscles, joints and neuromuscular function.

Autoimmune disease	Primary organ/body part affected	Autoantibodies	Acceptance as an autoimmune disorder	Prevalence rate (US)	Cit.
Dermatomyositis	See integumentary system (Note: For detailed information on dermatomyositis, including its impact on the musclar system, refer to its entry in the integumentary system section.)	See integumentary system	Confirmed	See integumentary system	—N/a
Fibromyalgia	Musculoskeletal system, pain perception	None specific	Possible		
Inclusion body myositis	Proximal and distal muscles	None specific	Probable		
Myositis	Skeletal muscles	Various, depends on subtype	Confirmed		
Myasthenia gravis	Voluntary muscles, neuromuscular junctions	Anti-acetylcholine receptor, Anti-MuSK	Confirmed		
Neuromyotonia	Peripheral nerves affecting muscle control	Anti-voltage-gated potassium channels	Probable		
Paraneoplastic cerebellar degeneration	Central nervous system, cerebellum	Anti-Yo, Anti-Hu, Anti-Ri, others	Confirmed		
Rheumatoid arthritis	Big and small joints of extremities, temporomandibular joints	Citrullinated proteins	Confirmed	0.5 - 1%	
Polymyositis	Proximal skeletal muscles	Anti-Jo-1, Anti-SRP, others	Confirmed		

== Autoimmune comorbidities ==
This list includes conditions that are not diseases, but symptoms or syndromes common to autoimmune disease.

- Chronic fatigue syndrome
- Complex regional pain syndrome
- Eosinophilic esophagitis
- Gastritis
- POEMS syndrome
- Raynaud's phenomenon
- Primary immunodeficiency
- Pyoderma gangrenosum

== Non-autoimmune ==
At this time, there is not sufficient evidence to indicate that the diseases in the following table are caused by autoimmunity. This section is included because some of these conditions are immune-related but frequently confused with autoimmune diseases. Others are conditions that have been historically speculated as autoimmune due to overlapping symptoms like inflammation, but have been reclassified or excluded based on current research.

Disease	Reason not believed to be autoimmune	Cit.
Agammaglobulinemia	An immune system disorder but not an autoimmune disease.	
Amyloidosis	No consistent evidence of association with autoimmunity.	
Amyotrophic lateral sclerosis	No consistent evidence of association with autoimmunity.	
Anti-tubular basement membrane nephritis	No consistent evidence of association with autoimmunity.	
Atopic allergy	A hypersensitivity.	
Atopic dermatitis	A hypersensitivity.	
Autism	No consistent evidence of association with maternal autoimmunity.	
Blau syndrome	Overlaps both sarcoidosis and granuloma annulare. No evidence of association with autoimmunity.	
Cancer	No consistent evidence of association with autoimmunity.	
Castleman's disease	An immune system disorder but not an autoimmune disease.	
Chagas disease	No consistent evidence of association with autoimmunity.	
Chronic obstructive pulmonary disease	No consistent evidence of association with autoimmunity.	
Chronic recurrent multifocal osteomyelitis	LPIN2, D18S60. Synonyms: Majeed syndrome.	
Complement component 2 deficiency	Possibly symptomatic of autoimmune diseases, but not a disease.	
Congenital heart block	May be related to autoimmune activity in the mother.	
Contact dermatitis	A hypersensitivity.	
Cushing's syndrome	No consistent evidence of association with autoimmunity.	
Cutaneous leukocytoclastic angiitis	No consistent evidence of association with autoimmunity.	
Dego's disease	No consistent evidence of association with autoimmunity.	
Eosinophilic gastroenteritis	Possibly a hypersensitivity.	
Eosinophilic pneumonia	A class of diseases, some of which may be autoimmune.	
Erythroblastosis fetalis	Mother's immune system attacks fetus. An immune system disorder but not autoimmune.	
Fibrodysplasia ossificans progressiva	Possibly an immune system disorder but not autoimmune.	
Gastrointestinal pemphigoid	No consistent evidence of association with autoimmunity.	
Hypogammaglobulinemia	An immune system disorder but not autoimmune.	
Idiopathic giant-cell myocarditis	No consistent evidence of autoimmune cause though the disease has been found comorbid with other autoimmune diseases.	
Idiopathic pulmonary fibrosis	Autoantibodies: SFTPA1, SFTPA2, TERT, and TERC.	
IgA nephropathy	An immune system disorder but not an autoimmune disease.	
IPEX syndrome	A genetic mutation in FOXP3 that leads to autoimmune diseases, but not an autoimmune disorder itself.	
Ligneous conjunctivitis	No consistent evidence of association with autoimmunity.	
Majeed syndrome	No consistent evidence of association with autoimmunity.	
Narcolepsy	No evidence of association with autoimmunity. Research not reproducible.	
Rasmussen's encephalitis	No consistent evidence of association with autoimmunity.	
Schizophrenia	No consistent evidence of association with autoimmunity.	
Serum sickness	A hypersensitivity.	
Spondyloarthropathy	No consistent evidence of association with autoimmunity.	
Sweet's syndrome	No consistent evidence of association with autoimmunity.	
Takayasu's arteritis	No consistent evidence of association with autoimmunity.	
Undifferentiated spondyloarthropathy		

== See also ==
- Autoimmunity
- Autoantibody
