= Autoimmune enteropathy =

- Other names: Severe immune-mediated enteropathy, Immune-mediated protracted diarrhea of infancy
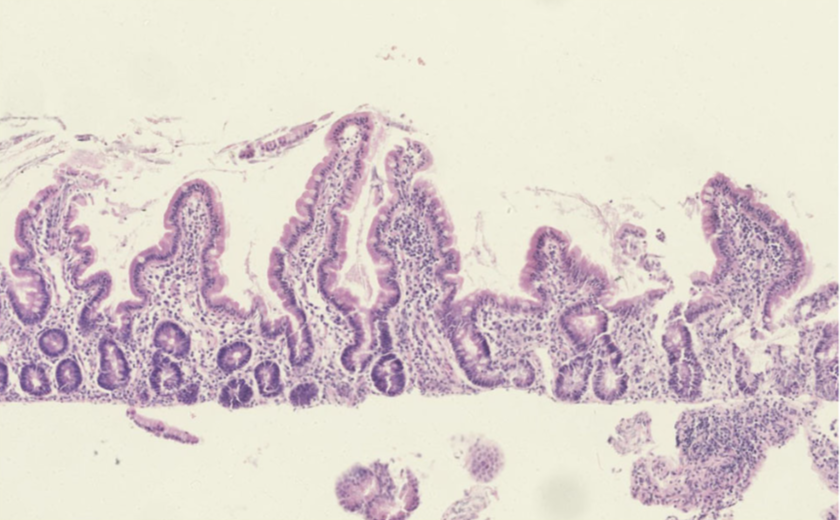
- Histological evidence of enteropathy (inflammatory infiltrate, villus blunting) seen in this intestinal biopsy from a child with malnutrition.
- Specialty: Immunology Gastroenterology
- Symptoms: Diarrhea, and autoimmune damage to the intestinal mucosa.
- Complications: Electrolyte imbalances, malabsorption, and failure to thrive.
- Usual onset: First six months of life.
- Duration: Lifelong
- Diagnostic method: histological changes, serologic testing, and clinical signs and symptoms.
- Differential diagnosis: Graft-versus-host disease, Crohn's disease, celiac disease and lactose intolerance.
- Treatment: Parenteral nutrition and corticosteroids.
- Prognosis: 30% mortality rate without treatment.
- Frequency: <1 in 100,000 infants.

Autoimmune enteropathy is a rare autoimmune disorder characterized by weight loss from malabsorption, severe and protracted diarrhea, and autoimmune damage to the intestinal mucosa. Autoimmune enteropathy typically occurs in infants and younger children however, adult cases have been reported in literature. Autoimmune enteropathy was first described by Walker-Smith et al. in 1982.

The mechanisms of autoimmune enteropathy isn't well known but dysfunction or deficiency of CD25+CD4+ regulatory T cells may play a role. Numerous other illnesses and syndromes are linked to autoimmune enteropathy, the most prominent being Autoimmune polyendocrine syndrome type 1 and immune dysregulation polyendocrinopathy enteropathy X-linked (IPEX) syndrome.

Clinical symptoms, laboratory results, and the histological characteristics of a small bowel biopsy are used to make the diagnosis. These patients typically don't respond to diet modification and often require immune-suppressants and sometimes require total parenteral nutrition. The prevalence of autoimmune enteropathy is estimated to be less than 1 in 100,000 infants

The prognosis of autoimmune enteropathy varies and depends on systemic manifestations, the severity of symptoms, and the degree of gastrointestinal involvement. Children suffering from autoimmune enteropathy are frequently vulnerable to systemic and local infections pertaining to immunotherapy, the intestinal and skin barriers, and malnourishment.

== Signs and symptoms ==
Autoimmune enteropathy usually presents within the first six months of life. Symptoms are typically seen by two to four weeks of age. The hallmark feature of autoimmune enteropathy is severe high-output diarrhea. As a result, patients may develop significant electrolyte abnormalities, malabsorption, and growth failure. More than 60% of cases have an estimated average stool output that is extremely high upon the time of diagnosis.

Multisystem manifestations may include renal, endocrine, hematologic, musculoskeletal system, pulmonary, and liver involvement. Documented conditions include nephritic and nephrotic syndrome, hypothyroidism due to interstitial fibrosis, periportal fibrosis, interstitial pneumopathy, dermatitis/atopic eczema, autoimmune hemolytic anemia, autoimmune hepatitis, chronic pancreatitis, and rheumatoid arthritis. There has also been multiple reports of thymoma presenting with autoimmune enteropathy. Those with autoimmune enteropathy may have systematic autoimmune diseases such as APECED or IPEX. Up to 83% of those with autoimmune enteropathy have one or more autoimmune disorders. These systematic manifestations may occur as a part of a syndrome or in isolation.

== Causes ==
While the degree of gastrointestinal involvement differs in syndromic forms, autoimmune enteropathy frequently occurs in conjunction with a systemic syndrome. The two primary syndromes are autoimmune polyendocrine syndrome type 1 (APS-1) and immunodysregulation polyendocrinopathy enteropathy X-linked (IPEX) syndrome. With 1 in 1.6 million cases of IPEX and 1 in 80,000–130,000 cases of APS-1, both conditions are extremely rare. Certain populations, such as Finnish and Iranian Jews, have higher rates of APS-1 prevalence.

IPEX mainly affects males and is an X-linked recessive condition caused by mutations causing loss of function in the FOXP3 gene found on the X chromosome. The Scurfin protein, which regulates the development of CD4+CD25+ regulatory T cells, is encoded by FOXP3. DNA-binding domain defects in IPEX are caused by mutations in the FOXP3 gene. This disrupts regulatory T cells' regular function, triggering aberrant immune reactions that cause autoimmune symptoms like enteropathy. As of 2018 over 70 mutations of the FOXP3 gene have been identified. The relationship between the phenotypic presentation and specific genotypes is unclear. Clinical manifestations of IPEX syndrome include eczema, endocrine disorders, and autoimmune enteropathy. The most prevalent endocrine disorder is type one diabetes however, adrenal insufficiency and thyroiditis are also common. After one month of age, the most frequent gastrointestinal symptoms are diarrhea as well as failure to thrive. Other clinical features include alopecia, nephropathy, and autoimmune hemolytic anemia.

Patients are classified as "IPEX-like" if they exhibit IPEX-like characteristics but lack the FOXP3 mutation. IPEX-like disorders can have a range of mutations in CD25, CTLA-4, STAT5B, ITCH, LRBA, and STAT1. These patients present with similar clinical manifestations to those observed in IPEX, and numerous mutations lead to abnormalities in the production or function of regulatory T cells.

CD25 deficiency is due to mutations in the IL2Rα gene and is inherited in an autosomal recessive pattern. As a result, the IL-2 receptor is expressed abnormally. Along with autoimmune enteropathy, patients often have other complications such as cytomegalovirus pneumonitis.

LRBA deficiency is caused by mutations to the LRBA gene, which serves an immunomodulatory function on CTLA4. As an immune system checkpoint, CTLA-4 prevents the growth and activation of self-reactive T cells and promotes peripheral tolerance. LRBA deficiency is inherited autosomal recessively and manifests as lymphoproliferation, enteropathy, recurrent infections, and other features of immune dysregulation. LRBA deficiency is most likely due to B cell activation. Laboratory studies often show hypogammaglobulinemia. Gastrointestinal and pulmonary involvement are common.

Both LRBA deficiency and CTLA-4 haploinsufficiency have a significant overlap in that they can cause recurrent infections and immune dysregulation. Because individuals with LRBA deficiency usually have lower levels of CTLA-4 than those with CTLA-4 haploinsufficiency, the condition frequently presents earlier in life. CTLA-4 haploinsufficiency results in abnormal regulatory T cell function and T cell proliferation, which leads to immunodeficiency and autoimmunity traits. Those with CTLA-4 haploinsufficiency with autoimmune infiltration present with frequent infections, cytopenia, and lymphoproliferation. Additionally, patients can present with symptoms associated with autoimmune enteropathy and autoimmune lymphoproliferative syndrome.

"IPEX-like disorders" can also be caused by mutations in the STAT genes, particularly STAT5B and STAT1. Because STAT5B is involved in the formation of regulatory T cells, mutations in this gene are likely to cause abnormal T lymphocyte proliferation. Those with STAT5B mutations present with pulmonary disease, immunodeficiency, and growth failure.

ITCH mutations can lead to low immune tolerance and present as developmental delay, chronic lung disease, and failure to thrive.

Autoimmune polyendocrine syndrome type 1 (APS-1) is caused by mutations in the AIRE gene located on chromosome 21 and is an autosomal recessive condition. More than 100 mutations of AIRE gene have been recorded. The classic triad of symptoms in APS-1 is hypoparathyroidism, adrenal insufficiency, and mucocutaneous candidiasis. The majority of APS-1 patients start showing symptoms early in childhood and gradually get worse as they get older. Usually, the first symptom to appear is candidiasis, which usually affects the nails or oral cavity. Adrenal insufficiency and hypoparathyroidism often follow, usually manifesting between the ages of 5 and 15. Other symptoms of APS-1 include thyroid disease, autoimmune hepatitis, type one diabetes, keratitis, alopecia, gastritis, hypogonadism, and vitiligo.

== Diagnosis ==
Autoimmune enteropathy is diagnosed by a combination of histological changes on small bowel biopsy, serologic testing, and clinical signs and symptoms. Laboratory findings such as intestinal epithelial autoantibodies aid in confirming the diagnosis.

The original diagnostic criteria of autoimmune enteropathy included intractable diarrhea that showed no improvement with diet modifications, no known immunodeficiency, and villous atrophy of the small intestine. More recent studies of adults with autoimmune enteropathy expanded the criteria to include prolonged diarrhea (lasting longer than six weeks) accompanied by malabsorption, diminished intraepithelial lymphocytosis, deep crypt lymphocytosis, increased crypt apoptotic bodies, and the exclusion of other causes of villous atrophy; each of the symptoms listed above is required for a diagnosis.

The most common site of autoimmune enteropathy is the duodenum however, autoimmune enteropathy may also affect other parts of the gastrointestinal tract. Visually, endoscopy may be normal, abnormal findings include ulcerations and mucosal hyperemia. Histopathological features include small bowel villous changes such as atrophy and blunting, typically prominent in the proximal bowel. Occasionally crypt abscesses are also seen. The crypt epithelium may contain apoptotic bodies and lymphocytic infiltration, with comparatively little surface lymphocytosis (less than 40 lymphocytes per 100 epithelial cells). Furthermore, the intestinal mucosa contains CD4-CD8 T lymphocytes and macrophages; goblet and Paneth cells may not be present. On crypt enterocytes, there is an increase in HLA class II molecular expression.

With the possible exception of prominent mesenteric lymph nodes, which may be detected in up to 40% of cases, Abdominal Imaging is typically unremarkable. An important diagnostic technique for determining the autoimmune enteropathy diagnosis is wireless capsule endoscopy. In about 47% of patients with autoimmune enteropathy, capsule endoscopy typically detects small intestinal abnormalities, mostly in the form of scalloping, mosaic pattern, mucosal fissuring, or sporadically mucosal edema and aphthous ulceration, which are primarily limited to the proximal small bowel.

Other laboratory abnormalities such as elevated hepatic transaminases, 67% of patients, mild immune-globulin deficiencies of IgG, IgM, or IgA in 33%, and vitamin deficiencies in 90%.

Antibodies such as anti-smooth muscle antibodies, anti-liver/kidney microsomal antibodies, and the antinuclear antibody are sometimes positive however, this may be due to comorbid autoimmune disorders as appose to autoimmune enteropathy. The presence of anti-goblet or anti-enterocyte cell antibodies raises the likelihood of autoimmune enteropathy, but are sometimes not present and are therefore not requires to establish diagnosis.

=== Differential diagnosis ===
Autoimmune enteropathy and CVID share a number of characteristics, which can complicate diagnosis. Features found in both disorders include crypt destruction and villous atrophy. When doing a biopsy, plasma cell loss can aid in differentiating between the two conditions because, although plasma cells may not be present in CVID, autoimmune enteropathy is frequently characterized by a high number of plasma cells.

Based on histologic findings the differential diagnosis of pediatric autoimmune enteropathy is graft-versus-host disease, Crohn's disease, and food sensitivity enteropathies such as celiac disease and lactose intolerance.

Lactose intolerance should be excluded in infants with intractable diarrhea. Like autoimmune enteropathy, lactose intolerance can affect the whole GI tract with primary findings in the small bowel. Biopsy reveals prominent mononuclear cell infiltrate of the lamina propria, reveal flattened villi, and edema. Unlike autoimmune enteropathy, lactose intolerance is often characterized by absent crypt apoptosis and increased eosinophils.

There are similarities between Crohn's disease and autoimmune enteropathy concerning their clinical and pathological presentations. However, rather than a lymphoplasmacytic infiltrate, the mucosal injury associated with Crohn's disease is more frequently accompanied by acute inflammation. Granulomas additionally support the diagnosis of Crohn's disease.

There is no difference between autoimmune enteropathy and graft-versus-host disease when it comes to apoptosis. Correlation with the patient's clinical history is crucial in this situation.

== Treatment ==
Many patients with autoimmune enteropathy develop malnutrition. Oral nutritional supplements may help manage malnutrition however parenteral nutrition is often required. Corticosteroids such as prednisone and budesonide are often the first line of treatment. In those who do not respond to corticosteroids immunosuppressive drugs such as infliximab, tacrolimus, 6-mercaptopurine, sirolimus, azathioprine, mycophenolate mofetil, rituximab, and cyclosporine have been used. These medications have also been used alongside corticosteroids as maintenance therapy. These medications often have adverse side effects and don't always help maintain remission.

Mesenchymal stem cell therapy has also been used to treat autoimmune enteropathy and has been shown to be curative.

== Outlook ==
Without treatment mortality rates of autoimmune enteropathy are as high as 30%. Many factors such as the need for parenteral nutrition, age of presentation, and the severity of symptoms can impact long-term outcomes. No one treatment has been proven successful in all cases and relapses are common.

== Epidemiology ==
Autoimmune enteropathy is estimated to occur in less than 1 in 100,000 infants.

There has been an increasing amount of adult-onset autoimmune enteropathy. The median age of diagnosis is 55 years old in adults with autoimmune enteropathy. 87% of these patients were white and there seems to be an equal distribution of females and males.

== See also ==
- Autoimmune polyendocrine syndrome type 1
- IPEX syndrome
