= Autoimmune polyendocrine syndrome type 3 =

- Other names: Autoimmune polyendocrinopathy type 3, Autoimmune polyglandular syndrome type 3, APS type 3, APS3, PAS3.
- Specialty: Endocrinology, Rheumatology
- Symptoms: Any symptoms associated with its constituent diseases
- Complications: Autoimmune thyroiditis (Always), Celiac Disease, Type I Diabetes, Autoimmune hypophysitis, Systemic Lupus Erythematosus, Sjögren's Syndrome, Vitiligo (May or May not be Present)
- Usual onset: Any Age
- Duration: Lifelong
- Types: APS 3A: Autoimmune thyroiditis with Immune Mediated diabetes mellitus; APS 3B: Autoimmune thyroiditis with Pernicious anemia; APS 3C: Autoimmune thyroiditis with Vitiligo and/or Alopecia and/or Another Organ Specific Disease
- Causes: Combination of Genetic and Environmental Factors
- Risk factors: Family History of APS III or other Autoimmune Diseases
- Diagnostic method: Serum antibody assays; Autoimmune Thyroiditis Required for Diagnosis
- Differential diagnosis: Autoimmune Polyendocrine Syndrome Type II, APECED, IPEX
- Prevention: N/A
- Treatment: Depends on Constituent Diseases
- Prognosis: Normal Lifespan
- Frequency: ~ 2-3% of population

Autoimmune polyendocrine syndrome, type 3 is a condition characterized by the coexistence of autoimmune thyroiditis and at least one other autoimmune disease (excluding Addison's Disease). Based on other organ-specific autoimmune involvement, there are multiple subtypes that are classified: type 3a shows thyroid autoimmune disease in conjunction with type 1 diabetes, type 3b shows thyroid autoimmune disease in conjunction with pernicious anemia (PA), and type 3c shows thyroid autoimmune disease in conjunction with alopecia, vitiligo, or other organ-specific autoimmune disease.

== Related Conditions ==
The hallmark of autoimmune polyglandular syndromes (APS) is the existence of autoimmune reactions directed against multiple endocrine and non-endocrine organs. There have been described as four primary types:

- APS-1 [Autoimmune-Polyendocrine-Candidiasis-Ectodermal-Dystrophy Syndrome (APECED)]: Chronic hypoparathyroidism, autoimmune Addison's disease, and chronic candidiasis (two conditions must exist for the term to be used).
- APS-2 (Schmidt's disease): Autoimmune Addison's disease (constantly present), in conjunction with either type 1 diabetes mellitus (DM) or autoimmune thyroid disease.
- APS-3: Type 1 diabetes, atrophic gastritis, pernicious anemia, vitiligo, alopecia, and myasthenia gravis, and autoimmune thyroid disease; Addison's disease and/or hypoparathyroidism are not included in this association.
- APS-4: Combinations that weren't in the earlier groups.

== Signs and symptoms ==
Most patients with autoimmune polyendocrine syndrome type 3 have autoimmune thyroid diseases associated with only one other autoimmune disease; these associations are most frequently with either type 1 diabetes (20–30% of cases) or chronic atrophic gastritis (39 percent of cases). Other disorders associated with autoimmune polyendocrine syndrome type 3 are pernicious anemia, vitiligo, alopecia, and myasthenia gravis.

== Epidemiology ==
Autoimmune polyendocrine syndrome, type 3 has a frequency of 1.4 to 2 per 100,000 people, with no discernible ethnic group preference.
