= Myeloid-derived suppressor cell =

Group of immune cells in the bone marrow

A cell that arises from a progenitor cell during hematopoiesis. Myeloid cells can become granulocytes, monocytes, erythrocytes, or platelets.

Myeloid-derived suppressor cells (MDSC) are a heterogeneous group of immune cells from the myeloid lineage (a family of cells that originate from bone marrow stem cells).

MDSCs expand under pathologic conditions such as chronic infection and cancer, as a result of altered haematopoiesis. MDSCs differ from other myeloid cell types in that they have immunosuppressive activities, as opposed to immune-stimulatory properties. Similar to other myeloid cells, MDSCs interact with immune cell types such as T cells, dendritic cells, macrophages and natural killer cells to regulate their functions. Tumors with high levels of infiltration by MDSCs have been associated with poor patient outcome and resistance to therapies. MDSCs can also be detected in the blood. In patients with breast cancer, levels of MDSC in blood are about 10-fold higher than normal. The size of the myeloid suppressor compartment is considered to be an important factor in the success or failure of cancer immunotherapy, highlighting the importance of this cell type for human pathophysiology. A high level of MDSC infiltrate in the tumor microenvironment correlates with shorter survival times of patients with solid tumors and could mediate resistance to checkpoint inhibitor therapy. Studies are needed to determine whether MDSCs are a population of immature myeloid cells that have stopped differentiation or a distinct myeloid lineage.

== Formation ==
MDSCs are formed from bone marrow precursors when myelopoietic processes are interrupted, caused by several illnesses. Cancer patients' growing tumors produce cytokines and other substances that affect MDSC development. Tumor cell lines overexpress colony-stimulating factors (G-CSF and GM-CSF) and IL6, which promote development of MDSCs that have immune suppressive function in vivo. Other cytokines, including IL10, IL1, VEGF, and PGE2 have been associated with the formation and regulation of MDSCs. GM-CSF promotes synthesis of MDSCs from bone marrow, and the transcription factor c/EBP regulates development of MDSCs in bone marrow and in tumors. STAT3 also promotes development of MDSCs, whereas IRF8 could counteract MDSC-inducing signals.

MDSCs migrate as immature cells from the bone marrow to peripheral tissues (or tumors), where they differentiate into mature macrophages, dendritic cells, and neutrophils without suppressive phenotypes under homeostatic conditions, but become polarized when exposed to pro-inflammatory compounds, chemokines, and cytokines. In the tumor microenvironment, they suppress the anti-tumor immune response. The presence of MDSCs has been associated with progression of colon cancer, tumor angiogenesis, and metastases. In addition to producing NO and ROS, MDSCs secrete immune-regulatory cytokines such as TNF, TGFB, and IL10. There are subpopulations of MDSC that have some common suppressive characteristics but also have their own unique features; different subpopulations can be found in different areas of the same tissue or tumor. Tumor-infiltrating MDSCs develop in response to environmental factors, upregulating CD38 (which removes NAD from the environment and is necessary for mitochondrial biosynthesis), PDL-1 (an immune checkpoint protein) and LOX1 (promotes fatty acid consumption and fatty acid oxidation). Tumor-infiltrating MDSCs also secrete exosomes that can inhibit the anti-tumor immune response.

=== Immature Myeloid Cells in Formation of MDSCs ===
Myeloid-derived suppressor cells (MDSCs) are a recently discovered bone-marrow-derived cell type. They have characteristic of immature stem cells with immunomodulatory properties. In fact, they are used in research to develop therapeutic strategies against both autoimmune diseases and exacerbate inflammation, which has special interest in the central nervous system. The main inconvenient of MDSCs is that they are only formed during inflammatory conditions, thus being commonly gathered from diseased subjects.

However, a recent research of the University of Salamanca has demonstrated that immature myeloid cells (IMCs), the precursors of MDSCs, have also potential immunosuppressive activity under pathological conditions. IMCs can be directly gathered from healthy bone marrow, which is a more clinically feasible source. Then, IMCs under pathological conditions behave as MDSCs exerting immunomodulation. In this sense, IMCs can be directly used thus avoiding their gathering from diseased subjects.

In addition, IMCs are promising adjuvants when performing neurosurgery. They application in an intracranial surgery almost completely prevented the impairments caused by this procedure in mice, probably by the modulation of the inflammatory patterns. In this sense, IMCs have a direct pre-clinical application to minimize the secondary effects inherent to every single intracranial surgery, especially in a diseased environment.

== MDSC differentiation ==
=== In humans ===
MDSCs derive from bone marrow precursors usually as the result of a perturbed myeloipoiesis caused by different pathologies. In cancer patients, growing tumors secrete a variety of cytokines and other molecules which are key signals involved in the generation of MDSC. Myeloid-derived suppressor cells (MDSCs) migrate to tumour sites and peripheral lymphoid organs. Tumor cell lines overexpressing colony stimulating factors (e.g. G-CSF and GM-CSF) have long been used in vivo models of MDSC generation. GM-CSF, G-CSF and IL-6 allow the in vitro generation of MDSC that retain their suppressive function in vivo. In addition to CSF, other cytokines such as IL-6, IL-10, VEGF, PGE2 and IL-1 have been implicated in the development and regulation of MDSC. The myeloid-differentiation cytokine GM-CSF is a key factor in MDSC production from bone marrow, and it has been shown that the c/EBPβ transcription factor plays a key role in the generation of in vitro bone marrow-derived and in vivo tumor-induced MDSC. Moreover, STAT3 promotes MDSC differentiation and expansion and IRF8 has been suggested to counterbalance MDSC-inducing signals.

=== In mice ===
Murine MDSCs show two distinct phenotypes which discriminate them into either monocytic MDSCs or granulocytic MDSCs. The relationship between these two subtypes remains controversial, as they closely resemble monocytes and neutrophils respectively. While monocyte and neutrophil differentiation pathways within the bone marrow are antagonistic and dependent on the relative expression of IRF8 and c/EBP transcription factors (and hence there is not a direct precursor-progeny link between these two myeloid cell types), this seems not to be the case for MDSCs. Monocytic MDSCs seem to be precursors of granulocytic subsets demonstrated both in vitro and in vivo. This differentiation process is accelerated upon tumor infiltration and possibly driven by the hypoxic tumor microenvironment.

== Phenotype ==
=== Natural killer cells ===
The depletion of MDSCs from mice with liver cancer significantly increases natural killer (NK) cell cytotoxicity, NKG2D expression, and IFNg (IFNg) production and induces NK cell energy. MDSC depletion restored the function of impaired hepatic NK cells. An MDSC derived from chronic inflammation caused T and NK-cell dysfunction along with downregulation of the TCR z chain (CD247). The immunosuppressive milieu directly affects CD247, which is crucial in initiating immune responses. MDSCs, acting through membrane-bound TGF-b1, inhibit NK cells in tumor-bearing hosts due to the activity of TGF-b1 on MDSCs. Therefore, MDSCs constitutively suppress hepatic NK cells in tumor-bearing hosts through TGF-b1 on MDSCs.

=== B and T cells ===
A number of studies have reported MDSC regulation of B-cell responses to activators and mitogens that are not MHC-regulated, as well as antigen-specific T cell responses. An infection with the LP-BM5 murine leukemia virus (a retrovirus) can cause acquired immune deficiency in mice, which causes highly immunosuppressive CD11bCGr-1CLy6CC MDSCs. These cells suppress T and B cells by signaling via nitric oxide (NO).

=== Dendritic cells ===
Immune responses against tumors and infections are regulated by myeloid-derived suppressor cells and dendritic cells (DCs). The combination of LPS and IFNg treatment of bone marrow-derived MDSCs limits DC formation and improves MDSC suppressive action. MDSCs have been shown to reduce the effectiveness of DC vaccinations. MDSC frequency has no effect on DC production or survivability, but it does cause a dose-dependent reduction in DC maturation. High CD14CHLA-DR/low cell frequencies can stifle DC maturation and decrease DC function, both of which are critical for vaccination effectiveness. As a result, the balance between MDSCs and DCs might be crucial in tumor and infection treatment. Thus, the balance between MDSCs and DCs may play an important role in tumor and infection therapy.

== Activity/function ==
MDSCs are immune suppressive and play a role in tumor maintenance and progression. MDSCs also obstruct therapies that seek to treat cancer through both immunotherapy and other non-immune means. MDSC activity was originally described as suppressors of T cells, in particular of CD8+ T-cell responses. The spectrum of action of MDSC activity also encompasses NK cells, dendritic cells and macrophages. Suppressor activity of MDSC is determined by their ability to inhibit the effector function of lymphocytes. Inhibition can be caused by different mechanisms. It is primarily attributed to the effects of the metabolism of L-arginine. Another important factor influencing the activity of MDSC is oppressive ROS.

=== Effect of MMR vaccination ===
MDSCs can also play a positive regulatory role. It is stated that MMR vaccine stimulates MDSC populations in people taking the vaccine, inhibiting septic inflammation and mortality that is broadly applicable not only to measles, mumps, and rubella, but extends to COVID-19-induced cytokine inflammation. This vaccine stimulation of MDSCs appears to be temporary, neither permanent nor chronic. Despite MDSCs being immunosuppressive in certain instances, the MMR vaccine is overall immunostimulatory.

== MDSC inhibitors ==
In addition to host-derived factors, pharmacologic agents also have profound impact on MDSC. Chemotherapeutic agents belonging to different classes have been reported to inhibit MDSC. Although this effect may well be secondary to inhibition of hematopoietic progenitors, there may be grounds for search of selectivity based on long-known differential effects of these agents on immunocompetent cells and macrophages. In 2015, MDSCs were compared to immunogenic myeloid cells highlighting a group of core signaling pathways that control pro-carcinogenic MDSC functions. Many of these pathways are known targets of chemotherapy drugs with strong anti-cancer properties.

Histamine H2 receptor antagonists such as ranitidine have been shown to reduce monocytic MDSC populations in the spleen and bone marrow in mouse breast tumor models, delaying tumor development and reducing metastasis.

As of May 2018 there are no FDA approved drugs developed to target MDSCs but the experimental INB03 has entered early clinical trials. It is designed to specifically neutralize soluble TNF.

There is promising evidence for inhibiting Galectin-3 as a therapeutic target to reduce MDSCs. In a Phase 1b clinical trial of GR-MD-02 developed by Galectin Therapeutics, investigators observed a significant decrease in the frequency of suppressive myeloid-derived suppressor cells following treatment in responding melanoma patients.

== History ==
The term myeloid-derived suppressor cell originated in a 2007 journal article published in Cancer Research by Gabrilovich et al. Publications in 2008 established that there are two subpopulations of MDSC: mononuclear MDSC (M-MDSC) and polymorphonuclear or granulocytic MDSC (PMN-MDSC). M-MDSC are similar to monocytes found in blood, while PMN-MDSC are physically akin to neutrophils.
