= Chronic diarrhea of infancy =

- Other names: Toddler's diarrhea
- Specialty: Pediatrics

Chronic diarrhea (alternate spelling: diarrhoea) of infancy, also called toddler's diarrhea, is a common condition typically affecting up to 1.7 billion children between ages 6–30 months worldwide every year, usually resolving by age 4. According to the World Health Organization (WHO), diarrheal disease is the second greatest cause of death in children 5 years and younger. Diarrheal disease takes the lives of 525,000 or more children per year. Diarrhea is characterized as the condition of passing of three or more loose or watery bowel movements within a day sometimes with undigested food visible. Diarrhea is separated into three clinical categories; acute diarrhea may last multiple hours or days, acute bloody diarrhea, also known as dysentery, and finally, chronic or persistent diarrhea which lasts 2–4 weeks or more. There is normal growth with no evidence of malnutrition in the child experiencing persistent diarrhea. In chronic diarrhea there is no evidence of blood in the stool and there is no sign of infection. The condition may be related to irritable bowel syndrome. There are various tests that can be performed to rule out other causes of diarrhea that don't fall under the chronic criteria, including blood test, colonoscopy, and even genetic testing. Most acute or severe cases of diarrhea have treatment guidelines revolving around prescription or non prescription (also known as over the counter or OTC) medications based on the cause, but the treatment protocols for chronic diarrhea focus on replenishing the body with lost fluids and electrolytes, because there typically isn't a treatable cause.

== Signs and symptoms ==
Toddler's diarrhea is characterized by three or more watery stools per day that persist for 2–4 weeks or more. Newborns and infants may normally have soft and frequent stools; however, any noticeable changes in stool frequency or form (i.e. watery) can indicate toddler's diarrhea. Other symptoms may include chills, fever, abdominal pain or cramping, nausea, and/or vomiting. Undigested food and/or mucus may also be observed in stools. More serious symptoms may include bloody stools, weight loss, greasy stools, and/or severe abdominal pain.

Aside from these signs and symptoms, infants and children present as healthy individuals with appropriate weight gain (considering sufficient calorie intake), active lifestyles, and normal appetites.

=== Complications ===
Possible complications associated with toddler's diarrhea include malabsorption and dehydration.

Malabsorption affects the small intestine and results in the impaired absorption of important nutrients from an infant or child's diet, leading to malnutrition. Malabsorption is indicated by symptoms of bloating, appetite changes, weight loss, and/or gas.

Dehydration occurs when there is not enough fluid intake to compensate for increased loss of fluid and electrolytes that may result from chronic diarrhea. Dehydration is indicated by symptoms of thirst, absence of tears when crying, infrequent urination, dry mouth, and/or decreased energy.

== Cause ==
Diarrhea happens when the amount of fluids absorbed in the intestine does not match the amount secreted. The imbalance can be achieved in two ways: an excess of secretion or a lack of absorption. Thus, diarrhea can be categorized into secretory diarrhea, an excess of secretion, or osmotic diarrhea which is a lack of absorption. Usually both categories are present in chronic diarrhea of infants.

Secretory diarrhea can be caused by either infectious or non-infectious agents. Infectious agents include bacteria, viruses, and protozoans while non-infectious agents can be hormones, neurotransmitters, cytokines, and others. Osmotic diarrhea occurs when nutrients that are not absorbed exists in the intestines, typically due to damage to the intestines. The nutrients that are unable to be absorbed in the intestines draws water to itself.

Some factors that lead to chronic diarrhea of infancy:

- Underdeveloped digestive system, nutrients do not spend adequate time in the digestive tract for water to be absorbed which leads to diarrhea.
- Imbalanced Diet — a diet that has excess fiber and/or a lack of fat, fat can slow down the digestion process and prolong the amount of time nutrients spend in the tract which increases absorption. Fiber can lead to diarrhea because it shortens the amount of time food spends in the intestines, decreasing absorption.
- Inability to absorb carbohydrates

The specific source of chronic diarrhea typically depends on the age of the infant/child. Diarrhea is uncommon for newborns; consequently, its presence in newborns could indicate a congenital disorder which would need hospitalization. Rare causes of chronic diarrhea in young children include a group of genetic mutations known as "congenital diarrhea and enteropathies" (CODEs). This group of genetic disorders usually presents in the first weeks of birth as severe and debilitating diarrhea and can lead to malabsorption, growth failure, and difficulty feeding. CODEs are rare genetic changes to a single gene that affects the lining of the intestine or changes to the immune system that also affects the cell function of important nutrient and electrolyte transporters in the intestine such as Cl^{−}/HCO_{3}^{−} mutation.

Otherwise, socioeconomic factors and access to treatment/healthcare play a significant part in developing chronic diarrhea as an infant. For instance, leading causes of chronic diarrhea in developing countries are infections of the intestine. In developed countries, chronic diarrhea has a diverse range of causes such as chronic infection of the intestines, autoimmune enteropathy, and inability to absorb nutrients via celiac disease, food sensitivities, etc.

From age 0–30 days, typical causes are:

- Abetalipoproteinemia, a condition caused by a genetic mutation that creates abnormal absorption of fats and some vitamins.
- Acrodermatitis enteropathica, a condition in which the intestine cannot absorb zinc.
- Autoimmune enteropathy, a rare condition in which the intestines are perceived as a foreign threat by the immune system and are attacked leading to irritation and inflammation.
- Microvillous inclusion disease, a condition caused by a genetic mutation leading to severe diarrhea because intestinal cells did not have normal development and thus the intestines are not able to absorb nutrients properly.
- Congenital chloride diarrhea, a lifelong condition caused by a genetic mutation that leads to diarrhea with a high concentration of chloride.
- Congenital sodium diarrhea, a genetic disorder caused by mutations in electrolyte transporters that disrupt the transport of Na^{+} across the intestine and results in high levels of Na^{+} greater than 145 mM in the stool.
- Congenital short-bowel syndrome, a condition in which a portion of the small intestine is absent or not functioning properly leading to decreased absorption of both fluids and nutrients.
- Congenital lactase deficiency, a condition caused by a genetic mutation in which the body cannot digest lactose properly.
- Glucose-galactose malabsorption, a genetic disorder caused by changes in a protein critical for the transport of glucose and galactose across the intestine which leads to impaired glucose/galactose absorption, dehydration, and severe diarrhea in young children. Typically, the severe diarrhea improves with a diet low in glucose/galactose and the tolerability to glucose/galactose improves with age.
- Hirschsprung's disease (HSCR), a gut motility disorder characterized by a lack of nerve cells in the large intestine which are needed to move the stool through the digestive tract. In infants, HSCR typically presents when a newborn is unable to pass the first feces, or meconium within 48 hours of birth. Other symptoms include blockage of the intestine, fever, rapid release of stool and flatulence upon rectal examination, and may present with diarrhea in infants.
- Intestinal pseudo-obstruction (IPO), a gut motility disorder characterized by the inability to contract intestinal walls with symptoms similar to intestinal obstruction but lack a distinguishable cause of obstruction. Signs and symptoms include abdominal pain, dilated or enlarged bowel, constipation and may include diarrhea. Although rare in infants, IPO is a type of congenital disorder that may present with diarrhea in infants.
- Primary bile acid malabsorption, a gut defect in the reabsorption of bile acids in the small intestine which results in increased levels of bile acids in the colon leading to watery diarrhea and bloating.
- Chronic infection of C. difficile, G. lamblia
  - C. difficile — bacteria that can be the source of diarrhea.
  - G. lamblia — a parasite that can be the source diarrhea.

From 1–12 months, typical causes of chronic diarrhea are the following:

- Acrodermatitis enteropathica, a condition in which the intestine cannot absorb zinc.
- Cystic fibrosis, a condition caused by a genetic mutation that can lead to injury to the body's organs including the lungs and those in the digestive system.
- Apple juice and pear nectar, the digestive tract of children have difficulty absorbing significant quantities of sugars and carbohydrates which certain fruit juices can have.
- Celiac Disease, a disorder in which there is an immune response to eating gluten which can eventually cause damage to the small intestine over time and impedes absorption.
- Food allergy.

Most instances of chronic diarrhea in infancy are caused by infectious and post infectious disease of the intestine as well as food sensitivities or allergies.

== Diagnosis ==
Diagnosis of toddler's diarrhea involves the evaluation of history of present illness, any relevant past medical history, and physical examination to determine any causative factors to inform treatment regimens and further recommendations.

Evaluation of history of present illness includes:

- Stool characterization (i.e. appearance, consistency, frequency, etc.)
- Time frame and duration (important for differentiation between acute and chronic diarrhea)
- Food/drink allergies or restrictions (e.g. lactose intolerance)
- Medications, especially antibiotics
- Infection exposure (e.g. travel)

Evaluation of past medical history includes:

- Family history
- Conditions such as inflammatory bowel disease, cystic fibrosis, and celiac disease

Physical examination involves:

- Abdominal examination (tenderness, distention, and/or bowel sounds)
- Genital examination (rashes, anal fissures, and/or ulcerative lesions)
- General assessment and vital signs (any signs of dehydration such as tachycardia and low blood pressure)
- Examination of extremities and head (any signs of dehydration such as dry mucous membranes and skin turgor)

=== Diagnostic Tests ===
The following tests can also be performed to assist in the diagnosis of toddler's diarrhea and evaluation of any associated complications/underlying conditions:

- Stool tests provide further information about bleeding, infectious agents, and/or anatomical problems.
- Blood tests allow assessment of inflammatory markers and/or other criterion for causative diseases.
- X-rays provide evaluations of any problems that may originate in the gastrointestinal tract/liver/etc.
- Upper endoscopy or colonoscopy allows visualization of the gastrointestinal tract to assess location of inflammation.
- Breath hydrogen tests are utilized to determine lactose, fructose, and/or sucrose intolerance. Small intestinal bacterial overgrowth (SIBO) may also be indicated by this test.

==== Genetic Testing ====
Most commonly, chronic diarrhea in infants and children are classified as acquired diarrhea, identified with the general diagnostic tests mentioned above. The other classification of chronic diarrhea, congenital diarrheas and enteropathies (CODEs), are rare diagnoses of exclusion. With recent advances in genome sequencing, the addition of targeted genetic testing to diagnostic algorithms has been proposed to allow faster diagnoses and earlier treatment of CODEs. While certain genes and mutations have been associated with various CODEs, further research and studies are necessary to support the role of diagnostic genetic testing.

== Treatment ==
According to doctors of the National Institute of Diabetes and Digestive and Kidney Diseases (NIDDK), treating the cause of chronic diarrhea in infants is primarily through diet (e.g. avoiding foods their bodies don't tolerate such as gluten, lactose, fructose, and sucrose). Dietary fiber and fat can be increased and fluid intake, especially fruit juice intake, decreased. With these considerations, NIDDK doctors recommend that children consume a normal balanced diet based on their age to avoid malnutrition or growth restriction.

Non-prescription medications such as loperamide are not recommended by the Centers for Disease Control and Prevention for children below 6 years of age as they don't address the underlying cause of the condition. According to Benjamin Ortiz, M.D., a pediatrician in the Food and Drug Administration's Office of Pediatric Therapeutics, bismuth subsalicylate is not recommended in children below 12 years of age because its contents, including magnesium, aluminum, and bismuth, are not readily cleared from their bodies, making them more susceptible to harm.

Studies have shown that certain probiotic preparations such as Lactobacillus rhamnosus (a bacterium) and Saccharomyces boulardii (a yeast) may be effective at reducing the duration and severity of diarrhea in acute settings as a result of gastroenteritis, while other studies have found that the use of probiotics doesn't have an effect on the length of diarrhea in toddlers.

While treatments for chronic diarrhea of infancy aren't clear cut, it is crucial to address the complications of dehydration that may arise from chronic diarrhea with the American Academy of Pediatrics (AAP) guidelines recommendation of oral rehydration therapy (ORT). Oral rehydration solution (ORS), recommended by both AAP and the World Health Organization (WHO), must be composed of 50-90mEq/L sodium and 2% glucose or other complex carbohydrates. ORS is easily found in the US because it is available without a prescription. The typical amount of ORS administered is 50mL/kg over a 4-hour time period for mild dehydration and 100mL/kg over a 4-hour time period for moderate dehydration with an extra 10mL/kg for every loose stool. Repeat this administration regimen for as long as the signs and symptoms of dehydration continue. It is important to take measures early on to maintain hydration. Along with ORT, WHO recommends a 10-14 day course of 20 mg zinc tablet supplementation, stating it will shorten the length of diarrhea and potentially improving harmful outcomes.

The NIDDK recommends a visit to the doctor when a child experiences stools containing pus or blood (black, tarry, or coffee ground-like appearance), signs of dehydration, diarrhea longer than 24 hours, or a fever of 102 degrees or more.

== Epidemiology ==
Diarrheal illness in children accounts for 1.5 to 2.5 million deaths per year worldwide. It is responsible for the secondary cause of mortality among children less than 5 years of age surpassing the combined childhood deaths from malaria, measles, and AIDS. In 2009, the World Health Organization (WHO)/United Nations International Children's Emergency Fund (UNICEF) reported 2.5 billion cases of diarrhea in children less than 5 years old. More than half of the cases occurred in Africa and South Asia. It is estimated that Africa and South Asia comprise more than 80% of deaths from diarrhea in children. In fact, about 75% of the childhood deaths from diarrhea come from only 15 countries. According to the World Health Organization (WHO), the proportion of deaths attributable to diarrheal illness among children less than 5 years of age was 13.2% in 2002. Half of these childhood deaths were due to chronic diarrheal causes.

Worldwide, studies estimate that diarrheal illness affects 3 to 20% of children under the age of 5 with an incidence of 2.7 episodes of diarrhea per child-year. Developing nations experience higher burden of disease and mortality from chronic diarrhea in children compared to developed nations. In the United States, it is reported that 15 to 20% of young children have an episode of acute diarrhea each year. Compared to worldwide estimates, the United States has a lower incidence rate of chronic diarrhea in young children reported at 0.18 episodes per child year. In pediatrics, diarrhea is a common complaint making up 9% of U.S. hospital visits for children less than 5 years old. In contrast to resource-poor nations, resource-rich nations such as the United States experience less chronic diarrhea severity. In the United States, approximately a quarter of chronic diarrhea cases in young children seek medical care and less than 1% of cases are hospitalized.
