= Wiesław Gliński =

Polish physician

- Born: 18 February 1947 (age 79); Wrocław
- Died: 5 July 2013 (aged 66)
- Education: Medical University of Warsaw
- Occupations: physician, habilitated doctor of medical sciences

Wiesław Antoni Gliński (18 February 1947 in Wrocław – 5 July 2013) was a Polish physician, habilitated doctor of medical sciences, specializing in dermatology, venereology, and immunology. He was a pioneer in autoimmune skin diseases research, primarily focusing on psoriasis.

== Biography ==
He was a disciple of Professor Stefania Jabłońska. Since 1971, he was an employee, and since 2007 also the head of the Department and Clinic of Dermatology at the Medical University of Warsaw. Additionally, from 1990 to 1993 and from 1993 to 1996, he served as the vice-dean, and from 1996 to 1999 and from 1999 to 2002, as the dean of the Faculty of Medicine I at the same university. From 2002 to 2005, he was the vice-rector for science and international cooperation, and from 2005 to 2008, the vice-rector for clinical affairs, investments, and cooperation with the region. He held the position of president of the Polish Dermatological Society and was the National Consultant in Dermatology.

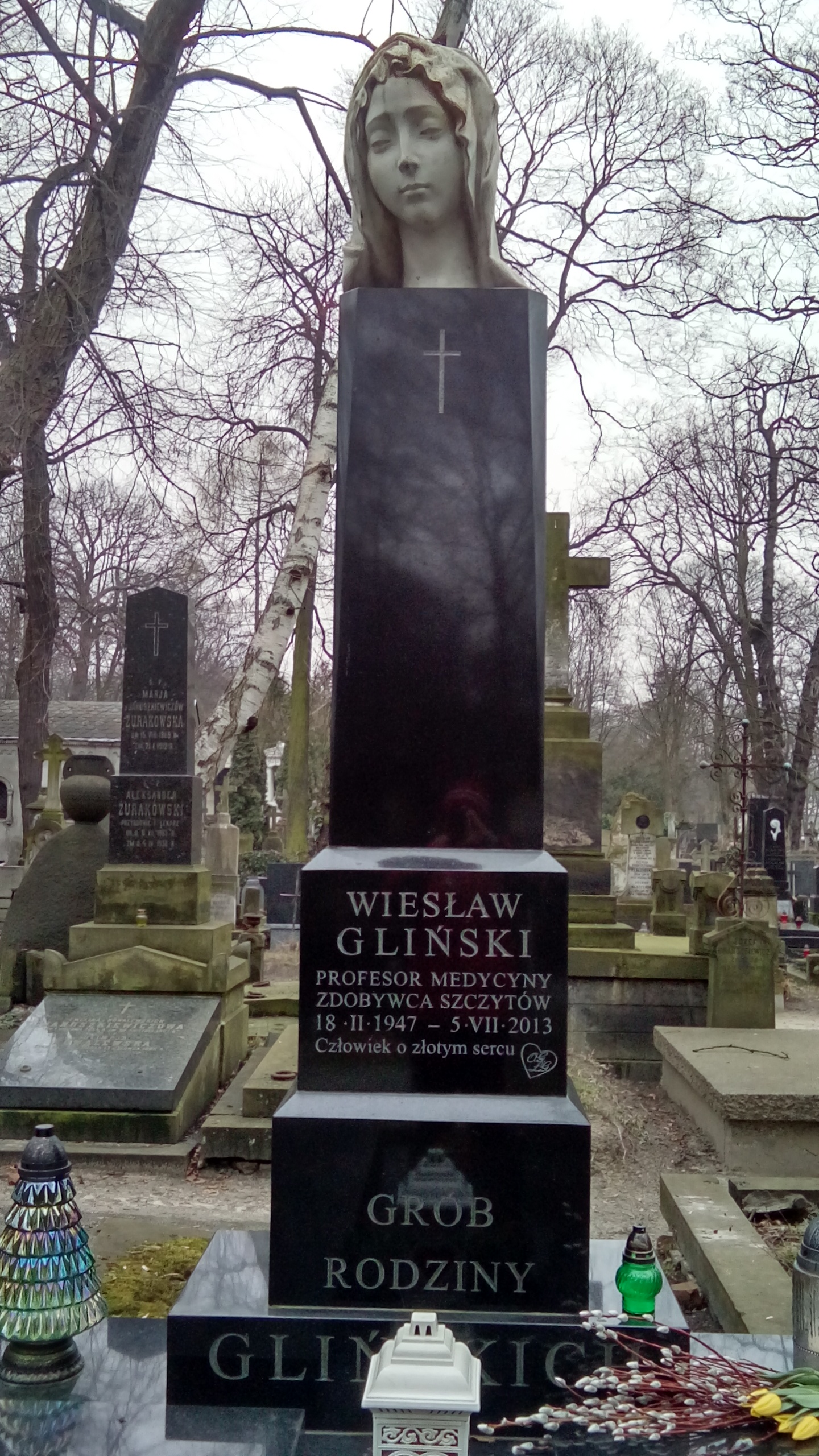
Grave of Wieslaw Glinski in Powazki cemetery

On 10 July 2013 he was buried at the Powązki Cemetery in Warsaw.

== Awards and decorations ==
- Knight's Cross of the Order of Polonia Restituta (2005)
- Gold Cross of Merit (2000)
- Honorary Badge "For Merit in Healthcare Protection"
- Medal of the Commission of National Education
- Gold Medal for Long Service
- Medal for Merit to the Faculty of Medicine I, Medical University of Warsaw.
