= LPS-responsive beige-like anchor protein deficiency =

- This condition is inherited in an autosomal recessive manner.

LPS-responsive beige-like anchor protein deficiency is a rare genetic condition caused by the absence of LPS-responsive beige-like anchor protein (LRBA).

== Signs and symptoms ==
The presentation of this condition is variable making the diagnosis difficult. The most common features include

- Immune dysregulation (95%)
- Organomegaly (86%)
- Recurrent infections (71%)
- Hypogammaglobulinemia (57%)
- Granulomatous lymphocytic interstitial lung disease (38%)

There is also a tendency to develop inflammatory bowel disease.

== Genetics ==
The LBRA gene is located on the long arm of chromosome 4 (4q31.3).

== Pathogenesis ==
LBRA protein interacts with the protein CTLA4. The absence of LBRA increases the turnover of CTLA4 and interferes with vesicle trafficking.

== Diagnosis ==
=== Differential diagnosis ===
- Common variable immunodeficiency
- IPEX syndrome

== Management ==
Along with treatment for infections and other complications several additional treatments have been tried. These include hematopoietic stem cell transplantation, immunoglobulin replacement and immunosuppressive treatment.

== History ==
This condition was first described in 2012.
