= Autoimmune oophoritis =

- Specialty: Gynecology

Autoimmune oophoritis is a rare autoimmune disease where the body's own immune system attacks the ovaries. This causes the ovaries to have inflammation, atrophy, and fibrosis. Such changes in the ovaries can cause them to not function properly. This disease is caused by primary ovarian insufficiency (POI), where reproduction and hormonal function of the ovaries stops before the age of 40.

== Signs and symptoms ==
Autoimmune oophoritis can present with a wide variety of symptoms. It begins with the main symptom, which is amenorrhea, where there is an irregular or no menstrual period at all. Other symptoms are related to ovarian cysts, and more common ones are also listed below. A variation of symptoms can occur together, however, that depends on the person and the severity of the disease.

- Primary amenorrhea
  - This amenorrhea is more specific to menstruation never occurring before.
- Secondary amenorrhea
  - This type of amenorrhea is where menstruation occurred once puberty began but then suddenly stopped later on.
- Infertility
- Cramping
- Bloating
- Nausea
- Vomiting
- Sex hormone deficiency
- Hot flushes
- Lower abdominal pain
- Fever
- Malaise
- Vaginal discharge
- Symptoms associated with other coexisting autoimmune conditions

== Causes ==
The underlying cause of autoimmune oophoritis is yet unknown. However, it is known that it can co-exist with lupus, pernicious anemia, myasthenia gravis, or other autoimmune conditions. Autoimmune oophoritis can also be associated with autoimmune endocrinopathy syndrome type I and type II. These conditions can coexists because they are all autoimmune diseases, this is called polyautoimmunity. There are some environmental causes for autoimmune diseases that have been discovered in different studies. Those consist of exposures to chemicals in the environment, such as vinyl chloride, metals, mycotoxins, and organic compounds.

== Genetics ==
As Autoimmune oophoritis often occurs in the setting of autoimmune polyendocrine syndromes (APS), mutations in AIRE or HLA-DR3/4 can contribute to its pathology.

== Mechanism/ Pathophysiology ==
There is no set mechanism specifically for autoimmune oophoritis, but it is known that microscopic examinations reveal a picture of inflammatory infiltrate. Selectively attacking the developing follicles and corpus luteum with sparing of the primordial follicles. However, since it is an autoimmune disease, it occurs when the immune system develops a response against one or more of the body's normal functions as if they were harmful. Then, the immune system fails to differentiate between "self" and "non-self", therefore it begins to develop antibodies. Antibodies target its own cells, tissues, and organs. Antibodies are made by the immune system as a response to an infection. They are produced by B cells, which are made in the bone marrow and found in the blood. Antibodies are Y-shaped which allows them to work properly because that is how their unique sites bind with a matching site on antigens. That is where they destroy them. Research has shown that Theca cells could be part of a potential mechanism but more research should be done to verify the results.

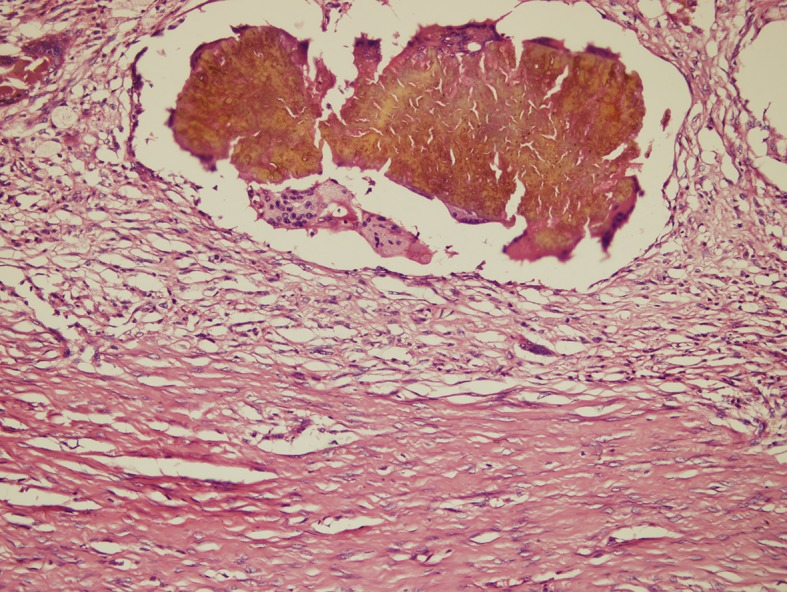

== Diagnosis ==
Diagnosis includes a blood test that looks for anti-steroid or anti-ovarian antibodies in the bloodstream to confirm infertility in the female. Antibodies result as a response to an infection that the body has already fought. Anti-ovarian antibodies are found against the ovaries, they bind to the working sites of the ovaries. According to research anti-ovarian antibodies cause malfunctions in the ovulation process. Pelvic ultrasounds are also done to look for enlarged cystic ovaries. In other cases biopsies may be required in order to confirm the diagnosis. Other type of tests could be done to rule out other issues that can be a part of primary ovarian insufficiency (POI).

== Prevention/Treatment ==
There is no specific treatment for autoimmune oophoritis yet. Nor is there an immunosuppressive that has shown to be effective and safe. However, affected women are usually started on hormone replacement therapies, or corticosteroids to achieve immunosuppression. A few risk factors associated with the hormone replacement therapies are: breast cancer, endometrial cancer, and ovarian cancer. Women with this disease need a lot of emotional support and should maintain a management of other autoimmune conditions.

== Prognosis ==
The prognosis is difficult to evaluate given the rarity of this condition, some patients with autoimmune oophoritis may have intermittent ovarian follicle function and may ovulate spontaneously. Allowing them to menstruate normally and even achieve pregnancy after therapy.

== Epidemiology ==
Autoimmune oophoritis accounts for almost 4% of women who present with primary ovarian insufficiency (POI). However, due to the lack of awareness and systematic studies, the ethnicity related prevalence is not known yet. Since autoimmune oophoritis is listed as a "rare disease" by the Office of Rare Diseases (ORD) of the National Institutes of Health (NIH), it means that less than 200,000 women in the United States are affected by it.

== Research ==
In 2015 a research was done on the role of autoimmunity in premature ovarian failure. In 2014 there was an ovarian autoimmune disease research that revealed at least two mechanisms that protect the ovary from an autoimmune attack. Research showed that Theca cells were targeting the autoimmune deficiency within the ovary. And in 2011, a research was done on a patient who suffered from myasthenia gravis (MG) in conjunction with autoimmune oophoritis whose premature ovarian insufficiency was cured without hormonal therapy, only after thymectomy. The study suggests treatment of MG including thymectomy could cure ovarian failure and hormonal therapy may not be necessary.
