= Dmitry Gabrilovich =

Soviet-American immunologist (born 1961)

- Born: May 24, 1961 (age 65); Minsk, USSR
- Occupations: Researcher, professor
- Years active: 1984–present

Dmitry Gabrilovich (born May 24, 1961) is currently a Chief Scientist, Cancer Immunology at AstraZeneca, out of Gaithersburg. His research is focused on methods by which tumors are able to suppress the immune system and how to develop new immune therapies to combat this ability. Gabrilovich described the defective ability of dendritic cells in induce immune responses in cancer, and was one of the discoverers of myeloid-derived suppressor cells (MDSC). The Gabrilovich lab focuses on immature myeloid cell biology and its relation to cancer. MDSC have been linked to a number of signaling pathways associated with cancer, including NF-κB, Jak-STAT, Notch, Wnt, and Rb, among others. His research has found that tumor cells can go through a mechanism that produces a free radical peroxynitrite, causing them to become resistant to certain types of cancer immunotherapy. His research has also focused on monocytic-myeloid derived suppressor cells and polymorphonuclear-myeloid derived suppressor cells and what impact they might have on cancer therapy, since myeloid derived suppressor cells negatively regulate anti-tumor activity. His group described methods of targeting suppressive myeloid cell. In 2019 he was awarded title of Research Professor by American Cancer Society. Prior to joining AstraZeneca, Gabrilovich was a researcher and Christopher M. Davis professor at The Wistar Institute in Philadelphia. Prior to joining The Wistar Institute, Gabrilovich was a senior member at the Moffitt Cancer Center in Tampa.

== Selected publications ==
Some of Gabrilovich's most-cited publications include:

- Gabrilovich, Dmitry I.; Nagaraj, Srinivas (March 2009). "Myeloid-derived suppressor cells as regulators of the immune system". Nature Reviews Immunology. 9 (3): 162–174. doi:10.1038/nri2506. ISSN 1474-1733. PMC 2828349. PMID 19197294.
- Gabrilovich, Dmitry I.; Ostrand-Rosenberg, Suzanne; Bronte, Vincenzo (April 2012). "Coordinated regulation of myeloid cells by tumours". Nature Reviews Immunology. 12 (4): 253–268. doi:10.1038/nri3175. ISSN 1474-1733. PMC 3587148. PMID 22437938.
- Gabrilovich, Dmitry I.; Chen, Hailei L.; Girgis, Khaled R.; Cunningham, H. Thomas; Meny, Geralyn M.; Nadaf, Sorena; Kavanaugh, Denise; Carbone, David P. (1996-10-01). "Production of vascular endothelial growth factor by human tumors inhibits the functional maturation of dendritic cells". Nature Medicine. 2 (10): 1096–1103. doi:10.1038/nm1096-1096. ISSN 1078-8956. PMID 8837607. S2CID 11533801.
