= Abdominal Radiology =

- Discipline: Diagnostic imaging, gastroenterology
- Language: English
- Edited by: Neeraj Lalwani

Publication details
- Former name(s): Abdominal Imaging
- History: 1976–present
- Publisher: Springer Science+Business Media
- Frequency: Monthly
- Impact factor: 2.2 (2024)

Standard abbreviations
- ISO 4: Abdom. Radiol.
- NLM: Abdom Radiol (NY)

Indexing
- ISSN: 2366-004X (print); 2366-0058 (web)

Links
- Journal homepage; Online archive

Abdominal Radiology is a monthly peer-reviewed medical journal published by Springer Science+Business Media and an official journal of the Society of Abdominal Radiology. According to the Journal Citation Reports, the journal has a 2024 impact factor of 2.4. The journal was formerly known as Abdominal Imaging. The editor-in-chief is Neeraj Lalwani.
