= Autoimmune polyendocrine syndrome type 1 =

Autoimmune condition causing dysfunction of endocrine glands

- Other names: Autoimmune polyendocrinopathy-candidiasis–ectodermal dystrophy/dysplasia (APECED), Autoimmune polyglandular syndrome type 1, Whitaker syndrome, Candidiasis-hypoparathyroidism–Addison's disease syndrome
- Autoimmune polyendocrine syndrome type 1 is autosomal recessive
- Specialty: Endocrinology, medical genetics
- Symptoms: chronic mucocutaneous candidiasis
- Causes: mutation in AIRE gene
- Diagnostic method: CT scan, biopsy
- Treatment: hormone therapy, antifungals, immunosuppression

Autoimmune polyendocrine syndrome type 1 (APS-1), is a subtype of autoimmune polyendocrine syndrome (autoimmune polyglandular syndrome). It causes the dysfunction of multiple endocrine glands due to autoimmunity. It is a genetic disorder, inherited in autosomal recessive fashion due to a defect in the AIRE gene (autoimmune regulator), which is located on chromosome 21 and normally confers immune tolerance.

== Signs and symptoms ==
APS-1 tends to cause severe symptoms. These are present from early in life, usually around 3.5 years of age. Common symptoms of APS-1 include:

- Chronic mucocutaneous candidiasis.
- Hypoparathyroidism.
- Addison's disease.
- Ectodermal dystrophy (skin, dental enamel, and nails).

APS-1 may also cause:

- Autoimmune hepatitis.
- Hypogonadism.
- Vitiligo.
- Alopecia.
- Malabsorption.
- Pernicious anemia.
- Cataract.
- Cerebellar ataxia.

== Cause ==
Chromosome 21

APS-1 is caused by a mutation in the AIRE gene, encoding a protein called autoimmune regulator. This is found on the 21q22.3 chromosome location, hence chromosome 21. The AIRE gene may be affected by any of at least 186 mutations. APS-1 may be inherited in an autosomal recessive manner.

Different mutations are more common in different geographic regions. R139X is a common mutation in Sardinia. R257* is a common mutation in Finland. Both of these mutations are nonsense mutations: the asterisk and the "X" both indicate a stop codon. A 13-base-pair deletion in the AIRE gene, c.967-979del13bp, has been identified in APS-1 patients in Norway, Britain and North America.

== Mechanism ==
APS-1 is due to problems with immune tolerance. APS-1 causes considerable reactions with both interferon omega and interferon alpha. There may also be a reaction against interleukin 22. This leads to damage to endocrine organs. Common problems include hypercalcaemia and nephrocalcinosis (due to a lack of calcitonin from the thyroid), and pituitary problems (such as growth hormone deficiency). Antibodies against NLRP5 may lead to hypoparathyroidism.

== Diagnosis ==
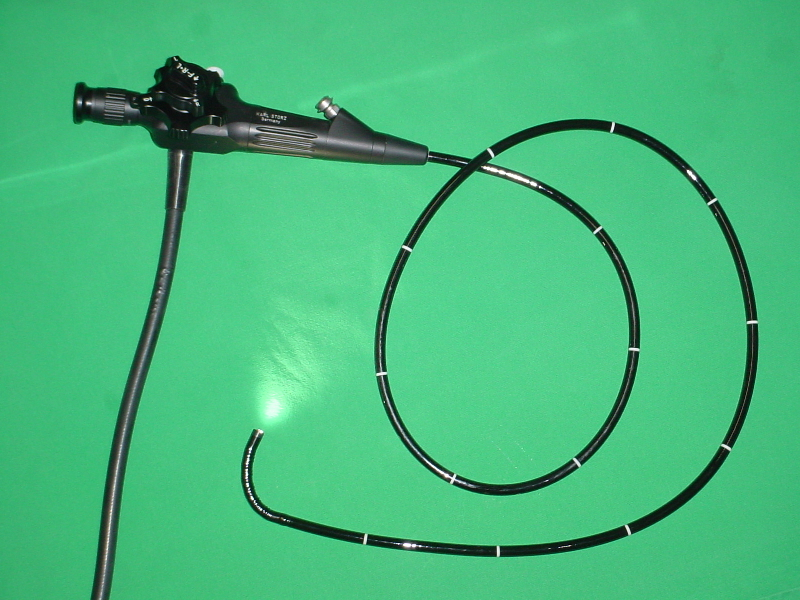
Endoscope

Diagnosis of APS-1 is based on a number of tests, including endoscopy, a CT scan, a biopsy (with histological testing), and serum endocrine autoantibody screening.

== Treatment ==
Autoimmune polyendocrine syndrome type 1 treatment is based on the symptoms that are presented by the affected individual. Treatments may involve hormone therapy, systemic antifungal treatments, and immunosuppression. The JAK-STAT inhibitor ruxolitinib is being investigated as a treatment specifically for its normalizing effect on interferon-gamma.

== History ==
APS-1 may also be known as autoimmunity endocrinopathy candidiasis ectodermal dystrophy / dysplasia (APECED), autoimmune polyglandular syndrome type 1, Whitaker syndrome, or candidiasis-hypoparathyroidism-Addison's disease syndrome.

== See also ==
- Autoimmune polyendocrine syndrome type 2
- IPEX syndrome
- Autoimmune polyendocrine syndrome
