= Lymphoproliferative response =

Type of immune response

Lymphoproliferative response is a specific immune response that entails rapid T-cell replication. Standard antigens, such as tetanus toxoid, that elicit this response are used in lab tests of immune competence.
