= Testicular immunology =

Testicular Immunology is the study of the immune system within the testis. It includes an investigation of the effects of infection, inflammation and immune factors on testicular function. Two unique characteristics of testicular immunology are evident: (1) the testis is described as an immunologically privileged site, where suppression of immune responses occurs; and, (2) some factors which normally lead to inflammation are present at high levels in the testis, where they regulate the development of sperm instead of promoting inflammation.

== History of testicular immunology ==
- 460-377 BC Hippocrates described testicular inflammation associated with mumps
- 1785 Hunter and Michaelis performed transplant experiments in domestic chickens
- 1849 Berthold transplanted testes between roosters and showed maintenance of male sex characteristics only in birds with successfully grafted testes
- 1899-1900 Sperm recognized as immunogenic (will cause an autoimmune reaction if transplanted from the testis into a different area of the body) by Landsteiner (1899) and Metchinikoff, (1900)
- 1913-1914 Human testis transplants performed by Lespinasse (1913), and Lydson (1914) who performed a graft on himself!
- 1954 Discovery that sperm autoantibodies contribute to infertility,
- 1977 Billingham recognized that the testis is site of immune privilege

== Immune cells found in the testis ==
Immune cells of the human testis are not as well characterized as those from rodents, due to the rarity of normal human testes available for experiment. The majority of experiments have studied the rat testis due to its convenience: it is of relatively large size and is easily extracted from experimental animals.

=== Macrophages ===
Macrophages are directly involved in the fight against invading micro-organisms as well as being antigen-presenting cells which activate lymphocytes. Early studies demonstrated the presence of macrophages in the rat testis Testicular macrophages are the largest population of immune cells in the rodent testis. Macrophages have also been found in the testes of humans, guinea pigs, hamsters, boars, horses and bulls. They originate from blood monocytes which move into the testis then mature into macrophages. In the rat, testicular macrophages have been described as either “resident” or “newly arrived” from the blood supply. It is likely that most of the adult population of testicular macrophages in adult rats are a result of very rapid proliferation of early precursors that entered the testis during postnatal maturation

Testicular macrophages can respond to infectious stimuli and become activated (undergo changes enabling the killing of the invading micro-organism), but do so to a lesser extent than other types of macrophages. An example is production of the inflammatory cytokines TNFα and IL-1β by activated rat testicular macrophages: these macrophages produce significantly less TNFα and IL-1β than activated rat peritoneal macrophages. Aside from responding to infectious stimuli, testicular macrophages are also involved in maintaining normal testis function. They have been shown to secrete 25-hydroxycholesterol, a sterol that can be converted to testosterone by Leydig cells. Their presence is necessary for the normal development and function of the Leydig cells, which are the testosterone-producing cells of the testis.

=== B-Lymphocytes ===
B-lymphocytes take part in the adaptive immune response and produce antibodies. These cells are not normally found in the testis, even during inflammatory conditions. The lack of B-lymphocytes in the testis is significant, since these are the antibody-producing cells of the immune system. Since anti-sperm antibodies can cause infertility, it is important that antibody-producing B-lymphocytes are kept separated from the testis.

=== T-lymphocytes ===
T-lymphocytes (T-cells) are white blood cells which take part in cell-mediated immunity. They are often found within tissues where they can be activated by antigen-presenting cells upon infection. They are present in rat and human testes, where they constitute approximately 10 to 20% of the immune cells present, as well as mouse and ram testes. Both cytotoxic T-cells and Helper T cells are found in the testes of rats. Also present in the testes of rats and humans are natural killer cells and Natural killer T cells have been found in rats and mice.

=== Mast cells ===
Mast cells are regulators of immune responses, particularly those against parasites. They are also involved in the development of autoimmune diseases and allergies. Mast cells have been found in relatively low numbers in the testes of humans, rats, mice, dogs, cats, bulls, boars and deer. In the mammalian testis mast cells regulate testosterone production. There are two lines of evidence that restriction of mast cell activation in the testis could be beneficial during treatment of inflammatory conditions; (1) In experimental models of testicular inflammation, mast cells were present in 10-fold greater numbers and showed signs of activation, and (2) Treatment with drugs which stabilize mast cell activation has proved beneficial in treating some types of male infertility.

=== Eosinophils ===
Eosinophils directly fight parasitic infections and are involved in allergic reactions. They have been found in relatively low numbers in the rat, mouse, dog, cat, bull and deer testes. Almost nothing is known about their significance or function in the testis.

=== Dendritic cells ===
Dendritic cells initiate adaptive immune responses. Relatively small amounts of dendritic cells have been found in the testes of humans, rats and mice. The functional role of dendritic cells in the testis is not well understood, although they have been shown to be involved in autoimmune orchitis during animal experiments. When autoimmune orchitis is induced in rats, the dendritic cell population of the testis greatly increases. This is likely to contribute to testicular inflammation, considering the well-established role of dendritic cells in other types of autoimmune inflammation.

=== Neutrophils ===
Neutrophils are white blood cells which are present in the blood but not normally in tissues. They move out from the blood into tissues and organs upon infection or damage. They directly fight invading pathogens such as bacteria. Neutrophils are not found in the rodent testis under normal conditions but can enter from the blood supply upon infection or inflammatory stimulus. This has been demonstrated in the rat after injection with bacterial cell wall components to produce an immune reaction. Neutrophils also enter the rat testis after treatment with hormones that increase the permeability of blood vessels. In humans, neutrophils have been found in the testis when associated with some tumors. In rat experiments, testicular torsion leads to neutrophil entry into the testis. Neutrophil activity in the testis is an inflammatory response which needs to be tightly regulated by the body, since inflammation-induced damage to the testis can lead to infertility. It is assumed that the role of the immunosuppressive environment of the testis is to protect developing sperm from inflammation.

== Immune privilege in the testis ==
Sperm are immunogenic - that is they will cause an autoimmune reaction if transplanted from the testis into a different part of the body. This has been demonstrated in experiments using rats by Landsteiner (1899) and Metchinikoff (1900), mice and guinea pigs. The likely reason for this is that sperm first mature at puberty, after immune tolerance is established, therefore the body recognizes them as foreign and mounts an immune reaction against them. Therefore, mechanisms for their protection must exist in this organ to prevent any autoimmune reaction. The blood-testis barrier is likely to contribute to the survival of sperm. However, it is believed in the field of testicular immunology that the blood-testis barrier cannot account for all immune suppression in the testis, due to (1) its incompleteness at a region called the rete testis and (2) the presence of immunogenic molecules outside the blood-testis barrier, on the surface of spermatogonia. Another mechanism which is likely to protect sperm is the suppression of immune responses in the testis. Both the suppression of immune responses and the increased survival of grafts in the testis have led to its recognition as an immunologically privileged site. Other immunologically privileged sites include the eye, brain and uterus.

The two main features of immune privilege in the rat testis are;

- a diminishment in the activation of testicular macrophages by infections such as bacteria, and
- a defect in the activation of T-cells when antigen is presented to them, leading to the absence of an adaptive immune response to sperm in the testis.

It is also predicted that the high level of inflammatory cytokines in the testis contributes to immune privilege.

=== Immune privilege in rodents and other experimental animals ===
The existence of immune privilege in the testes of rodents is well accepted, due to many experiments demonstrating prolonged, and sometimes indefinite, survival of tissue transplanted into the testis, or testicular tissue transplanted elsewhere. Evidence includes the tolerance of testicular grafts in mice and rats, as well as the increased survival of transplants of pancreatic insulin-producing cells in rats, when cells from the testes (Sertoli cells) are added to the transplanted material. Complete spermatogenesis, forming functional pig or goat sperm, can be established by the grafting of pig or goat testicular tissue onto the backs of mice - however, immunodeficient mice needed to be used.

=== Immune privilege in humans ===
The presence of immune-privilege in the human testis is controversial and insufficient evidence exists to either confirm or rule out this phenomenon.

- Evidence for human/primate testicular immune privilege:

Sperm are protected from autoimmune attack, which when it occurs in humans leads to infertility. Local injury of seminiferous tubules caused by fine-needle biopsies in humans does not cause testicular inflammation (orchitis). Furthermore, human testis cells tolerate early HIV infection with little response.

- Evidence against human/primate testicular immune-privilege:

In transplant experiments, primate testes fail to support grafts of monkey thyroid tissue. Human testis tissue transplanted into the mouse elicited an immune response and was rejected, however, this immune response was not as extensive as that against other types of grafted tissue.

=== How does the testis suppress immune responses? ===
How the testicular environment suppresses the immune response is only partially understood. Recent experiments have uncovered a number of biological processes that most likely contribute to immune privilege in the testes of rodents:

- 1. Experiments in the rat have shown that Sertoli cells can help protect from graft rejection. These cells were isolated from the testis, then added to transplants of the insulin-producing cells of the pancreas (islets of Langerhans), resulting in increased graft survival. Molecules released by the Sertoli cells are predicted to protect the graft.
- 2. It is likely that the testicular environment itself is inhibiting the activation of T-cells, in order to protect the developing sperm which are immunogenic. The fluid present in the testis is a potent inhibitor of the activation of T-cells under laboratory conditions.
- 3. The diminishment of the testis inflammatory response is likely to result from relatively low levels of inflammatory cytokines released by activated testicular macrophages.

Since protection of developing sperm is so important to the survival of a species, it would not be surprising if more than one mechanism were in use.

== Immune factors regulate normal testis function ==
Curiously, the testis contains factors such as cytokines, which are usually only produced upon infections and tissue damage. The cytokines interleukin-1α (IL-1α), IL-6 and Activin A are found in the testis, often at high levels. In other tissues, these cytokine would promote inflammation, but here they control testis function. They regulate the development of sperm by controlling their cell division and survival.

Other immune factors found in the testis include the enzyme inducible nitric oxide synthase (iNOS), and its product nitric oxide (NO), transforming growth factor beta (TGFβ), the enzyme cyclooxygenase-2 (COX-2) and its product prostaglandin E2, and many others. Further research is required to define the functional roles of these immune factors in the testis.

== The effects of infections and immune responses on the testis ==
=== Mumps ===
Mumps is a viral disease which causes swelling of the salivary glands and testes. The mumps virus lives in the upper respiratory tract and spreads through direct contact with saliva. Prior to widespread vaccination programs, it was a common childhood disease. Mumps is generally not serious in children, but in adults, where sperm have matured in the testis, it can cause more severe complications, such as infertility.

=== Sexually transmitted diseases ===
Gonorrhea is a sexually transmitted disease caused by the bacteria Niesseria gonorrhea which can lead to testicular pain and swelling. Gonorrhea also infects the female reproductive system around the cervix and uterus, and can grow in the mouth, throat, eyes and anus. It can be effectively treated with antibiotics, however, if untreated, gonorrhea can cause infertility in men. Chlamydia is caused by the sexually transmitted bacteria Chlamydia trachomatis which infects the genitals. It more commonly affects women, and if untreated, can lead to pelvic inflammatory disease and infertility. Serious symptoms in men are rare, but include swollen testicles and an unusual discharge from the penis. It is effectively treated with antibiotics.

=== Antisperm antibodies ===
Antisperm antibodies (ASA) have been considered as infertility cause in around 10–30% of infertile couples. ASA production are directed against surface antigens on sperm, which can interfere with sperm motility and transport through the female reproductive tract, inhibiting capacitation and acrosome reaction, impaired fertilization, influence on the implantation process, and impaired growth and development of the embryo. Risk factors for the formation of antisperm antibodies in men include the breakdown of the blood‑testis barrier, trauma and surgery, orchitis, varicocele, infections, prostatitis, testicular cancer, failure of immunosuppression and unprotected receptive anal or oral sex with men.

=== Testicular torsion ===
Testicular torsion is a condition of physical twisting of the testis which results in cutting off the blood supply. It leads to damage that, if not treated within a few hours, causes the death of testicular tissue, and requires removal of the testis to prevent gangrene, and therefore can cause infertility.

=== Autoimmune orchitis ===
Orchitis is a condition of testicular pain involving swelling, inflammation and possibly infection. Orchitis can be caused by an autoimmune reaction (autoimmune orchitis) leading to a reduction in fertility. Autoimmune orchitis is rare in humans, compared to anti-sperm antibodies. To study orchitis in the testis, autoimmune orchitis has been induced in the rodent testis. The disease starts with the appearance of testicular antibodies, then movement of macrophages and lymphocytes from the blood stream into the testis, breaking of the physical interactions between the developing sperm and Sertoli cells, entry of neutrophils or eosinophils, and finally death of the developing sperm, leading to infertility.

=== Inflammation models in the rodent ===
Experiments in rats have examined, in fine detail, the course of testicular events during a bacterial infection. In the short term (3 hours) multiple inflammatory factors are produced and released by testicular macrophages. Examples are prostaglandin E2, inducible nitric oxide synthase (iNOS), TNFα and IL-1β, although at lower levels than other tissues. Non-immune cells of the testis such as Sertoli cells and Leydig cells also able to respond to bacteria. During a bacterial infection, testosterone levels and the amount of testicular interstitial fluid are reduced. Neutrophils enter the testis about 12 hours after infection. Importantly, there is damage to the developing sperm, which start to die under severe infections. Despite all the data on the effects of bacteria on normal testis parameters, there is little experimental data regarding its effect on rodent fertility.

=== Other diseases where testicular inflammation can be a symptom ===
Testicular inflammation can be a symptom of the following diseases: Coxsackie A virus, varicella (chicken pox) human immunodeficiency virus (HIV), dengue fever, Epstein Barr virus-associated infectious mononucleosis, syphilis, leprosy, tuberculosis.
