= Ligneous conjunctivitis =

- Other names: Conjunctivitis lignosa
- Specialty: Ophthalmology

Ligneous conjunctivitis is a rare form of chronic conjunctivitis characterized by recurrent, fibrin-rich pseudomembranous lesions of wood-like consistency that develop mainly on the underside of the eyelid (tarsal conjunctiva). It is generally a systemic disease which may involve the periodontal tissue, the upper and lower respiratory tract, kidneys, middle ear, and female genitalia. It can be sight-threatening, and death can occasionally occur from pulmonary involvement.

It has been speculated hola ligneous conjunctivitis may be a manifestation of IgG4-related disease (IgG4-RD) involving the conjunctiva.

== Pathogenesis ==
Histopathological findings from affected humans indicate that wound healing is impaired due to a deficiency in plasmin-mediated extracellular fibrinolysis. Episodes may be triggered by minor trauma, eye surgery, or by systemic events such as infections or antifibrinolytic therapy. Histology shows amorphous subepithelial deposits of eosinophilic material consisting predominantly of fibrin.

== Treatment ==
Ligneous conjunctivitis may be managed by topical treatments of plasminogen, topical and subconjunctival fresh frozen plasma, and fibrinolytic therapy.
