= LRBA =

Protein-coding gene in the species Homo sapiens

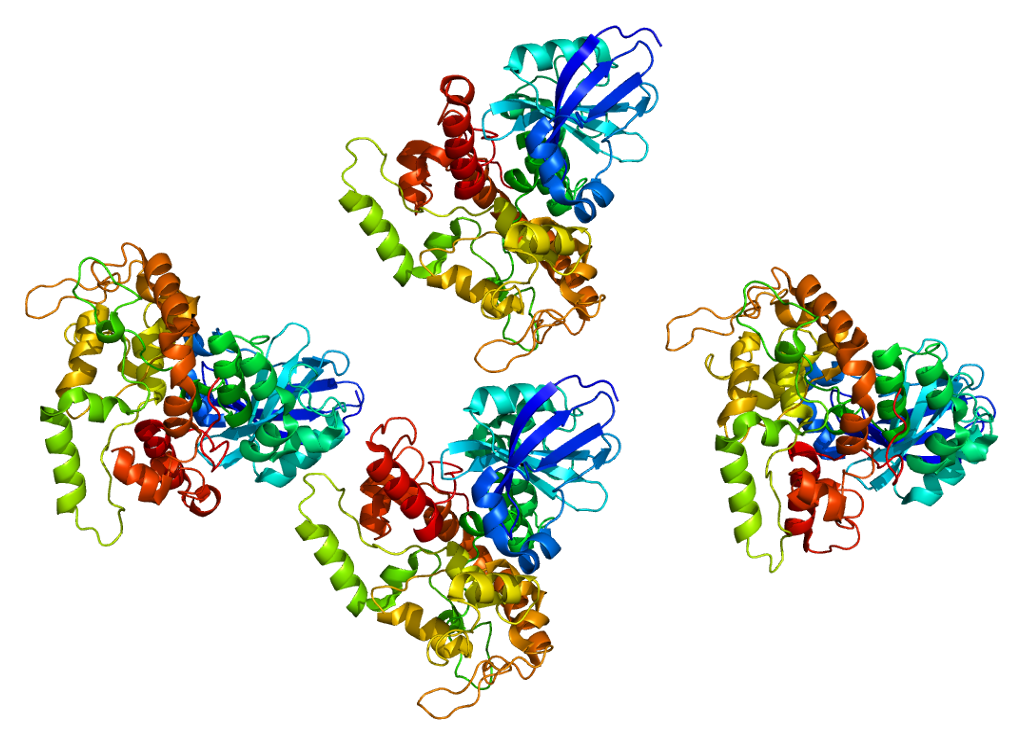

Identifiers
- Aliases: LRBA, BGL, CDC4L, CVID8, LAB300, LBA, LPS responsive beige-like anchor protein
- External IDs: OMIM: 606453; MGI: 1933162; GeneCards: LRBA
Available structures
PDB	Ortholog search: PDBe RCSB
PDB	List of PDB id codes 1T77

Gene location (Human)
Chr.	Chromosome 4 (human)
Band	4q31.3	Start	150,264,435 bp
Band	4q31.3	End	151,015,727 bp

Gene location (Mouse)
Chr.	Chromosome 3 (mouse)
Band	3|3 F1	Start	86,131,987 bp
Band	3|3 F1	End	86,689,999 bp
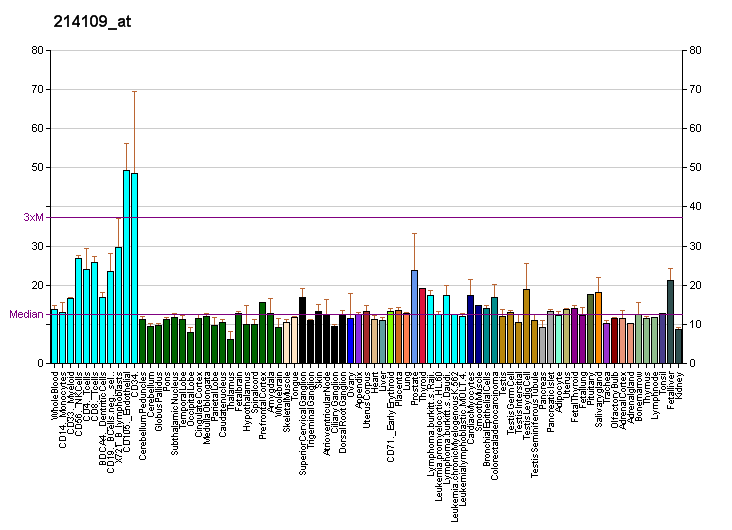

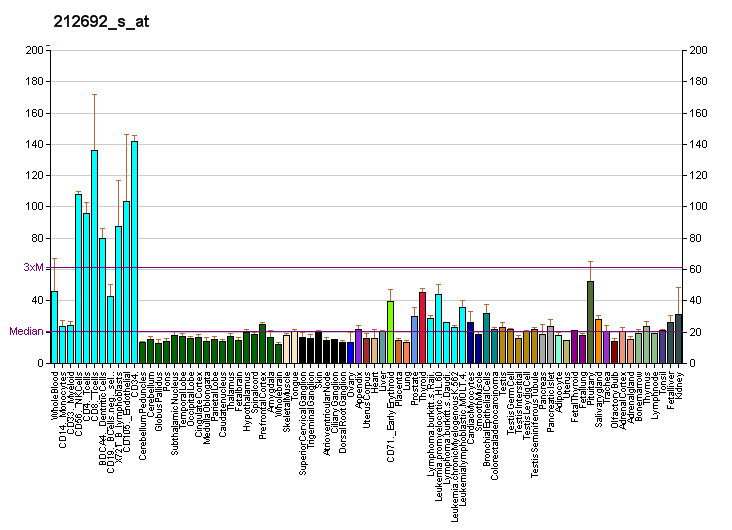
RNA expression pattern
Bgee	Human / Mouse (ortholog); Top expressed in: skin of thigh; bronchial epithelial cell; epithelium of colon; gingival epithelium; epithelium of nasopharynx; corpus epididymis; right uterine tube; Epithelium of choroid plexus; retinal pigment epithelium; skin of hip / Top expressed in: ciliary body; ankle; retinal pigment epithelium; utricle; vestibular sensory epithelium; olfactory epithelium; iris; vestibular membrane of cochlear duct; temporal muscle; urothelium; More reference expression data
BioGPS	More reference expression data
Gene ontology
Molecular function	molecular function
Cellular component	integral component of membrane; plasma membrane; Golgi apparatus; lysosome; endoplasmic reticulum; membrane
Biological process	biological process
Sources:Amigo / QuickGO
Orthologs
Databases	NCBI: entry; OMA: entry
Species	Human	Mouse
Entrez	987	80877
Ensembl	ENSG00000198589	ENSMUSG00000028080
UniProt	P50851	Q9ESE1
RefSeq (mRNA)	NM_001199282; NM_006726; NM_001364905; NM_001367550	NM_001077687; NM_001077688; NM_030695
RefSeq (protein)	NP_001186211; NP_006717; NP_001351834; NP_001354479	NP_001071155; NP_001071156; NP_109620
Location (UCSC)	Chr 4: 150.26 – 151.02 Mb	Chr 3: 86.13 – 86.69 Mb
PubMed search
- Wikidata
View/Edit Human	View/Edit Mouse

Lipopolysaccharide-responsive and beige-like anchor protein is a protein that in humans is encoded by the LRBA gene.

Patients with Chediak-Higashi syndrome (CHS1; MIM 214500) suffer from a systemic immunodeficiency involving defects in polarized trafficking of vesicles in a number of immune system cell types. In mouse, this syndrome is reproduced in strains with a mutation in the 'beige' gene that results in proteins lacking the BEACH (beige and CHS1) domain and C-terminal WD repeats. LRBA contains key features of both beige/CHS1 and A kinase anchor proteins (AKAPs; see MIM 602449).[supplied by OMIM]

Deficiency of this protein in humans causes the condition known as LPS-responsive beige-like anchor protein deficiency.
