= Autoimmune polyendocrine syndrome =

- Other names: Autoimmune polyglandular syndromes (APSs)
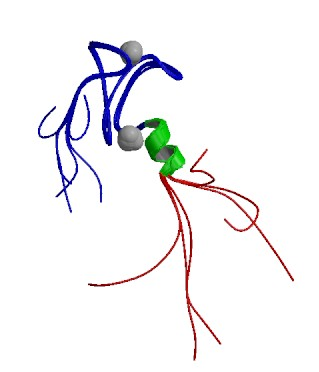
- The autoimmune regulator protein (from the AIRE gene, which causes autoimmune polyendocrine syndrome type 1 when non-functional)
- Specialty: Endocrinology
- Types: APS type1, APS type 2, IPEX syndrome
- Causes: FOXP3 gene is involved in the mechanism
- Diagnostic method: Endoscopic, CT scan
- Treatment: Depends on type

Autoimmune polyendocrine syndromes (APSs), also called polyglandular autoimmune syndromes (PGASs) or polyendocrine autoimmune syndromes (PASs), are a heterogeneous group of rare diseases characterized by autoimmune activity against more than one endocrine organ, although non-endocrine organs can be affected. There are three types of APS, and there are a number of other diseases which involve endocrine autoimmunity.

== Types ==
- Autoimmune polyendocrine syndrome type 1, an autosomal recessive syndrome due to mutation of the AIRE gene resulting in hypoparathyroidism, adrenal insufficiency, hypogonadism, vitiligo, candidiasis and others.
- Autoimmune polyendocrine syndrome type 2, an autosomal dominant syndrome due to multifactorial gene involvement resulting in adrenal insufficiency plus hypothyroidism and/or type 1 diabetes.
- Immunodysregulation polyendocrinopathy enteropathy X-linked syndrome (IPEX syndrome) is X-linked recessive due to mutation of the FOXP3 gene on the X chromosome. Most patients develop diabetes and diarrhea and many die due to autoimmune activity against many organs. Boys are affected, while girls are carriers and might experience mild disease.

== Cause ==
Each "type" of this condition has a different genetic cause. IPEX syndrome is inherited in males by an X-linked recessive process. The FOXP3 gene, whose cytogenetic location is Xp11.23, is involved in the mechanism of the IPEX condition.

== Diagnosis ==
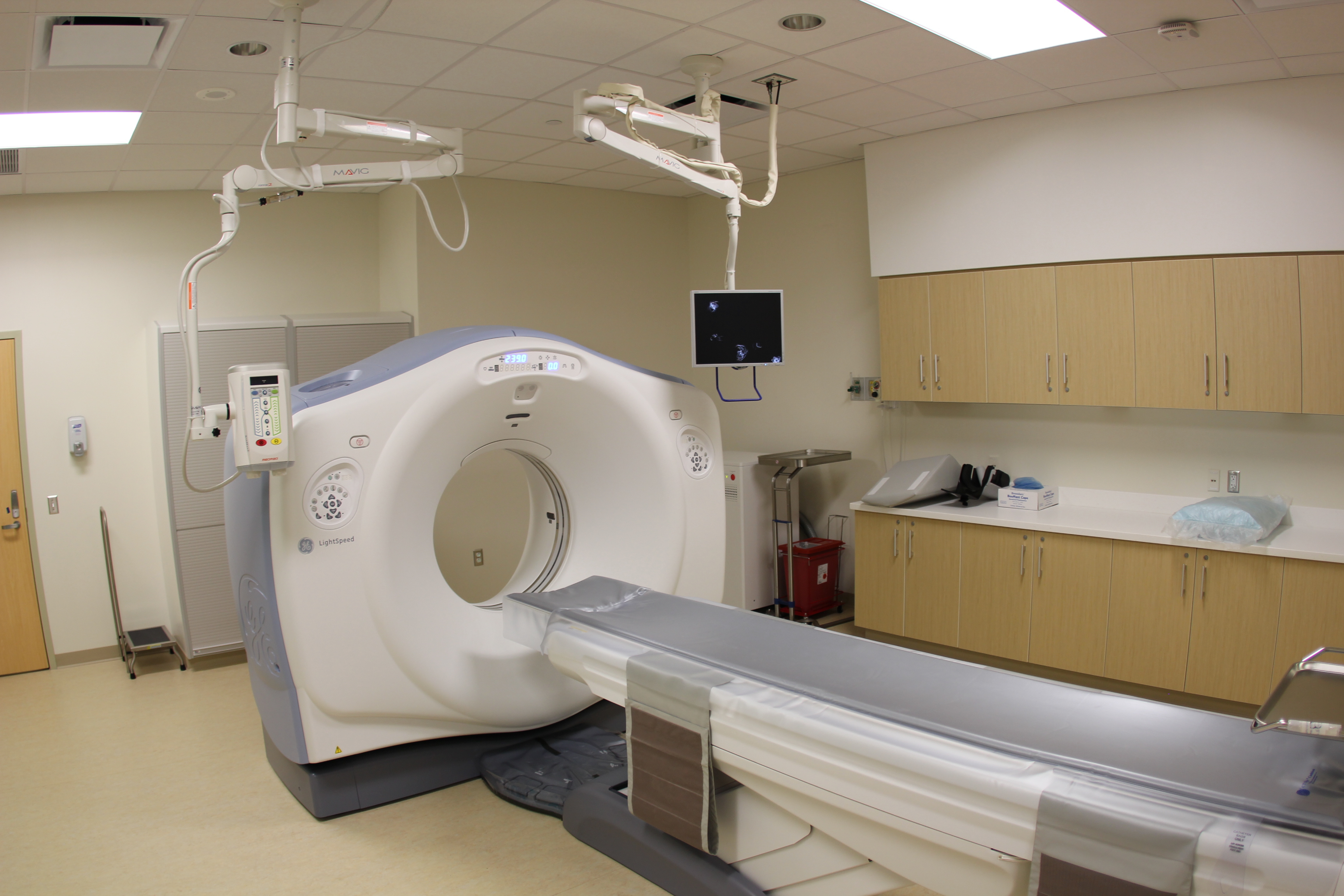
CT scan

Diagnosis for type 1 of this condition for example, sees that the following methods/tests are available:

- Endoscopic
- CT scan
- Histologic test

=== Differential diagnosis ===
For this condition, differential diagnosis sees that the following should be considered:

- CD25 deficiency
- STAT5B deficiency
- Severe combined immunodeficiency
- X linked thrombocytopenia

== Management ==
Ketoconazole

Immunosuppressive therapy may be used in type I of this condition.

Ketoconazole can also be used for type I under certain conditions.

== See also ==
- Immunosuppression
