= IPEX syndrome =

- Other names: Autoimmune enteropathy type 1
- IPEX syndrome is inherited via X-linked recessive
- Specialty: Immunology
- Symptoms: Lymphadenopathy
- Causes: FOXP3 gene mutation
- Diagnostic method: Family history, Genetic test
- Treatment: TPN(nutritional purpose), Cyclosporin A and FK506, Bone marrow transplant

Immunodysregulation polyendocrinopathy enteropathy X-linked syndrome (IPEX syndrome) is a rare autoimmune disease. It is one of the autoimmune polyendocrine syndromes. Most often, IPEX presents with autoimmune enteropathy, dermatitis (eczema), and autoimmune endocrinopathy (most often Type 1 diabetes), but other presentations exist.

IPEX is caused by mutations in the gene FOXP3, which encodes transcription factor forkhead box P3 (FOXP3). FOXP3 is widely considered to be the master regulator of the regulatory T cell (Treg) lineage. FOXP3 mutation can lead to the dysfunction of CD4^{+} Tregs. In healthy people, Tregs maintain immune homeostasis. When there is a deleterious FOXP3 mutation, Tregs do not function properly and cause autoimmunity.

IPEX onset usually happens in infancy. If left untreated, it is often fatal by the age of 2 or 3. A bone marrow transplant is generally considered the best treatment option. IPEX exclusively affects males and is inherited in an X-linked recessive manner; female carriers of pathogenic FOXP3 mutations do not have symptoms and no female cases are known.

== Presentation ==
=== Classical triad ===
The classical triad describes the most common symptoms of IPEX: intractable diarrhea, type 1 diabetes, and eczema. Symptoms usually begin shortly after birth.Other symptoms include: thyroid disease, kidney dysfunction, blood disorders, frequent infections, autoimmune hemolytic anemia, and food allergies, among others.

==== Endocrinopathy ====
The most common endocrinopathy associated with IPEX is type 1 diabetes, especially neonatal diabetes. In this type of diabetes, the immune system attacks insulin-producing cells. This makes the pancreas unable to produce insulin. Diabetes can permanently damage the pancreas.Thyroid disorders are also common.

==== Enteropathy ====
The most common enteropathy associated with IPEX is intractable diarrhea. Vomiting and gastritis are also common. Other manifestations include Celiac disease, ulcerative colitis, and ileus.

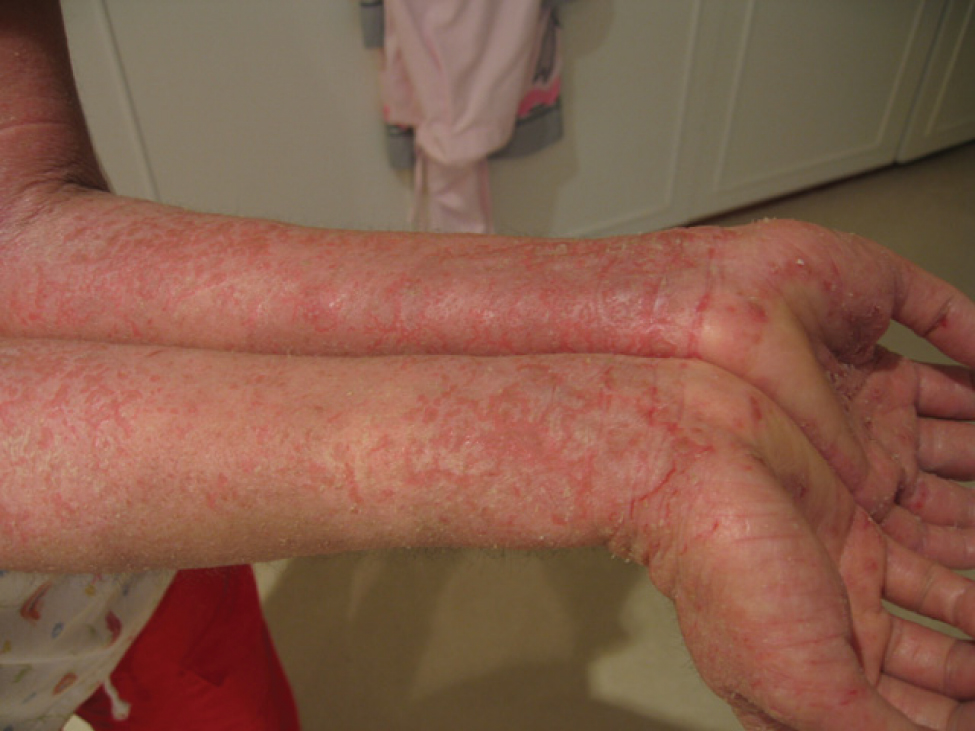
Eczema

===== Skin manifestations =====
The most common form of skin involvement is dermatitis. It can occur in three forms: eczematiform (mainly atopic dermatitis), ichthyosiform, psoriasiform, or a combination. Other skin manifestations can include cheilitis, onychodystrophy, and alopecia.

=== Early life ===
IPEX patients are usually born with normal weight and length at term. Nevertheless, the first symptoms may present in the first days of life, and some reported cases labeled newborns with intrauterine growth restriction and evidence of meconium in the amniotic fluid.

== Genetics ==
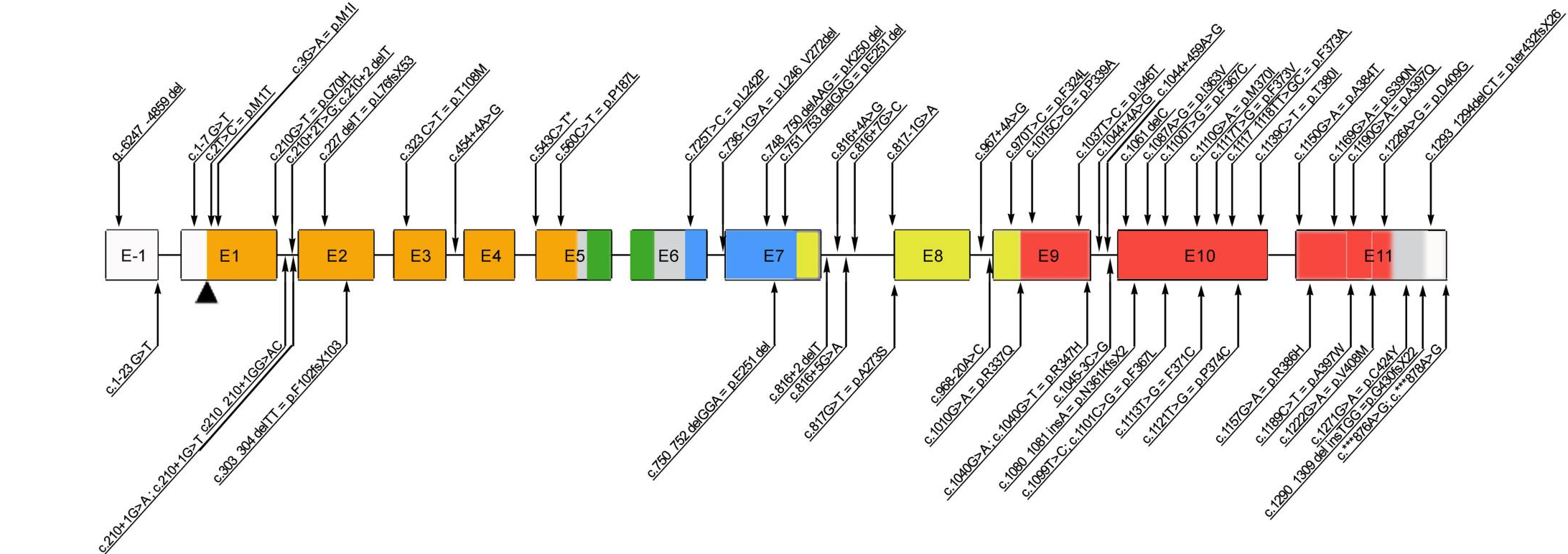
Mutations in FOXP3 gene causing IPEX syndrome - known in the year 2012.

=== FOXP3 gene ===
IPEX syndrome is inherited in males in an X-linked recessive pattern through the FOXP3 gene. FOXP3's cytogenetic location is Xp11.23. The FOXP3 gene has 12 exons and its full reading open frame encodes 431 amino acids. FOXP3 is a member of the FKH family of transcription factors and contains a proline‐rich (PRR) amino‐terminal domain, central zinc finger (ZF) and leucine zipper (LZ) domains important for protein–protein interactions. It also has a carboxyl‐terminal FKH domain required for nuclear localization and DNA‐binding activity. In humans, exons 2 and 7 may be spliced and excluded from the protein.

==== FOXP3 mutations ====
A large variety of mutations have been found, including single base substitutions, deletions, and splicing mutations. Data from 2018 describes over 70 mutations in the FOXP3 gene leading to IPEX syndrome. This number has grown dramatically in the past decade. In 2010 there were only 20 mutations of FOXP3 known in the literature. Some mutations cause FOXP3 expression to malfunction, which leads to a defect in Treg production. Those individuals do not have circulating CD4+/CD25+/FOXP3+ Treg cells. Reduced expression of FOXP3 has been described, and these individuals may express normal levels of dysfunctional protein, which leads to mild symptoms during the neonatal period or later in life. Other individuals express no FOXP3 protein. A common location for mutation of FOXP3 leading to expression of malfunctioning protein is the DNA-binding domain called the forkhead domain. The mutation makes the truncated protein unable to bind to its DNA binding site. This impairs its function concerning Treg development and functioning. The absence or dysfunction of Tregs causes autoimmune symptoms.

=== FOXP3 pathways ===
FOXP3 can function as both a repressor and a trans‐activator of T_{reg} cells depending on its interactions with other proteins. FOXP3 expression is characterised by controlling transcription, influencing epigenetic changes and post-transcriptional modifications. The N‐terminal repressor domain of FOXP3 can change transcription or epigenetic regulation of T_{reg} cells. Transcriptional activity is altered through interactions between the N-terminal domain and Eos - which associates with CtBP1 and forms a corepressor complex. This complex binds the IL2 promoter and enables FOXP3 to repress IL2 transcription in T_{reg} cells. FOXP3 forms complexes with histone deacetylase (HDAC)7, HDAC9, and the histone acetyl transferase TIP60, which alters epigenetic activity of T_{reg} cells. The N‐terminal domain of FOXP3 can also antagonize the transcription factors RORγ and RORα, thereby inhibiting TH17 cell differentiation. FOXP3 is linked to TCR signaling by downstream transcription factors. All of these findings verify the importance of FOXP3 in the regulation of transcriptional activity and repression in T_{reg} cells.

== Diagnosis ==
Early detection of the disease is crucial because IPEX has a high mortality level if left untreated. IPEX is usually diagnosed based on the following criteria:

- Clinical triad
- Family history
- Laboratory findings: elevated serum concentration of IgE, eosinophilia, autoimmune anemia and decreased number of FOXP3 Treg cells.
- Genetic testing: single-gene testing and multigene panel.

== Treatment ==
Tacrolimus

Individuals with IPEX will usually need supportive care in a hospital. Most common is nutritional treatment for enteropathy and insulin therapy for Type 1 Diabetes (T1D). IPEX treatment tends to focus on managing symptoms, reducing autoimmunity, and/or treating secondary conditions. Usually, treatment will involve immunosuppression.Drugs used include:

- Cyclosporin A
- Tacrolimus
- Sirolimus
- Rituximab

Currently, the standard treatment for IPEX is a bone marrow transplant. If donor-recipient chimerism is achieved, individuals with IPEX can achieve complete remission.

== Prognosis ==
Because of the heterogeneous nature of the disease, prognosis in IPEX is highly dependent on the specific FOXP3 mutation as well as other individual genotypic and environmental factors. The 10- and 30-year survival rates of individuals with confirmed FOXP3 mutations was found to be 65% and 52%, respectively. Individuals who receive hematopoietic stem cell transplant (HSCT) have higher survival rates than those who receive no treatment or immunosuppression only.

== Research ==
In 1982, Powell et al. published a case report of a family with 19 males who were affected by an X-linked syndrome with symptoms including polyendocrinopathy and diarrhea. The most common symptoms in this family were severe enteropathy, T1D, and dermatitis. Only 2 of the 19 affected males in the family survived past 3 years old. These individuals lived to 10 and 30 years old. Powell's study is now widely considered the first documentation of IPEX.

=== Scurfy mouse ===
Scurfy is a type of model mouse used for immunology research. Scurfy mice have had 2 base pairs inserted within the FOXP3 gene. This leads to a frameshift mutation in FOXP3 gene and the expressed protein is truncated, causing functional deficiency of Treg cells. Then, autoreactive CD4^{+}T cells and inflammatory cells cause tissue damage. Scurfy mice have an enlarged spleen and lymph nodes, squinted red eyes, and scaly or "ruffled" skin. The mice also have immunity problems and tend to die approximately 3 weeks after birth. From 2000 - 2001, multiple studies confirmed that IPEX is the human equivalent of scurfy mice and that the FOXP3 gene is responsible.

== See also ==
- Autoimmune polyendocrine syndrome
- FOXP3
- Autoimmune polyendocrine syndrome type 2
