= Autoimmune polyendocrine syndrome type 2 =

- Other names: Schmidt's syndrome
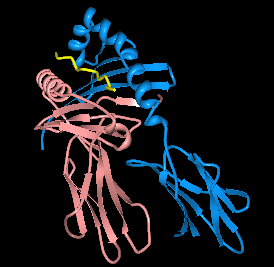
- HLA-DQ2 one of the human leukocyte antigens genotypes responsible for this condition
- Specialty: Endocrinology
- Symptoms: Asplenia
- Risk factors: Human leukocyte antigen (HLA-DQ2, HLA-DQ8 and HLA-DR4)
- Diagnostic method: Ultrasound, MRI
- Treatment: Thyroid-stimulating hormone

Autoimmune polyendocrine syndrome type 2, a form of autoimmune polyendocrine syndrome also known as APS-II, or PAS II, is the most common form of the polyglandular failure syndromes. PAS II is defined as the association between autoimmune Addison's disease and either autoimmune thyroid disease, type 1 diabetes, or both. It is heterogeneous and has not been linked to one gene. Rather, individuals are at a higher risk when they carry a particular human leukocyte antigen (HLA-DQ2, HLA-DQ8 and HLA-DR4). APS-II affects women to a greater degree than men.

== Signs and symptoms ==
Signs and symptoms that are consistent in an individual affected with autoimmune polyendocrine syndrome type 2 are the following:

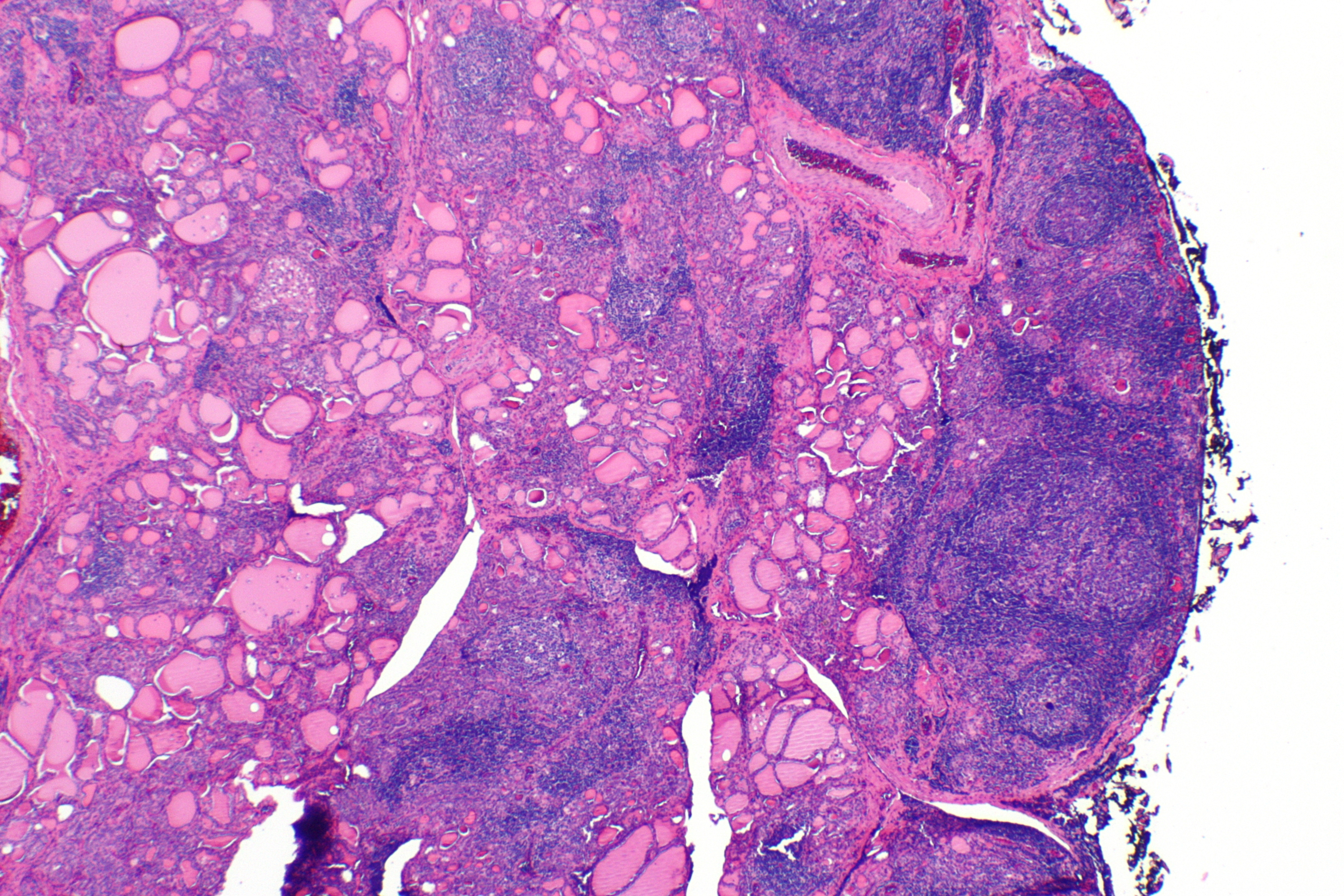
Hashimoto thyroiditis

- Nausea
- Frequent urination
- Palpitations
- Weight loss
- Anorexia
- Low blood pressure
- Hypoparathyroidism
- Myalgias
- Hashimoto thyroiditis
- Graves' disease
- Anaemia
- Hypogonadism
- Diabetes mellitus

== Genetics ==
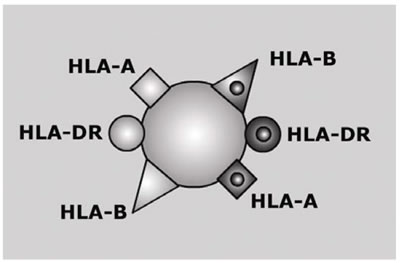
HLA(haplotypes)

In terms of genetics one finds that autoimmune polyendocrine syndrome type 2 has an autosomal dominant pattern of inheritance, with an incomplete penetrance. Furthermore, the human leukocyte antigen involved in this condition are HLA-DQ2(DR3 (DQB*0201)) and HLA-DQ8(DR4 (DQB1*0302)), genetically speaking, which indicates this is a multifactorial disorder, as well.

Should any affected organs show chronic inflammatory infiltrate (lymphocytes), this would be an indication. Moreover, autoantibodies reacting to specific antigens is common, in the immune system of an affected individual.

== Diagnosis ==
In terms of genetic testing, while it is done for type 1 of this condition, type 2 will only render (or identify) those genes which place the individual at higher risk. Other methods/exam to ascertain if an individual has autoimmune polyendocrine syndrome type 2 are:

- CT scan
- MRI
- Ultrasound

== Treatment ==
Type of glucocorticoid

Management of autoimmune polyendocrine syndrome type 2 consists of the following:

- Cyclosporin A
- Isohormonal therapy
- Glucocorticoids
- Thyroid hormone replacement
- Dietary guidelines(depending if diabetic/Addison d.)

== History ==
The condition was recognized by Martin Benno Schmidt (1863 – 1949), a German pathologist, first described in 1926. A third subtype, PAS III, has been described in adults, but apart from the absence of adrenal failure, no clinical differences between types II and III have been described. Because of this, both of these subtypes are generally referred to as PAS II.

== Society and culture ==
- U.S. President John F. Kennedy is presumed to have suffered from Autoimmune Polyendocrine Syndrome, Type II.

== See also ==
- IPEX syndrome
- Autoimmune polyendocrine syndrome
