= Congenital athymia =

Rare immune disorder where the thymus is missing at birth

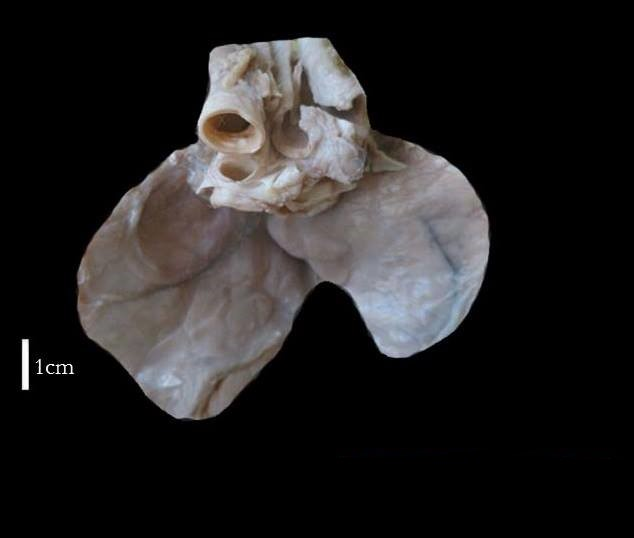
- Human thymus, posterior view.
- Specialty: Immunology, Medical genetics

Congenital athymia is an extremely rare disorder marked by the absence of the thymus at birth. T cell maturation and selection depend on the thymus, and newborns born without a thymus experience severe immunodeficiency. A significant T cell deficiency, recurrent infections, susceptibility to opportunistic infections, and a tendency to develop autologous graft-versus-host disease (GVHD) or, in the case of complete DiGeorge syndrome, an "atypical" phenotype are characteristics of congenital athymia.

== Signs and symptoms ==
Congenital athymia's clinical symptoms are directly related to the thymus's absence and its incapacity to generate T cells with the necessary immune capabilities. An increased vulnerability to bacterial, viral, and fungal infections results from T-cell immunodeficiency.

These patients have an especially high incidence of pneumonias. M. bovis and the respiratory syncytial virus have been linked to additional cases of severe pulmonary infections. This group is also prone to gastrointestinal infections, such as those caused by the rotavirus, norovirus, enterovirus, M. bovis, and C. difficile viruses. Diarrhea, malabsorption, and failure to thrive can result from these infections. Although gastrointestinal and lung infections are the most frequently reported infection types, congenital athymia patients can present with a wide range of other infection types. There have been reports of infections of the head, ears, nose, and throat, including meningitis, sinusitis, mastoiditis, and thrush, as well as infections of the urinary tract caused by K. pnuemoniae, E. faecium, and echovirus.

T cells may expand extrathymic oligoclonally in congenital athymia. These cells can infiltrate organs and result in autologous graft-versus-host disease, but they confer little to no protective immunity. Individuals who have an expansion of oligoclonal T cells usually have an eczematous rash and accompanying lymphadenopathy. T cell infiltration can result in enteropathy and transaminitis in the gastrointestinal tract.

Congenital athymia patients also have other autoimmune-mediated manifestations, such as autoimmune thyroiditis, hypothyroidism, and Coombs-positive hemolytic anemia.

== Causes ==
Congenital athymia is linked to a number of genetic disorders, congenital syndromes, and environmental variables. Genetic abnormalities that are either (1) specific to thymic development or (2) related to the development of the midline region as a whole can cause congenital athymia.

=== Risk factors ===
Congenital athymia is linked to multiple environmental etiologies. Affected fetal thymus size and other congenital anomalies like renal agenesis and butterfly vertebrae are linked to diabetic embryopathy. It has been shown that babies of diabetic mothers have thymic aplasia. Retinoic acid exposure during fetal development is also linked to phenotypes associated with DiGeorge syndrome, such as hypoplasia and thymic developmental abnormalities such as aplasia and ectopia.

=== Genetics ===
The most well-known gene associated with thymic development is Forkhead Box N1 (FOXN1). As a member of the transcription factor family known as the forkhead box gene family, FOXN1 plays a role in the growth and differentiation of skin epithelial cells as well as the development, differentiation, and maintenance of thymic epithelial cells during embryonic and postnatal life.

The transcription factors known as the paired box family, which control tissue differentiation, includes Paired Box 1 (PAX1). Numerous studies have reported on patients with autosomal recessive otofaciocervical syndrome type 2 (OTFCS2) and mutations in PAX1. Because of altered thymus development, OTFCS2 is associated with a syndromic form of SCID.

The two most common genetic syndromes linked to thymus development defects are 22q11.2 deletion syndrome and CHARGE syndrome. Patients with these syndromes exhibit a variety of symptoms because the genes TBX1 and CHD7, associated with these disorders, play a role in the development of the entire midline region. Additional genes that may be involved in healthy thymus development are FOXI3 and TBX2.

== Treatment ==
In October 2021, the thymus tissue product Rethymic was approved by U.S. Food and Drug Administration (FDA) as a medical therapy for the treatment of children with congenital athymia. It takes six months or longer to reconstitute the immune function in treated children.

== See also ==
- DiGeorge syndrome
- Thymectomy
