= Thymic cancer =

Thymic cancer is a general term for a cancer of the thymus gland.

- Thymic carcinoma
- Thymoma
