= Allogeneic processed thymus tissue =

Thymus tissue medical therapy

Clinical data
- Trade names: Rethymic
- Other names: RVT-802, allogeneic processed thymus tissue-agdc
- License data: US DailyMed: Allogeneic processed thymus tissue
- Routes of administration: Surgical implantation
- ATC code: None

Legal status
- Legal status: US: ℞-only

Allogeneic processed thymus tissue, sold under the brand name Rethymic, is a thymus tissue therapy used for the treatment of children with congenital athymia. It is administered via a one-time surgical procedure where the tissue slices are implanted into the quadriceps muscle. It takes six months or longer to reconstitute the immune function in treated people.

The most common adverse reactions include high blood pressure, cytokine release syndrome, low blood magnesium levels, rash, low platelets, and graft versus host disease.

Allogeneic processed thymus tissue was approved for medical use in the United States in October 2021. Allogeneic processed thymus tissue is the first thymus tissue product approved by the U.S. Food and Drug Administration (FDA).

Allogeneic processed thymus tissue is composed of human allogeneic (donor-derived) thymus tissue that is processed and cultured, and then implanted into people to help reconstitute immunity (improve immune function) in people who are athymic. Dosing is patient customized, determined by the surface area of the allogeneic processed thymus tissue slices and the body surface area of the patient.

== Medical uses ==
Allogeneic processed thymus tissue is indicated for immune reconstitution in children with congenital athymia.

== History ==
The safety and efficacy of allogeneic processed thymus tissue were established in clinical studies that included 105 participants, with ages from one month to 16 years, who each received a single administration of allogeneic processed thymus tissue, from 1993 to 2020. Allogeneic processed thymus tissue improved survival of people with congenital athymia, and most people treated with this product survived at least two years.

== Society and culture ==
=== Legal status ===
Allogeneic processed thymus tissue was approved for medical use in the United States in October 2021. The US Food and Drug Administration granted the application for allogeneic processed thymus tissue a rare pediatric disease voucher and granted approval of Rethymic to Enzyvant Therapeutics.

=== Names ===
Allogeneic processed thymus tissue is sold under the brand name Rethymic.
