= Turtle shell =

Shield for the ventral and dorsal parts of turtles

A preserved turtle skeleton showing how the carapace and plastron connect with the rest of the skeleton to form a shell enclosing the body

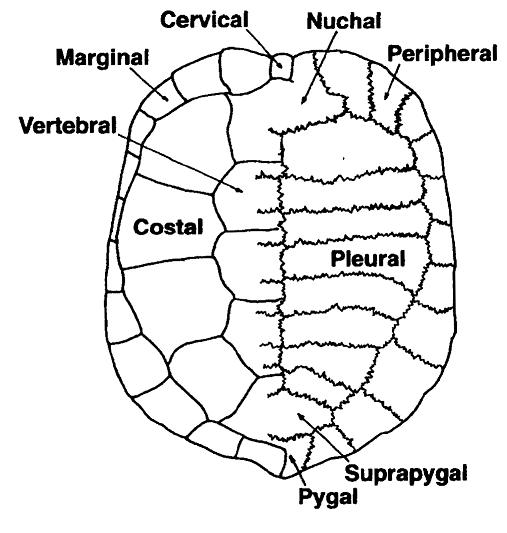
Carapace: Scutes (left) and skeletal components (right).

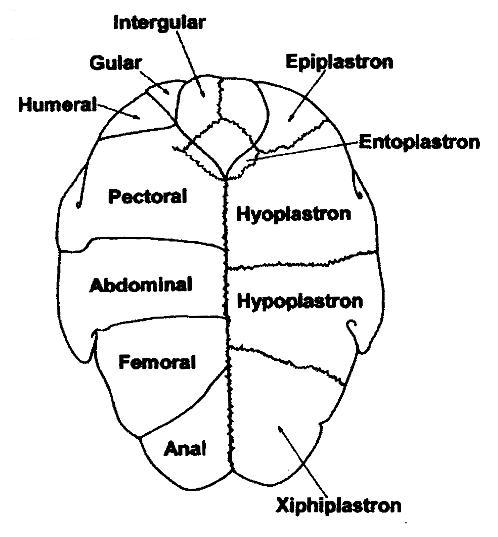
Plastron: Scutes (left) and skeletal components (right). Pleurodires have an extra scute known as the intergular. It is mostly absent in cryptodires.

The turtle shell is a shield for turtles (order Testudines), completely enclosing all the turtle's vital organs and in some cases even the head. It comprises an upper part, the carapace, and lower part, the plastron, connected by a bony bridge. It is constructed of modified bony elements such as the ribs, parts of the pelvis, and other bones found in most reptiles. The bone of the shell consists of both skeletal and dermal bone, showing that the complete enclosure of the shell likely evolved by including dermal armor into the rib cage.

The turtle's shell is important to study, not just because of the apparent protection it provides for the animal, but also as an identification tool, in particular with fossils, as the shell is one of the most likely parts of a turtle to survive fossilization. Therefore, understanding the shell structure in living species provides comparable material with fossils.

The shell of the hawksbill turtle, among other species, has been used as a material for a wide range of small decorative and practical items since antiquity, including food and medicine, but is normally referred to as tortoiseshell.

== Shell nomenclature ==
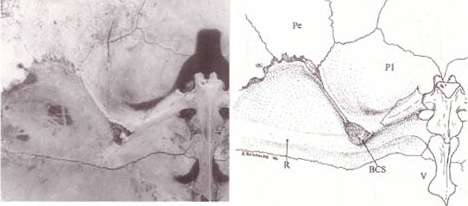
Internal anterior carapace of Elseya dentata. (Annotations: Pe = peripheral, P1 = pleural 1, BCS = bridge carapace suture.)

The turtle shell is made up of numerous bony elements, generally named after similar bones in other vertebrates, and a series of keratinous scutes which are also uniquely named. The ventral surface is called the plastron. These are joined by an area called the bridge. The actual suture between the bridge and the plastron is called the anterior bridge strut. In pleurodires, the posterior pelvis is also part of the carapace, fully fused with it. This is not the case in Cryptodires, which have a floating pelvis. The anterior bridge strut and posterior bridge strut are part of the plastron. On the carapace are the sutures into which they insert, known as the bridge carapace suture.

In the shell, there is a turtle's epidermis layer. This layer is important to the strength of the shell surrounding it. In an international study, the layer can be as thick as two to four cells. Even with such a small thickness, the epidermis allows for the deformation the shell can experience and provides the shell more support. The epidermis layer is apparent in both sections of the shell—carapace and plastron—and is thicker in critical areas. A thicker epidermis allows a higher stress force to be experienced without permanent deformation or critical failure of the shell.

The shape of the shell is from its evolutionary process, which caused many microstructures to appear to aid survival and motion. The shell shape allows the animal to escape predatory situations. Microstructures can include the scutes mentioned prior or the ribs found internally of the shell. Many ribs can be found within and throughout the shell. The rib structures provide extra structural support but allows the shell to deform elastically depending on the situation the turtle is in (i.e., predatory escape). Nonstructural mechanisms have also been in the turtle shell that aids the turtle during locomotion. A mucus film covers parts of the shell, allowing some physical protection and also reducing friction and drag.

The bones of the shell are named for standard vertebrate elements. As such, the carapace is made up of eight pleurals on each side. These are a combination of the ribs and fused dermal bone. Outside of this, at the anterior of the shell, is the single nuchal bone, a series of twelve paired periphals then extend along each side. At the posterior of the shell is the pygal bone, and in front of this, nested behind the eighth pleurals, is the suprapygal.

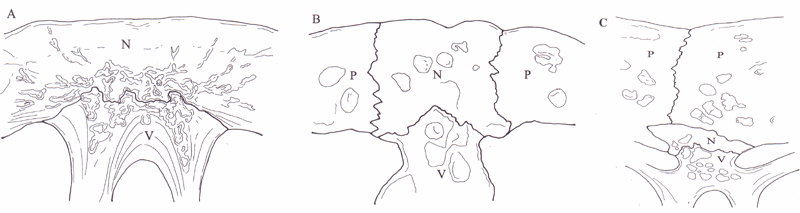
Transverse sections through the first neural of A. Aspideretes hurum showing the suture between the wide neural bone (N) and the vertebral neural arch (V). B. Chelodina longicollis at pleural IV showing a narrow midline neural bone, lateral pleurals (P) and underlying vertebral neural arch. and C. Emydura subglobosa at pleural IV showing location of a rudimentary neural bone underneath medially contiguous pleurals.

Between each of the pleurals are a series of neural bones, which although always present are not always visible, in many species of Pleurodire they are submerged below the pleurals. Beneath the neural bone is the neural arch which forms the upper half of the encasement for the spinal cord. Below this the rest of the vertebral column. Some species of turtles have some extra bones called mesoplastra, which are located between the carapace and plastron in the bridge area. They are present in most Pelomedusid turtles.

The skeletal elements of the plastron are also largely in pairs. Anteriorly there are two epiplastra, with the hyoplastra behind them. These enclose the singular entoplastron. These make up the front half of the plastron and the hyoplastron contains the anterior bridge strut. The posterior half is made up of two hypoplastra (containing the posterior bridge strut) and the rear is a pair of xiphiplastra.

Overlying the boney elements are a series of scutes, which are made of keratin and are very similar to horn or nail tissue. In the center of the carapace are five vertebral scutes, and out from these are four pairs of costal scutes. Around the edge of the shell are 12 pairs of marginal scutes. All these scutes are aligned so that for the most part the sutures between the bones are in the middle of the scutes above. At the anterior of the shell there may be a cervical scute (sometimes incorrectly called a nuchal scute); however, the presence or absence of this scute is highly variable, even within species.

On the plastron there are two gular scutes at the front, followed by a pair of pectorals, then abdominals, femorals, and lastly anals. A particular variation is that the Pleurodiran turtles have an intergular scute between the gulars at the front, giving them a total of 13 plastral scutes, compared to the 12 in all Cryptodiran turtles.

== Carapace ==
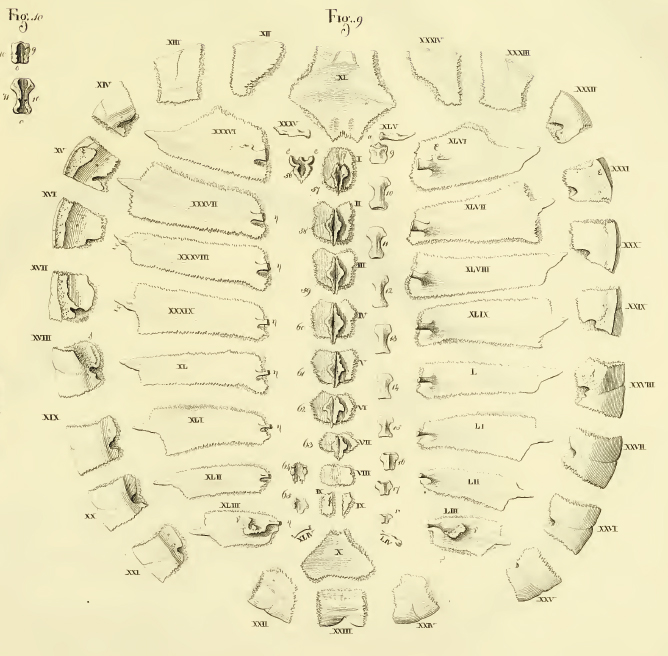
Exploded view of the carapace of Emys orbicularis. Legend (i) Neural 1, (ii) Neural 2, (iii) Neural 3, (iv) Neural 4, (v) Neural 5, (vi) Neural 6, (vii) Neural 7, (viii) Neural 8, (ix) extra neural, divided, (x) suprapygal, (xi) nuchal, (xii) right peripheral 1, (xiii) right peripheral 2, (xiv) right peripheral 3, (xv) right peripheral 4, (xvi) right peripheral 5, (xvii) right peripheral 6, (xviii) right peripheral 7, (xix) right peripheral 8, (xx) right peripheral 9, (xxi) right peripheral 10, (xxii) right peripheral 11, (xxiii) pygal, (xxiv) left peripheral 11, (xxv) left peripheral 10, (xxvi) left peripheral 9, (xxvii) left peripheral 8, (xxviii) left peripheral 7, (xxix) left peripheral 6, xxx left peripheral 5, xxxi left peripheral 4, (xxxii) left peripheral 3, (xxxiii) left peripheral 2, (xxxiv) left peripheral 1, (xxxv) right 1st rib, (xxxvi) right pleural 1, (xxxvii) right pleural 2, (xxxviii) right pleural 3, (xxxix) right pleural 4, (xl) right pleural 5, (xli) right pleural 6, (xlii) right pleural 7, (xliii) right pleural 8, (xliv) right 10th rib, (xlv) left 1st rib, (xlvi) left pleural 1, (xlvii) left pleural 2, (xlviii) left pleural 3, (xlix) left pleural 4, (l) left pleural 5, (li) left pleural 6, (lii) left pleural 7, (liii) left pleural 8, (liv) left 10th rib, (9-18) centrums.

The carapace is the dorsal (back), convex part of the shell structure of a turtle, consisting of the animal's ossified ribs fused with the dermal bone. The spine and expanded ribs are fused through ossification to dermal plates beneath the skin to form a hard shell. Exterior to the skin, the shell is covered by scutes, which are horny plates made of keratin that protect the shell from scrapes and bruises. A keel, a ridge that runs from front to the back of the animal, is present in some species. These may be single, paired, or even three rows. In most turtles, the shell is relatively uniform in structure, species variation in general shape and color being the main differences. However, the soft shell turtles, pig-nose turtles, and the leatherback sea turtle have lost the scutes and reduced the ossification of the shell. This leaves the shell covered only by skin. These are all highly aquatic forms.

The evolution of the turtle's shell is unique because of how the carapace represents transformed vertebrae and ribs. While other tetrapods have their scapula, or shoulder blades, found outside of the ribcage, the scapula for turtles is found inside the ribcage. The shells of other tetrapods, such as armadillos, are not linked directly to the vertebral column or rib cage, allowing the ribs to move freely with the surrounding intercostal muscle. However, analysis of the transitional fossil Eunotosaurus africanus shows that early ancestors of turtles lost that intercostal muscle usually found between the ribs.

== Plastron ==
Comparison of plastrons of a Cryptodire (Chrysemys picta marginata) and a Pleurodire (Chelodina canni)

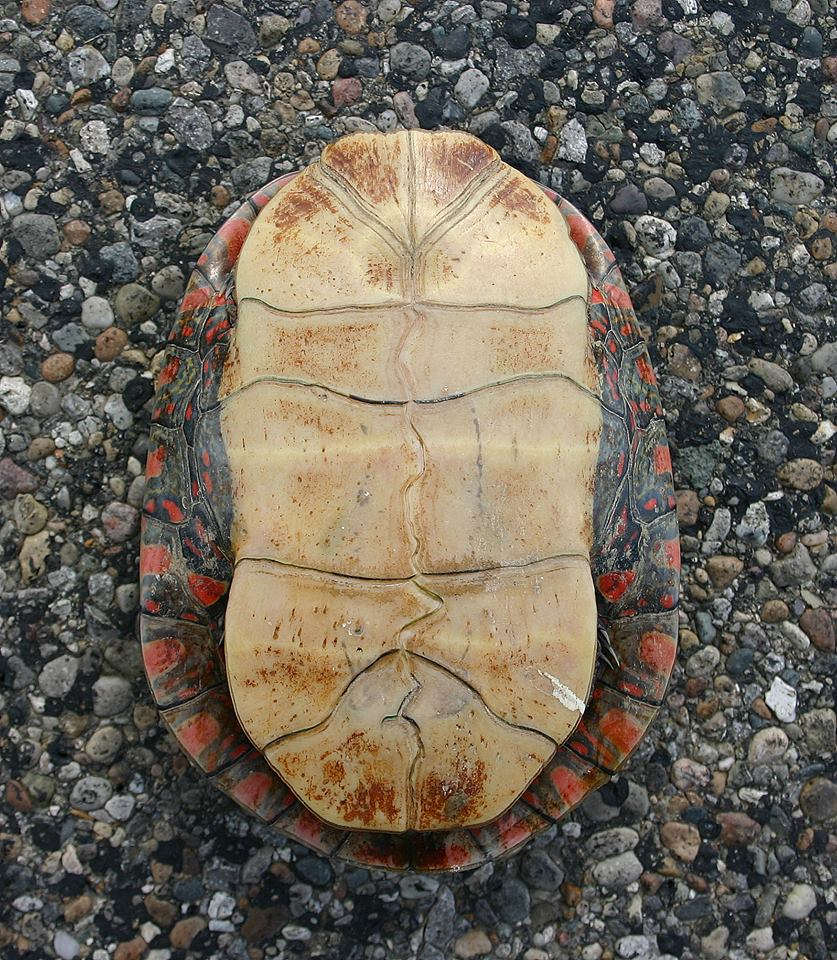
Plastral view of Chrysemys picta marginata

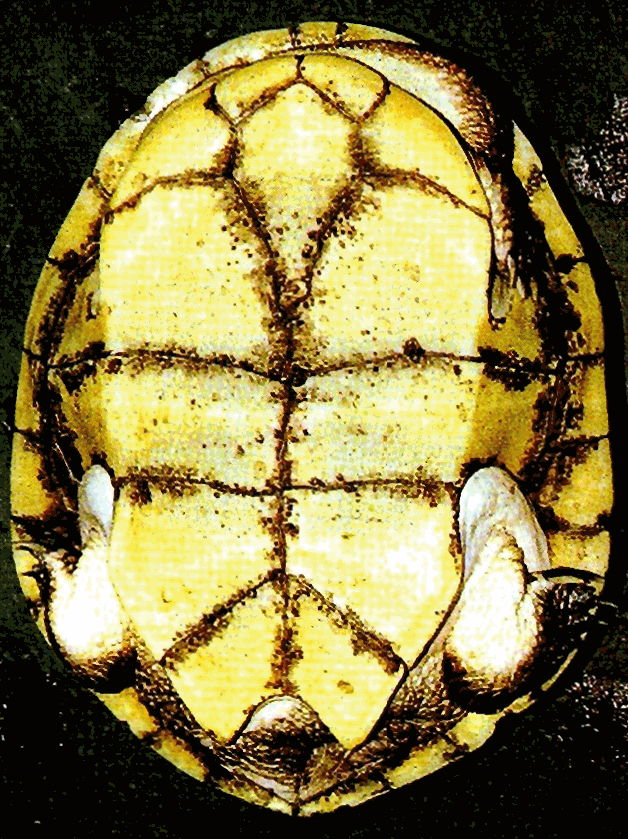
Plastral view Chelodina canni

The plastron (plural: plastrons or plastra) is the nearly flat part of the shell structure of a turtle, what one would call the belly or ventral surface of the shell. It also includes within its structure the anterior and posterior bridge struts and the bridge of the shell. The plastron is made up of nine bones, and the two epiplastra at the anterior border of the plastron are homologous to the clavicles of other tetrapods. The rest of the plastral bones are homologous to the gastralia of other tetrapods. The plastron has been described as an exoskeleton, like osteoderms of other reptilians; but unlike osteoderms, the plastron also possesses osteoblasts, the osteoid, and the periosteum.

The evolution of the plastron has remained more mysterious, though Georges Cuvier, a French naturalist and zoologist in the 19th century, wrote that the plastron developed primarily from the sternum of the turtle. This fits well with the knowledge obtained through embryological studies, showing that changes in the pathways of rib development often result in malformation or loss of the plastron. This phenomenon occurs in turtle development, but instead of experiencing complete loss of the sternum, the turtle body plan repurposes the bone into the form of the plastron. However, other analyses find that the endochondral sternum is absent and replaced by the exoskeletal plastron. The ventral ribs are effectively not present, replaced by the plastron, unless the gastralia from which the plastron evolved were once floating ventral ribs. During turtle evolution, there was probably a division of labor between the ribs, which specialized to stabilize the trunk, and the abdominal muscles, which specialized for respiration; these changes took place 50 million years before the shell was fully ossified.

The discovery of an ancestral turtle fossil, Pappochelys rosinae, provides additional clues as to how the plastron formed. Pappochelys serves as an intermediate form between two early stem-turtles, E. africanus and Odontochelys, the latter of which possesses a fully formed plastron. In place of a modern plastron, Pappochelys has paired gastralia, like those found in E. africanus. Pappochelys is different from its ancestor because the gastralia show signs of having once been fused, as indicated by the fossil specimens which show forked ends. This evidence shows a gradual change from paired gastralia, to paired and fused gastralia, and finally to the modern plastron across these three specimens.

In certain families there is a hinge between the pectoral and abdominal scutes allowing the turtle to almost completely enclose itself. In certain species the sex of a testudine can be told by whether the plastron is concave (male) or convex (female). This is because of the mating position; the male's concave plastron allows it to more easily mount the female during copulation.

The plastral scutes join along a central seam down the middle of the plastron. The relative lengths of the seam segments can be used to help identify a species of turtle. There are six laterally symmetric pairs of scutes on the plastron: gular, humeral, pectoral, abdominal, femoral, and anal (going from the head to the tail down the seam); the abdominal and gular scute seams are approximately the same length, and the femoral and pectoral seams are approximately the same length.

The gular scute or gular projection on a turtle is the most anterior part of the plastron, the underside of the shell. Some tortoises have paired gular scutes, while others have a single undivided gular scute. The gular scutes may be referred to as a gular projection if they stick out like a trowel.

=== Plastral formula ===
The plastral formula is used to compare the sizes of the individual plastral scutes (measured along the midseam). The following plastral scutes are often distinguished (with their abbreviation):

intergular	= intergul
gular	= gul
humeral	= hum
pectoral	= pect
abdominal	= abd
femoral	= fem
anal	= an

Comparison of the plastral formulas provides distinction between the two species. For example, for the eastern box turtle, the plastral formula is: an > abd > gul > pect > hum >< fem.

Turtle plastrons were used by the ancient Chinese in a type of divination called plastromancy.

== Scutes ==
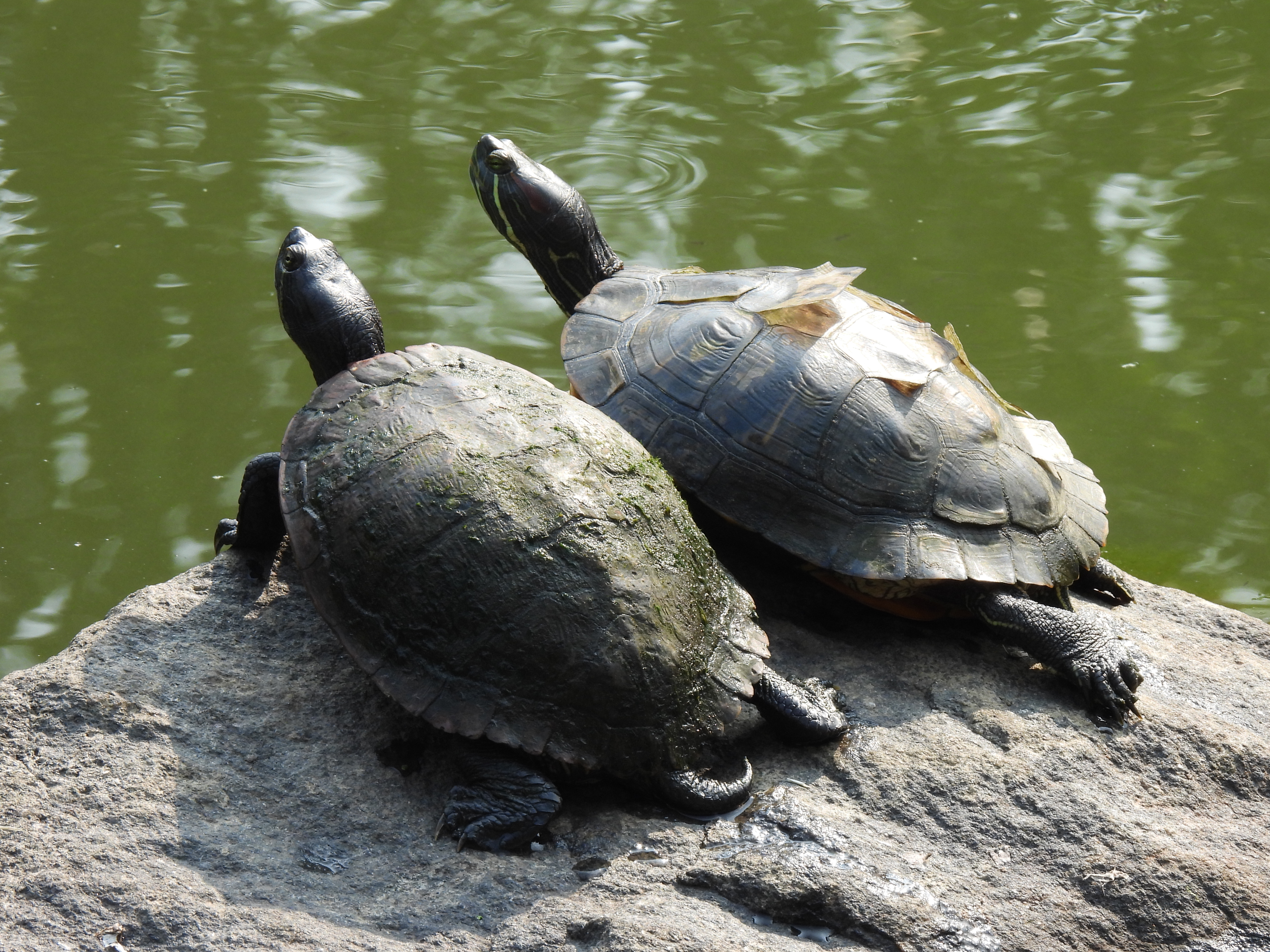
Pair of pond slider turtles with one on the left having a normal shell (somewhat muddy) and the other on the right exhibiting scute shedding of shell segments.

The turtle's shell is covered in scutes that are made of keratin. The individual scutes (as shown above) have specific names and are generally consistent across the various species of turtles. Terrestrial tortoises do not shed their scutes. New scutes grow by the addition of keratin layers to the base of each scute. Aquatic chelonii shed individual scutes. The scute effectively forms the skin over the underlying bony structures; there is a very thin layer of subcutaneous tissue between the scute and the skeleton. The scutes can be brightly colored in some species, and turtle shells often follow Thayer's law with carapace usually being a darker patterning than the plastron, though there are exceptions. Moustakas-Verho and Cherepanov's embryological study reveals that the patterning of the plastral scutes appear independent from the patterning of carapacial scutes, suggesting that the carapace and plastron evolved separately.

The appearance of scutes correlates to the transition from aquatic to terrestrial mode of life in tetrapods during the Carboniferous period (340 Ma). In the evolution from amphibians to terrestrial amniotes, transition in a wide variety of skin structures occurred. Ancestors of turtles likely diverged from amphibians to develop a horny cover in their early terrestrial ancestral forms.

Names of epidermal scutes in turtle shells
Boulenger 1889	Carr 1952	Zangerl 1969	Pritchard 1979
nuchal	precentral	cervical	nuchal
vertebral	central	vertebral	central
costal	lateral	pleural	costal
marginal	marginal	marginal	marginal
supracaudal	postcentral	12th marginal	supracaudal
intergular	-	intergular	intergular
(extra-) gular	gular	gular	gular
humeral	humeral	humeral	humeral
pectoral	pectoral	pectoral	pectoral
abdominal	abdominal	abdominal	abdominal
femoral	femoral	femoral	femoral
anal	anal	anal	anal

== Ontogeny ==
Development of the shell: seen in the egg at stage 16/17, the carapace is developing. In section, the ribs are growing sideways not downwards, into the carapacial ridge, seen here as a bud, to support the carapace.

The carapacial ridge plays an essential role in the development of the turtle shell. Embryological analyses show that the carapacial ridge initiates the formation of the turtle shell. It causes axial arrest which causes the ribs to be dorsalized, the shoulder girdle to be rearranged and encapsulated in the rib cage, and the carapace to develop. Odontochelys semitestacea presents evidence of axial arrest that is observed in embryos but lacks fan-shaped ribs and a carapace. This suggests that the primitive carapacial ridge functioned differently and must have gained the function of mediating the ribs and carapace development later. The PAX1 and Sonic hedgehog gene (SHH) serve as key regulators during the development of the vertebral column. SHH expression in the neural tube is essential for the maintenance of PAX1 expression in the ventral sclerotome and thus plays a key role in carapacial rib development. Genetic observations of PAX1 and SHH further provide an understanding in key gene expression that could potentially be responsible for changing turtle morphology.

During the development of the turtle embryo, the ribs grow sideways into the carapacial ridge, unique to turtles, entering the dermis of the back to support the carapace. The development is signalled locally by fibroblast growth factors including FGF10.

== Evolutionary origin ==
=== Bony dermal plates theory: the "Polka Dot Ancestor" ===
Zoologists have sought to explain the evolutionary origin of the turtles, and in particular of their unique carapace. In 1914, J. Versluys proposed that bony plates in the dermis, osteoderms, fused first to each other and then to the ribs beneath them. The theory persisted into the 21st century, when Olivier Rieppel proposed a hypothetical turtle precursor, its back covered by bony armour plates in the dermis, which he called the "Polka Dot Ancestor". Michael Lee proposed that the transformation of the carapace began with an unarmoured parareptile and then an armoured pareiasaur, and ended with modern turtles with a fully developed carapace and a relocated rib cage. The theory accounted for the evolution of fossil pareisaurs from Bradysaurus to Anthodon, but not for how the ribs could have become attached to the bony dermal plates.

=== Broadened ribs theory ===
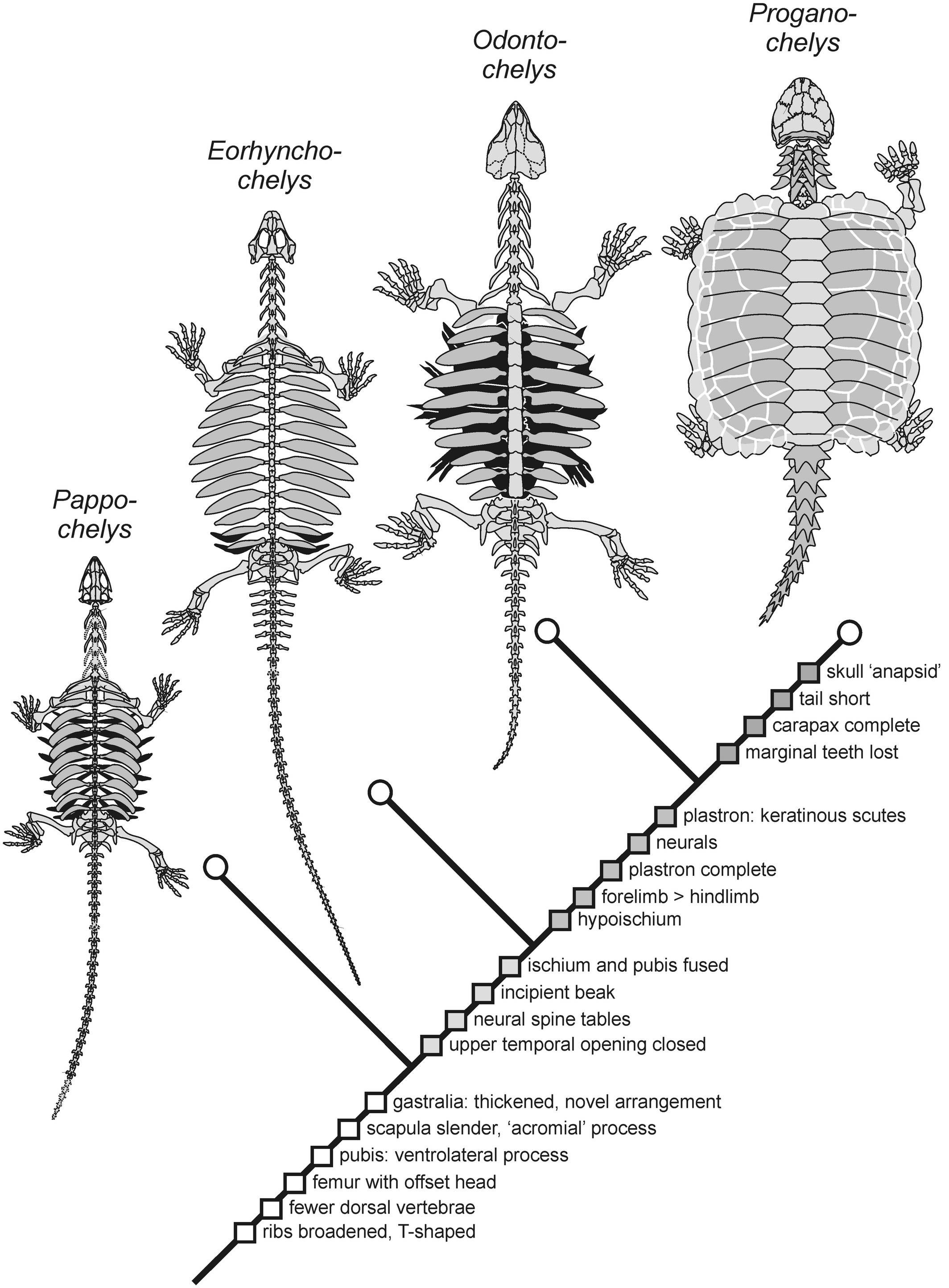
Diagram of origins of turtle body plan through the Triassic: isolated bony plates evolved to form a complete shell.

==== Permian: first stem-turtles ====
Recent stem-turtle fossil discoveries provide a "comprehensive scenario" of the evolution of the turtle's shell. A fossil that may be a stem-turtle from the Permian of South Africa, Eunotosaurus, some 260 million years ago, had a short broad trunk, and a body-case of broadened and somewhat overlapping ribs, suggesting an early stage in the acquisition of a shell. The fossil has been called "a diapsid reptile in the process of becoming secondarily anapsid". Olivier Rieppel summarizes the phylogenetic origins of the ancestral turtles: "Eunotosaurus is placed at the bottom of the stem section of the turtle tree, followed by Pappochelys and Odontochelys along the turtle stem and on to more crown-ward turtles".

Tyler Lyson and colleagues suggest that Eunotosaurus might imply a fossorial origin for the turtles. During the Permian, the broadened ribs may have provided great stability in burrowing, giving a body shape resembling the extant fossorial gopher tortoise, with strong shoulders and forelimbs, and increased muscle attachment structures such as their tubercle on the posterior coracoid and their large and wide terminal phalanges creating shovel-like "hands". Fossoriality may have helped Eunotosaurus survive the global mass extinction at the end of the Permian period, and could have played an essential role in the early evolution of shelled turtles.

==== Triassic: evolution of complete shell ====
A stem-turtle from the Middle Triassic of Germany, some 240 million years ago, Pappochelys, has more distinctly broadened ribs, T-shaped in cross-section. They vary in shape along the spine.

A Late Triassic stem-turtle from Guizhou, China, Eorhynchochelys, is a much larger animal, up to 1.8 metres (5.9 ft) long, with a long tail and broadened but not overlapping ribs. Like the earlier fossils, it has small teeth.

Also in the Late Triassic, some 220 million years ago, the freshwater Odontochelys semitestacea of Guangling in southwest China has a partial shell, consisting of a complete bony plastron and an incomplete carapace. The fossil showed that the plastron evolved before the carapace. Like crown turtles, it lacked intercostal muscles, so rib mobility was limited. The ribs were laterally expanded and broadened without ossification, like the embryos of modern turtles.

The development of a shell reaches completion with the late Triassic Proganochelys of Germany and Thailand. It lacked the ability to pull its head into its shell, and had a long neck and a long, spiked tail ending in a club, somewhat like an ankylosaur.

== Diseases ==
=== Shell rot ===
Septicemic cutaneous ulcerative disease (SCUD) or "shell rot" causes ulceration of the shell. This is caused by bacteria or fungi entering through an abrasion, and poor animal husbandry. The disease progresses to a septicemic infection causing the degradation of the liver and other organs.

=== Pyramiding ===
Pyramiding is a shell deformity of captive tortoises in which the shell grows unevenly, resulting in a pyramid shape underlying each scute. Factors which may contribute to pyramiding include inadequate water supply; the consumption of excessive animal or vegetable protein; inadequate calcium, UVB, and/or vitamin D3; and poor nutrition. Tortoise breeder Richard Fife documents that his wife raised two groups of red-foot tortoise hatchlings, with identical diets over a number of months, but with different environmental moisture. The group raised in low humidity showed pyramiding, whereas the group raised in high humidity did not and had shells identical to wild tortoises. They found the same results with several other species. Researchers C.S. Wiesner and C. Iben also found that dry conditions during the first five months of growth in African spurred tortoises produced taller humps than humid conditions, although dietary protein also had a minor effect.

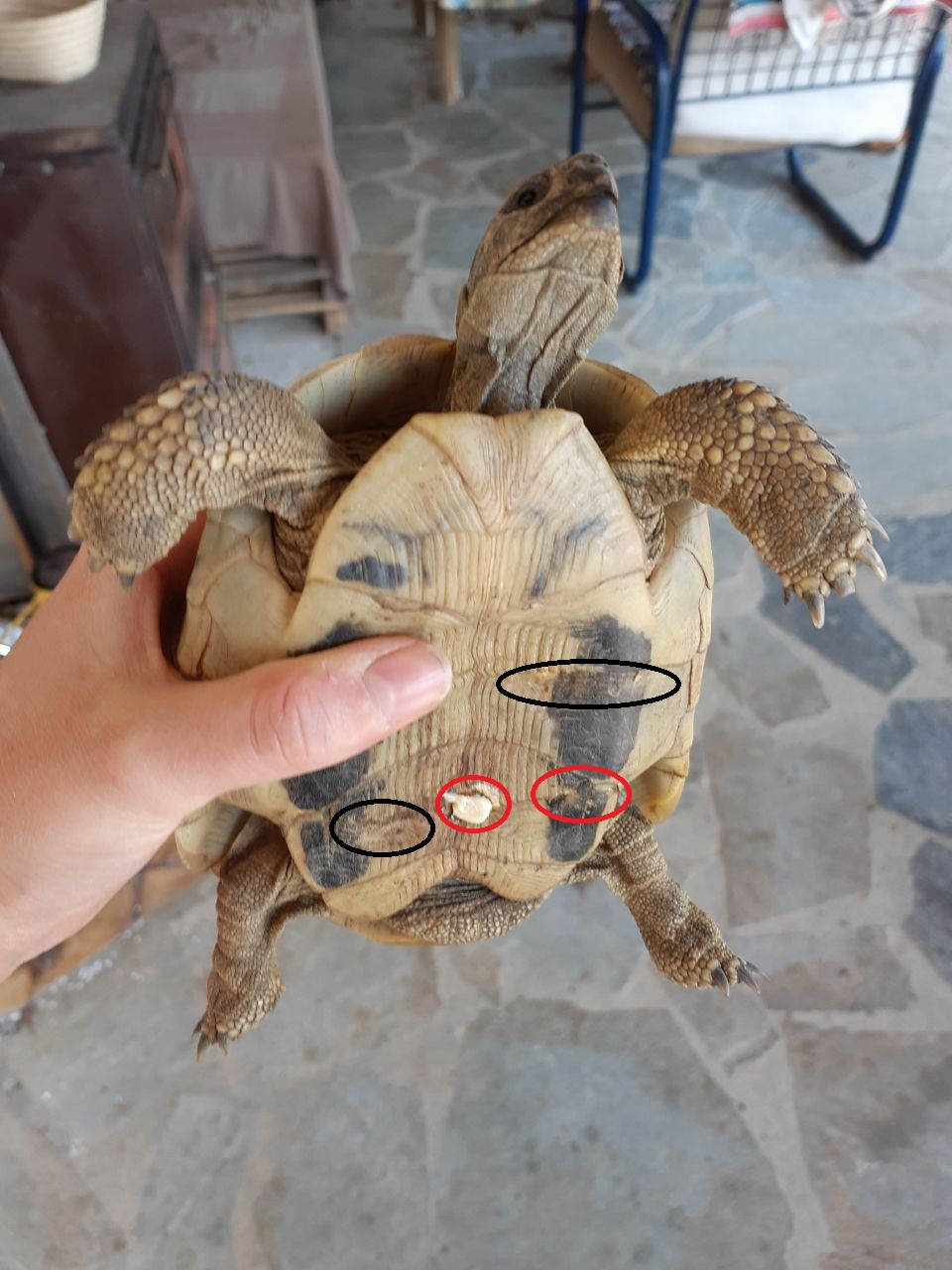
Plastron of wild male Hermann's tortoise with ongoing shell rot (circled in red) and scars from previous shell rot (circled in black)

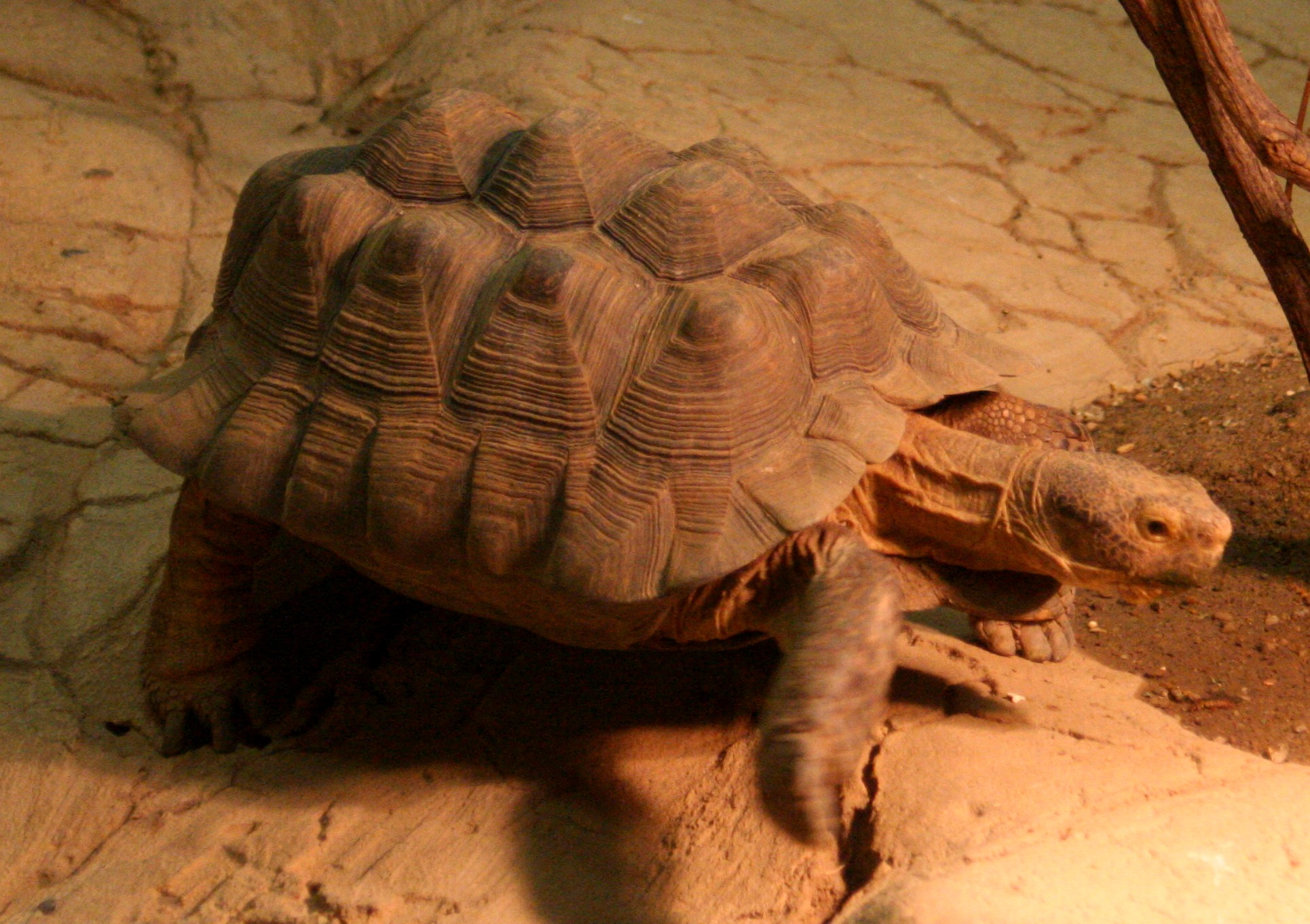
A gopher tortoise with severe pyramiding

== See also ==
- Evolutionary developmental biology
- Oracle bone
