= Thymectomy =

Surgical removal of the thymus

- ICD-9-CM: 07.8
- MeSH: D013934

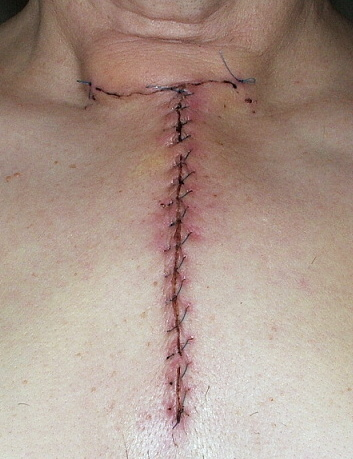

A thymectomy is an operation to remove the thymus. It usually results in remission of myasthenia gravis with the help of medication including steroids. However, this remission may not be permanent. Thymectomy is indicated when thymoma are present in the thymus. Anecdotal evidence suggests MG patients with no evidence of thymoma may still benefit from thymectomy.

== Surgical approaches ==
There are a number of surgical approaches to the removal of the thymus gland: transternal (through the breast bone), transcervical (through a small neck incision), and transthoracic (through one or both sides of the chest).

- The transternal approach is most common and uses the same length-wise incision through the sternum (breast bone) used for most open-heart surgery. It is espoused by surgeons such as Alfred Jaretzki and is the most commonly performed procedure due to its relative simplicity.
- The transcervical approach is a less invasive procedure that allows for removal of the entire thymus gland through a small neck incision.

There has been no difference in success in symptom improvement between the transsternal approach and the minimally invasive transcervical approach.

Video-assisted approaches, such as thoracoscopic surgery, are increasingly prescribed since the less invasive nature of the procedure strikes a balance with the lack of actual clinical evidence supporting thymectomy in non-thymomal cases.

== Impact of thymic loss ==
Thymectomy is a treatment for myasthenia gravis, a neuromuscular disease. For about 60% of people with myasthenia gravis, thymectomy significantly improves their symptoms of muscle weakness. In about 30% of cases, thymectomy results in permanent remission of myasthenia gravis, negating the need for any additional medication. Improvements in condition as a result of thymectomy are often delayed, typically occurring one or two years after the surgical procedure, though could be as late as five years. In some people, thymectomy does not alleviate any symptoms of myasthenia gravis.

Experiments involving thymectomy in newborn mice showed that it unexpectedly resulted in wasting disease when performed before the mouse was three days old. This is because the thymus is the site where T cells are generated. Removal of the thymus results in autoimmunity, in which the immune cells attack the organism's own healthy cells and tissues.

Those who have had their thymus removed should not receive the yellow fever vaccine.

== See also ==
- List of surgeries by type
