= Otofaciocervical syndrome =

- Other names: Fars Chlupackova syndrome
- Specialty: Medical genetics
- Causes: Genetic mutation
- Risk factors: Depends on the type
- Prevention: None
- Prognosis: Bad, nearing medium
- Frequency: Very rare, a total of 24 cases (from both types combined) have been reported worldwide.
- Deaths: -

Otofaciocervical syndrome, also known as Fara Chlupackova syndrome, are a small group of rare developmental disorders of genetic origin which are characterized by facial dysmorphisms, long neck, preauricular and/or branchial pits, cervical muscle hypoplasia, hearing loss, and mild intellectual disabilities. Additional findings include vertebral anomalies and short stature.

== Types ==
There are two types of OFC:

=== Otofaciocervical syndrome type 1 ===
It is characterized by facial dysmorphisms, low-set cup-shaped ears, preauricular sinus or cyst, hearing loss, branchial and skeletal anomalies, low-set clavicle bones, winged scapulae, sloping shoulders and mild intellectual disabilities. It is caused by autosomal dominant mutations in the EYA1 gene in chromosome 8. Only 11 cases have been reported in medical literature.

=== Otofaciocervical syndrome type 2 ===
It is characterized by the same symptoms in type 1, this disorder is different from type 1 because of its genetic cause and because of its additional features: thymus development alterations with T-cell immunodeficiency and recurrent infections which may turn fatal. It is caused by autosomal recessive mutations in the PAX1 gene in chromosome 20. Only 13 cases have been described in medical literature.
