= Thymoma-associated multiorgan autoimmunity =

Thymoma-associated multiorgan autoimmunity (TAMA)
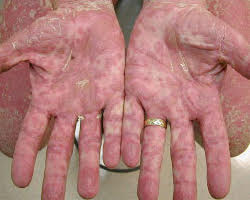

Thymoma-associated multiorgan autoimmunity (TAMA) is a severe often fatal disease that presents in some patients with thymoma. It has also been referred to in the medical literature as "thymoma-associated graft-versus-host-like disease".

== Presentation ==
Patients with TAMA present with variable combinations of a morbilliform skin eruption, chronic diarrhea, and abnormal liver enzymes. The histopathology of the skin, liver, or bowel mucosa resembles GVHD.

== Pathophysiology ==
Thymoma is a relatively uncommon neoplasm arising from the thymus, the primary lymphoid organ where T cells become educated to distinguish "self" from "non self". In the setting of thymoma, abnormal thymic education occurs as a result of subtle differences in antigen processing. In TAMA these differences result in autoreactive T cells escaping from the thymus. This results in a condition similar to graft-versus-host disease.

== Treatment ==
Patients often have a refractory disease course but some patients may respond to phototherapy.

== History ==
This disease name was coined by Emanual Maverakis and described in detail in 2007 but case reports of graft-versus-host-like disease in the setting of thymoma date back to at least the mid 1990s.
