= MEOX1 =

Protein-coding gene in the species Homo sapiens

Identifiers
- Aliases: MEOX1, KFS2, MOX1, mesenchyme homeobox 1
- External IDs: OMIM: 600147; MGI: 103220; GeneCards: MEOX1

Gene location (Human)
Chr.	Chromosome 17 (human)
Band	17q21.31	Start	43,640,389 bp
Band	17q21.31	End	43,661,922 bp

Gene location (Mouse)
Chr.	Chromosome 11 (mouse)
Band	11 D|11 65.48 cM	Start	101,768,336 bp
Band	11 D|11 65.48 cM	End	101,785,200 bp
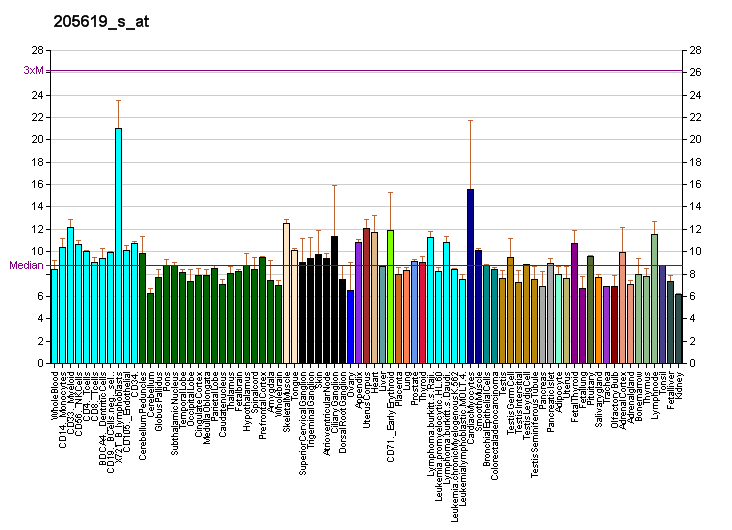
RNA expression pattern
Bgee	Human / Mouse (ortholog); Top expressed in: tendon of biceps brachii; subcutaneous adipose tissue; apex of heart; Achilles tendon; parietal pleura; lactiferous duct; abdominal fat; synovial joint; synovial membrane; saphenous vein / Top expressed in: somite; semi-lunar valve; intermediate mesoderm; aortic valve; ankle joint; endocardial cushion; sclerotome; interventricular septum; urethra; primitive streak; More reference expression data
BioGPS	More reference expression data
Gene ontology
Molecular function	sequence-specific DNA binding; DNA binding; DNA-binding transcription factor activity; HMG box domain binding; chromatin binding; RNA polymerase II cis-regulatory region sequence-specific DNA binding; core promoter sequence-specific DNA binding; protein binding; DNA-binding transcription activator activity, RNA polymerase II-specific; molecular function; DNA-binding transcription factor activity, RNA polymerase II-specific
Cellular component	cytoplasm; nucleus
Biological process	regulation of transcription, DNA-templated; somite specification; transcription by RNA polymerase II; sclerotome development; transcription, DNA-templated; multicellular organism development; hematopoietic stem cell differentiation; positive regulation of transcription by RNA polymerase II; somite development; biological process
Sources:Amigo / QuickGO
Orthologs
Databases	NCBI: entry; OMA: entry
Species	Human	Mouse
Entrez	4222	17285
Ensembl	ENSG00000005102	ENSMUSG00000001493
UniProt	P50221	P32442
RefSeq (mRNA)	NM_001040002; NM_004527; NM_013999	NM_010791
RefSeq (protein)	NP_001035091; NP_004518; NP_054705	NP_034921
Location (UCSC)	Chr 17: 43.64 – 43.66 Mb	Chr 11: 101.77 – 101.79 Mb
PubMed search
- Wikidata
View/Edit Human	View/Edit Mouse

Mesenchyme homeobox 1 (MEOX1) is a protein that in humans is encoded by the MEOX1 gene.

== Function ==
This gene encodes a member of a subfamily of non-clustered, diverged, antennapedia-like homeobox-containing transcription factor genes. The encoded protein may play a role in the molecular signaling network regulating somite development. Alternatively spliced transcript variants encoding different isoforms have been described.

== Interactions ==
MEOX1 has been shown to interact with PAX1 and PAX3.
