= Thymic carcinoma =

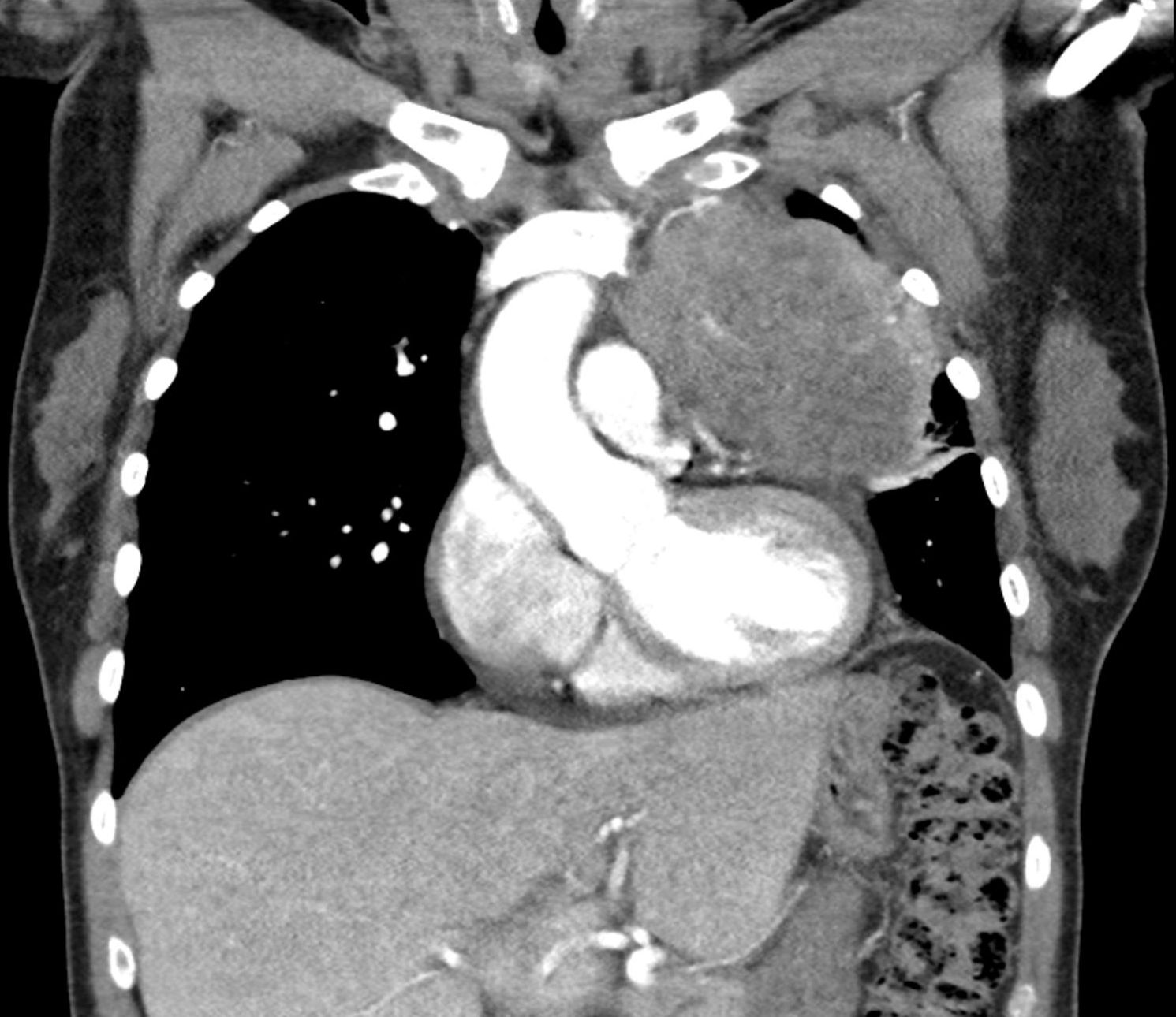
- Thymic carcinoma seen on CT.
- Specialty: Oncology

Thymic carcinoma, or type C thymoma, is a malignancy of the thymus. It is a rare cancer that is often diagnosed at advanced stages. Recurrence following treatment is common, and thymic carcinoma is associated with a poor prognosis.

== Epidemiology ==
A study examining cases of thymic carcinoma in the United States from 2001 to 2015 found a peak incidence from 70 to 74 years old and a higher incidence in males compared to females. After thymoma, thymic carcinoma is the second most common type of thymus cancer.

== Signs and symptoms ==
Early-stage thymic carcinoma is generally asymptomatic, and the development of symptoms is indicative of an advanced stage cancer. Signs and symptoms are non-specific and include chest pain, persistent cough, and difficulty breathing, which are related to progressive tumor compression of anterior chest wall structures. Superior vena cava syndrome may be associated with thymic carcinoma. Thymic carcinoma is rarely associated with paraneoplastic syndromes, unlike thymoma which has a strong association with myasthenia gravis.

== Pathology ==
Both thymoma and thymic carcinoma originate from thymic epithelial cells; however, the epithelial cells in thymic carcinoma appear abnormal histologically, as they are infiltrative and not arranged in a lobular pattern as seen in the normal thymus. Thymic carcinoma represents 20% of tumors derived from thymic epithelial cells. Compared to thymoma, the cells of thymic carcinoma behave aggressively; they are fast growing and have a higher likelihood of systemic spread.

The World Health Organization separates thymoma into categories from type A to C based on histology, with type C thymoma representing the equivalent of thymic carcinoma. Thymic carcinoma can be further divided into subtypes based on histopathological features. Though the genetic and molecular profile of thymic carcinoma has been shown to be different from that of thymoma, immunohistochemical cell markers specific for thymic carcinoma have not yet been identified.

== Diagnosis ==
Diagnosis of thymic carcinoma is based on a combination of clinical, radiologic, and biopsy findings. Most early cases are asymptomatic and found incidentally on chest radiographs as a mass in the anterior mediastinum. Further evaluation consists of additional imaging, such as CT, MRI, and PET, and tumor biopsy, which is the gold standard and provides the definitive diagnosis. Biopsy may be done prior to surgery by fine needle aspiration or during the surgery with concomitant evaluation by the pathologist. Other carcinomas with malignant spread to the thymus are on the differential diagnosis and must be excluded, as they may appear similar to thymic carcinoma on histopathological examination.

=== Staging ===
There is no consensus staging protocol for thymic carcinoma. Both the Masaoka staging system, designed for thymoma staging, and the TNM staging system have been proposed and used for thymic carcinoma, but consensus has been limited. The Masaoka staging system has been more commonly used, but it has been suggested to have limited applicability as most thymic carcinoma patients present at an advanced stage. The TNM system predicts prognosis if lymph node spread is observed; however, cancer spread to lymph nodes is uncommon. At the time of diagnosis, cancer spread outside of the chest cavity is estimated at less than 7%.

== Treatment ==
Treatment of thymic carcinoma depends on the stage, though initial resection of the entire tumor or surgical debulking is standard. Patients with complete resection of the tumor may undergo subsequent radiation therapy and may also require chemotherapy. For those with incomplete tumor resection, chemotherapy with or without radiation therapy followed by repeat surgical resection may be warranted. Other treatment options include hormone therapy, targeted therapy, and experimental immunotherapy.

== Prognosis ==
As thymic carcinoma tends to be diagnosed at later stages, prognosis tends to be poor, with some studies estimating 30 to 55% of patients survive 5 years following diagnosis. Recurrence following complete resection is common, with one case series finding a recurrence rate as high as 50%.
