= TBX1 =

Protein-coding gene in the species Homo sapiens

Identifiers
- Aliases: TBX1, CAFS, CATCH22, CTHM, DGCR, DGS, DORV, TBX1C, TGA, VCF, VCFS, T-box 1, T-box transcription factor 1
- External IDs: OMIM: 602054; MGI: 98493; GeneCards: TBX1
Available structures
PDB	Ortholog search: PDBe RCSB
PDB	List of PDB id codes 4A04

Gene location (Human)
Chr.	Chromosome 22 (human)
Band	22q11.21	Start	19,756,703 bp
Band	22q11.21	End	19,783,593 bp

Gene location (Mouse)
Chr.	Chromosome 16 (mouse)
Band	16 A3|16	Start	18,399,729 bp
Band	16 A3|16	End	18,409,421 bp
RNA expression pattern
Bgee	Human / Mouse (ortholog); Top expressed in: muscle of thigh; gastrocnemius muscle; biceps brachii; tendon of biceps brachii; Skeletal muscle tissue of biceps brachii; sperm; olfactory zone of nasal mucosa; vastus lateralis muscle; right lobe of thyroid gland; paraflocculus of cerebellum / Top expressed in: digastric muscle; lip; vestibular membrane of cochlear duct; external carotid artery; internal carotid artery; muscle of thigh; tibialis anterior muscle; temporal muscle; esophagus; vestibular sensory epithelium; More reference expression data
BioGPS	n/a
Gene ontology
Molecular function	sequence-specific DNA binding; protein dimerization activity; protein homodimerization activity; DNA-binding transcription factor activity; DNA binding; DNA-binding transcription factor activity, RNA polymerase II-specific
Cellular component	nucleus
Biological process	pattern specification process; negative regulation of mesenchymal cell apoptotic process; cellular response to retinoic acid; positive regulation of protein phosphorylation; semicircular canal morphogenesis; regulation of transcription, DNA-templated; epithelial cell differentiation; blood vessel morphogenesis; muscle organ morphogenesis; tongue morphogenesis; positive regulation of tongue muscle cell differentiation; positive regulation of epithelial cell proliferation; thymus development; mesenchymal cell apoptotic process; cell fate specification; negative regulation of cell differentiation; soft palate development; muscle cell fate commitment; coronary artery morphogenesis; muscle organ development; heart morphogenesis; outflow tract morphogenesis; vagus nerve morphogenesis; outer ear morphogenesis; hearing; cellular response to fibroblast growth factor stimulus; aorta morphogenesis; lymph vessel development; transcription, DNA-templated; outflow tract septum morphogenesis; ear morphogenesis; odontogenesis of dentin-containing tooth; multicellular organism development; development of the heart; thyroid gland development; determination of left/right symmetry; retinoic acid receptor signaling pathway; blood vessel development; positive regulation of mesenchymal cell proliferation; parathyroid gland development; inner ear morphogenesis; muscle tissue morphogenesis; cochlea morphogenesis; angiogenesis; neural crest cell migration; positive regulation of cell population proliferation; artery morphogenesis; middle ear morphogenesis; social behavior; embryonic cranial skeleton morphogenesis; embryonic viscerocranium morphogenesis; enamel mineralization; mesoderm development; cell population proliferation; face morphogenesis; anterior/posterior pattern specification; positive regulation of MAPK cascade; positive regulation of transcription by RNA polymerase II; pharyngeal system development; regulation of animal organ morphogenesis; regulation of transcription by RNA polymerase II; positive regulation of transcription, DNA-templated
Sources:Amigo / QuickGO
Orthologs
Databases	NCBI: entry; OMA: entry
Species	Human	Mouse
Entrez	6899	21380
Ensembl	ENSG00000184058	ENSMUSG00000009097
UniProt	O43435	P70323
RefSeq (mRNA)	NM_005992; NM_080646; NM_080647; NM_001379200	NM_001285472; NM_001285476; NM_011532; NM_001373938
RefSeq (protein)	NP_005983; NP_542377; NP_542378; NP_001366129	NP_001272401; NP_001272405; NP_035662
Location (UCSC)	Chr 22: 19.76 – 19.78 Mb	Chr 16: 18.4 – 18.41 Mb
PubMed search
- Wikidata
View/Edit Human	View/Edit Mouse

T-box transcription factor TBX1 also known as T-box protein 1 and testis-specific T-box protein is a protein that in humans is encoded by the TBX1 gene. Genes in the T-box family are transcription factors that play important roles in the formation of tissues and organs during embryonic development. To carry out these roles, proteins made by this gene family bind to specific areas of DNA called T-box binding element (TBE) to control the expression of target genes.

== Gene ==
The TBX1 gene is located on the long (q) arm of chromosome 22 at position 11.21, from base pair 18,118,779 to base pair 18,145,669.

== Function ==
The T-box 1 protein appears to be necessary for the normal development of large arteries that carry blood out of the heart, muscles and bones of the face and neck, and glands such as the thymus and parathyroid. Although the T-box 1 protein acts as a transcription factor, it is not yet known which genes are regulated by the protein.

TBX1 is thought to operate on the same developmental pathway as CHD7 which can be mutated in CHARGE syndrome.

== Clinical significance ==
Most cases of 22q11.2 deletion syndrome are caused by the deletion of a small piece of chromosome 22. This region of the chromosome contains about 30 genes, including the TBX1 gene. In a small number of affected individuals without a chromosome 22 deletion, mutations in the TBX1 gene are thought to be responsible for the characteristic signs and symptoms of the syndrome. Of the three known mutations, two mutations change one amino acid (a building block of proteins) in the T-box 1 protein. The third mutation deletes a single amino acid from the protein. These mutations likely disrupt the ability of the T-box 1 protein to bind to DNA and regulate the activity of other genes.

Loss of the TBX1 gene, due to either a mutation in the gene or a deletion of part of chromosome 22, is responsible for many of the features of 22q11.2 deletion syndrome. Specifically, a loss of the TBX1 gene is associated with heart defects, an opening in the roof of the mouth (a cleft palate), distinctive facial features, and low calcium levels, but does not appear to cause learning disabilities.

Mutation in TBX1 causes predisposition to hernias.
