= Diabetic embryopathy =

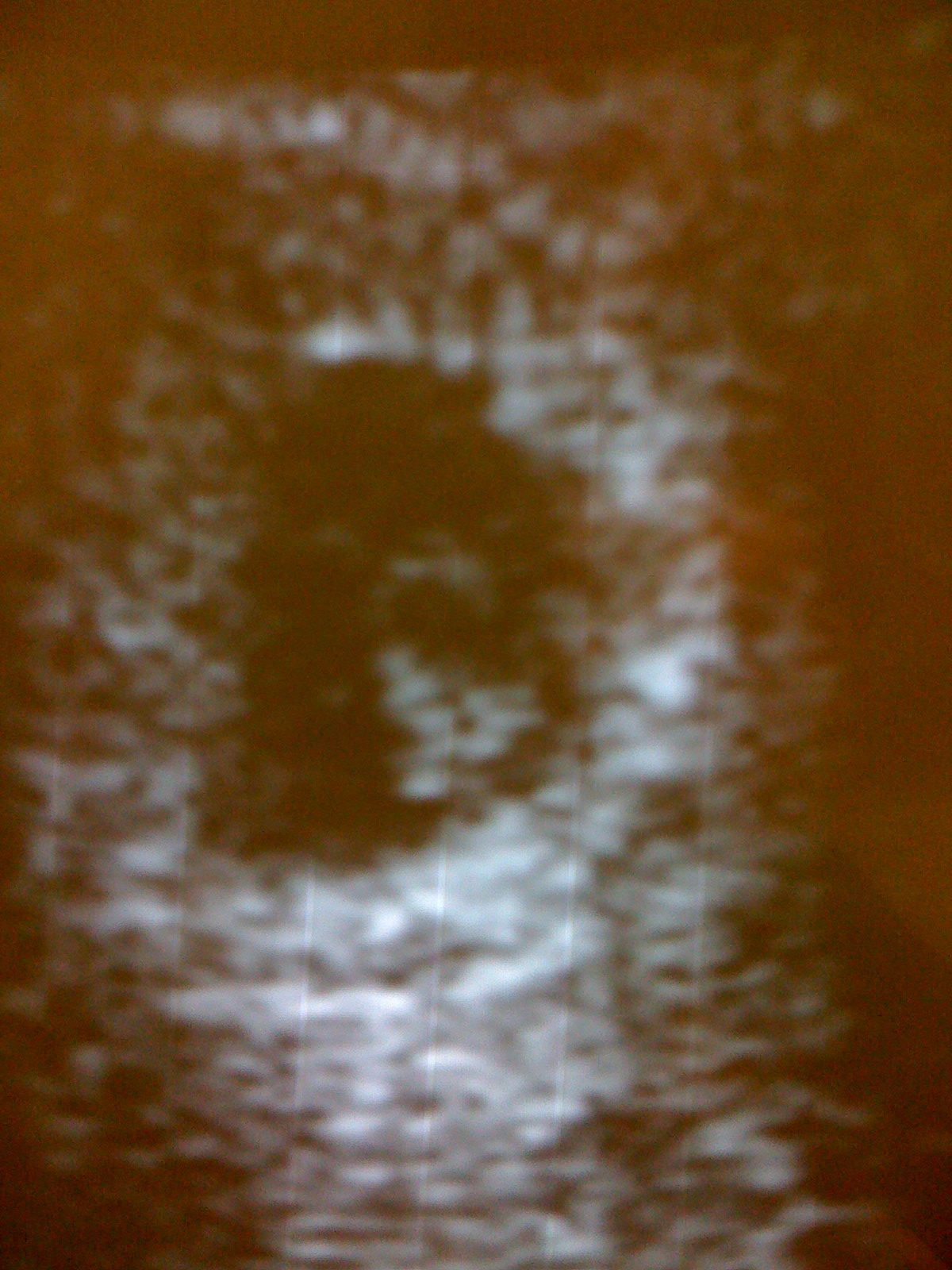
- Fetus of mother with diabetes
- Pronunciation: embrēˈäpəTHē
- Complications: major birth defects and spontaneous abortions
- Causes: maternal hyperglycemia

Diabetic embryopathy refers to congenital maldevelopments that are linked to maternal diabetes. Prenatal exposure to hyperglycemia can result in spontaneous abortions, perinatal mortality, and malformations. Type 1 and Type 2 diabetic pregnancies both increase the risk of diabetes-induced teratogenicity. The rate of congenital malformations is similar in Type 1 and 2 mothers because of increased adiposity and the age of women with type 2 diabetes. Genetic predisposition and different environmental factors both play a significant role in the development of diabetic embryopathy. Metabolic dysfunction in pregnant mothers also increases the risk of fetal malformations.

== Risk factors ==
Women with pregestational diabetes are at the highest risk for fetal malformations. The risk of congenital malformations in pregestational type 1 diabetes is directly correlated with glucose and glycohemoglobin levels in the blood. It is also inversely related to the gestational age at first exposure. The comorbidities associated with pregestational type 2 diabetes include advanced maternal age, lipid peroxidation and obesity. Overweight women (BMI ≥ 25) who develop gestational diabetes have an intermediate risk for malformations. Pregnant women who have gestational diabetes but don't have prediabetic markers experience perinatal outcomes that are similar to women without diabetes.

== Gestational consequences ==
=== Malformations ===
Type 1 diabetes in pregnant women can result in malformations that affect the musculoskeletal, urogenital, and central nervous systems. Most of these malformations occur within the first 4 weeks of gestation. Caudal dysgenesis is one of the most strongly associated diseases of diabetes. This malformation has the highest risk for diabetic embryopathy. Infants from diabetic mothers usually have several blastogenic malformations. Diabetic embryopathy is therefore an etiological subgroup of defects of blastogenesis that present different monotopic and polytopic developmental defects.

=== Abortion and perinatal deaths ===
Diabetic embryopathy may result in early or late spontaneous abortion and stillbirth. In maternal diabetes, 90% of pregnancy losses happen in the first trimester due to oxidative stress. Diabetic embryopathy abortions in the second-trimester are most likely due to severe birth defect, maternal metabolic derangement, placental insufficiency and fetal hypoxia due to membrane rupture.

== Pathogenesis ==
The development of birth defects associated with maternal hyperglycemia is multi-factorial. Environmental factors and genetic predisposition (paternal, maternal and offspring genome) are important in diabetic embryopathy. The diets of diabetic mothers impacts the rate at which malformations form in their offspring. Furthermore, there is evidence that resistance to certain malformations caused by diabetes is genetic. Epigenetics and its relationship with various environmental factors such as metabolism and diet play a significant role in teratogenesis. Hyperglycemia and associated teratogenic mediators influence DNA methylation, non-coding RNA expression, histone modifications and other epigenetic regulation mechanisms. Research is focused on exploring the impact of diabetic embryopathy on methylation signatures, which could potentially serve as a diagnostic biomarker for the condition.

== Prevention ==
=== Preconception ===
The probability of major birth defects in offspring of mothers with diabetes is 0.7-4.4% for glycohemoglobin levels <7%. For glycohemoglobin levels >10% the probability of major birth defects is 16.1-100% with an average of 26.6%. The National Institute of Health and Clinical Excellence in the UK indicated that glycohemoglobin levels <6.1% are correlated with the lowest risk of malformations while the reproductive risks are higher in women above this threshold and prohibitive for glycohemoglobin levels >10%.

Consumption of folic acid and antioxidant substances before fertilization result in a reduced rate of malformations in the offspring of mothers with diabetes. Antioxidants such as lipoic acid, vitamin C, and vitamin E, increase the probability of favorable prenatal outcomes in offspring of diabetic mothers because oxidative stress is a teratogenic mediator of hyperglycemia in mothers with diabetes.

=== After fertilization ===
Optimal weight and glycemic management encourage good outcomes because diabetes has the potential to influence the mother and fetus during the entire pregnancy. The integrity of embryofetal development and placental function can be monitored by fetal echocardiography and ultrasound scanning.

== See also ==
- Diabetic diet
