= FOXN1 =

Protein-coding gene in humans

Identifiers
- Aliases: FOXN1, FKHL20, RONU, WHN, forkhead box N1, TIDAND, TLIND
- External IDs: OMIM: 600838; MGI: 102949; GeneCards: FOXN1

Gene location (Human)
Chr.	Chromosome 17 (human)
Band	17q11.2	Start	28,506,243 bp
Band	17q11.2	End	28,538,900 bp

Gene location (Mouse)
Chr.	Chromosome 11 (mouse)
Band	11 B5|11 46.74 cM	Start	78,248,403 bp
Band	11 B5|11 46.74 cM	End	78,277,384 bp
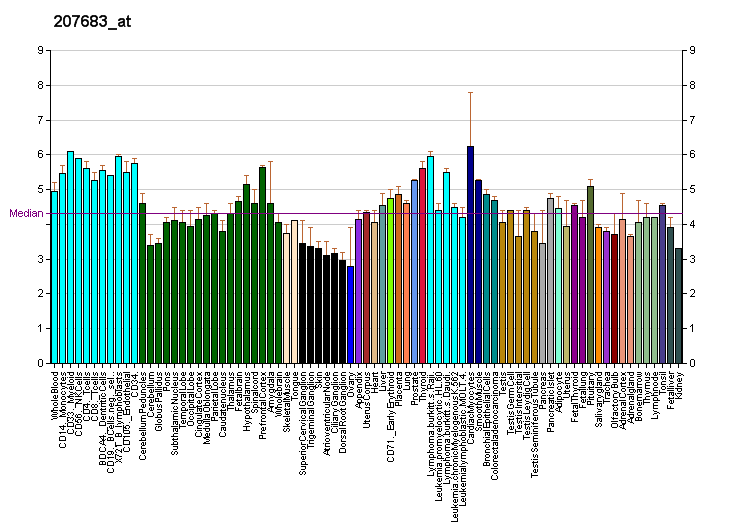
RNA expression pattern
Bgee	Human / Mouse (ortholog); Top expressed in: gingival epithelium; skin of thigh; skin of abdomen; human penis; skin of hip; vulva; nipple; oral cavity; mucosa of pharynx; vagina / Top expressed in: hair; outer root sheath of hair follicle; cortex of hair; lip; filiform papilla; thymus; skin of back; skin of abdomen; morula; embryo; More reference expression data
BioGPS	More reference expression data
Gene ontology
Molecular function	sequence-specific DNA binding; DNA binding; DNA-binding transcription factor activity; DNA-binding transcription activator activity, RNA polymerase II-specific; DNA-binding transcription factor activity, RNA polymerase II-specific
Cellular component	nucleus
Biological process	hair follicle development; defense response; nail development; regulation of transcription, DNA-templated; blood vessel morphogenesis; thymus epithelium morphogenesis; thymus development; regulation of transcription by RNA polymerase II; lymphocyte homeostasis; positive regulation of hair follicle development; epithelial cell proliferation; transcription by RNA polymerase II; transcription, DNA-templated; regulation of positive thymic T cell selection; keratinocyte differentiation; lymphoid lineage cell migration into thymus; T cell homeostasis; multicellular organism development; regulation of T cell differentiation in thymus; epidermis development; animal organ morphogenesis; regulation of gene expression; cell population proliferation; T cell lineage commitment; positive regulation of epithelial cell differentiation; cell differentiation; positive regulation of transcription by RNA polymerase II; hemopoiesis
Sources:Amigo / QuickGO
Orthologs
Databases	NCBI: entry; OMA: entry
Species	Human	Mouse
Entrez	8456	15218
Ensembl	ENSG00000109101	ENSMUSG00000002057
UniProt	O15353	Q61575
RefSeq (mRNA)	NM_003593; NM_001369369	NM_001277290; NM_008238
RefSeq (protein)	NP_003584; NP_001356298	NP_001264219; NP_032264
Location (UCSC)	Chr 17: 28.51 – 28.54 Mb	Chr 11: 78.25 – 78.28 Mb
PubMed search
- Wikidata
View/Edit Human	View/Edit Mouse

Forkhead box protein N1 is a protein that in humans is encoded by the FOXN1 gene.

== Function ==
Mutations in the winged-helix transcription factor gene at the nude locus in mice and rats produce the pleiotropic phenotype of hairlessness and athymia, resulting in a severely compromised immune system. This gene is orthologous to the mouse and rat genes and encodes a similar DNA-binding transcription factor that is thought to regulate keratin gene expression. A mutation in this gene has been correlated with T-cell immunodeficiency, the skin disorder congenital alopecia, and nail dystrophy. Alternative splicing in the 5' UTR of this gene has been observed. In the chick embryo, the FOXN1 gene is expressed in the developing thymus, claws and feathers. The expression of FOXN1 in feathers and claws indicates that it may regulate feather outgrowth. In feathers and claws, FOXN1 can potentially regulate expression of keratins similar to mammalian orthologs. In thymic epithelial cells, FOXN1 has been shown to bind to and regulate genes involved in T-cell maturation and antigen presentation.

== Medical significance ==
Pathogenic mutations in the FOXN1 gene are associated with congenital athymia, an ultra-rare disorder where the thymus fails to develop. This leads to severe immunodeficiency, with symptoms similar to severe combined immunodeficiency. The condition can be fatal if not diagnosed quickly, so screening is commonly provided for newborns in countries like the US.
