= PAX1 =

Protein-coding gene in humans

Identifiers
- Aliases: PAX1, HUP48, OFC2, paired box 1
- External IDs: OMIM: 167411; MGI: 97485; GeneCards: PAX1

Gene location (Human)
Chr.	Chromosome 20 (human)
Band	20p11.22	Start	21,705,659 bp
Band	20p11.22	End	21,718,481 bp

Gene location (Mouse)
Chr.	Chromosome 2 (mouse)
Band	2 G2|2 72.63 cM	Start	147,203,845 bp
Band	2 G2|2 72.63 cM	End	147,235,215 bp
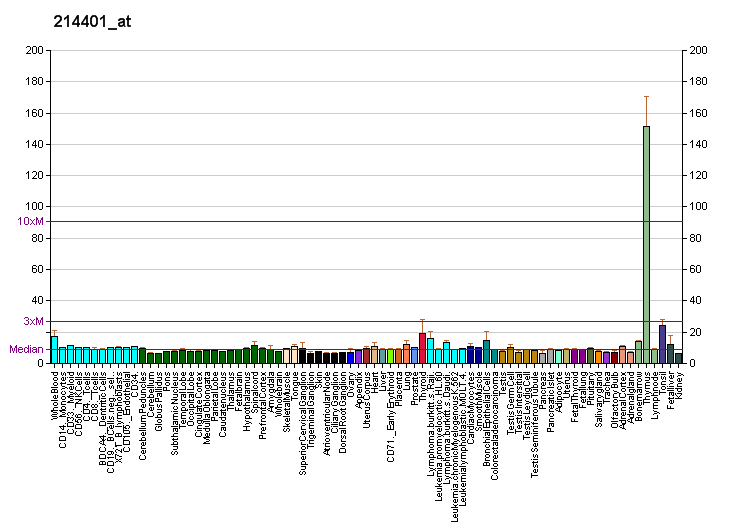
RNA expression pattern
Bgee	Human / Mouse (ortholog); Top expressed in: thymus; testicle; tibia; oral cavity; buccal mucosa cell; tonsil; amniotic fluid; olfactory zone of nasal mucosa; superior surface of tongue; bronchial epithelial cell / Top expressed in: axial skeleton; sclerotome; pharyngeal pouch; thymus; thoracic vertebral column; middle ear; Eustachian tube; sternum; urethra; male urethra; More reference expression data
BioGPS	More reference expression data
Gene ontology
Molecular function	DNA binding; DNA-binding transcription factor activity; RNA polymerase II cis-regulatory region sequence-specific DNA binding; DNA-binding transcription activator activity, RNA polymerase II-specific; DNA-binding transcription factor activity, RNA polymerase II-specific; protein binding
Cellular component	nucleus
Biological process	somitogenesis; multicellular organism development; pattern specification process; skeletal system development; CD4-positive, alpha-beta T cell differentiation; CD8-positive, alpha-beta T cell differentiation; bone morphogenesis; cell population proliferation; regulation of transcription, DNA-templated; transcription by RNA polymerase II; parathyroid gland development; sclerotome development; positive regulation of transcription by RNA polymerase II; transcription, DNA-templated; thymus development
Sources:Amigo / QuickGO
Orthologs
Databases	NCBI: entry; OMA: entry
Species	Human	Mouse
Entrez	5075	18503
Ensembl	ENSG00000125813	ENSMUSG00000037034
UniProt	P15863	P09084
RefSeq (mRNA)	NM_006192; NM_001257096	NM_008780
RefSeq (protein)	NP_001244025; NP_006183	NP_032806
Location (UCSC)	Chr 20: 21.71 – 21.72 Mb	Chr 2: 147.2 – 147.24 Mb
PubMed search
- Wikidata
View/Edit Human	View/Edit Mouse

Paired box protein Pax-1 is a protein that in humans is encoded by the PAX1 gene.

== Function ==
This gene is a member of the paired box (PAX) family of transcription factors which are essential during fetal development. It is required for the development of the ventral vertebral column. Its expression is limited to the pharyngeal pouches and the cells that surround the developing vertebrae near the top where the head will be established to help give rise to the neck and the start of the formation of the shoulders and arm buds.

Cancers, such as ovarian and cervical cancers, add a methyl (CH_{3}) group which silences, or disables, the gene which may be able to suppress the tumor by regulating when other cells divide and increase. A substitution or deletion of this gene in mice can produce variants of the mutant undulated which is characterized by segmentation abnormalities along the inner spine.

Mutations in the human gene may contribute to the condition of Klippel–Feil syndrome, which is the failure of the vertebrae to segment near the top of the spine and possibly further down with symptoms including a short, immovable neck and a low hairline on the back of the head.

== Interactions ==
PAX1 has been shown to interact with MEOX1 and MEOX2.

== See also ==
- Pax genes
