= Michael J. Lenardo =

American geneticist

Dr. Michael J. Lenardo, M.D.
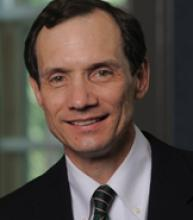

Personal details
- Born: December 1, 1955 (age 70) Chicago, Illinois, U.S.
- Education: Johns Hopkins University (BA); Washington University School of Medicine (MD)
- Awards: Irish Society of Immunology Award; American Association of Immunologists Steinman Award for Human Immunology Research
- Scientific career
- Fields: Molecular immunology Molecular genetics
- Workplaces: Washington University School of Medicine; National Human Genome Research Institute; National Institutes of Health

Michael Joseph Lenardo, M.D. is an American molecular immunologist and geneticist and is the chief scientific officer of Calico Life Sciences. Previously, he was the chief of the Molecular Development and Immune System Section and the founder and co-director of the Clinical Genomics Program at the National Institute of Allergy and Infectious Disease (NIAID), National Institutes of Health (NIH). Trained as a geneticist, molecular biologist, and immunologist, his research examines how cells of the immune system defend themselves against various pathogens, including viruses and bacteria. His research has investigated genetic abnormalities in the immune system, mechanisms of cell death, genetic diseases of immune homeostasis and autoimmunity, and development of novel diagnostics and therapeutics for diseases of the immune system. Lenardo's contributions to science and medicine have shown the possibilities of genomic research in developing precision medicine diagnoses and treatments for disease in humans. In 2006 he was appointed Officer of the Most Excellent Order of the British Empire (O.B.E.) by Queen Elizabeth II. In 2019 he was inducted into the National Academies of Sciences and the National Academy of Medicine, considered among the highest honors awarded to a U.S scientist and medical researcher respectively.

== Early life and education ==
Lenardo was born on December 1, 1955, in Chicago, Illinois, to Elizabeth (nee O'Leary; 1925–2008) and Guido D. Lenardo (1923–2011), a physician. He has 6 siblings Mary, Guy, Elizabeth (Lizzie), Timothy (Tim), and Eugene (Geno) Lenardo, the latter of which was part of the Filter rock band. He became interested in genetics while a student at Campion Jesuit High School during a senior project in which he prepared karyotypes of chromosomes for a hospital laboratory investigating birth defects in infants. His research interests branched into molecular genetics while an undergraduate student at Johns Hopkins University in Baltimore, Maryland, where he worked in a laboratory within the Department of Medical Genetics at the medical school. He graduated in 1977 with a Bachelor of Arts (B.A.) in Natural Sciences. He continued his research at Washington University in St. Louis, where he was introduced to molecular biology through virus research. He obtained a Doctor of Medicine (M.D.) in 1981. Upon graduating, Lenardo married Dr. Lesley-Anne Furlong, M.D., a fellow medical school classmate.

== Career ==
Following graduation, Lenardo pursued an internship in internal medicine at the University of Iowa Hospitals and Clinics. Subsequently, he was accepted into a fellowship program for oncology research at the University of Iowa's Division of Hematology-Oncology. He carried out molecular biology research in the laboratory of Dr. John Donelson, whose postdoctoral work involved contributions to British biochemist and Nobel Laureate Frederick Sanger's second Nobel Prize for DNA sequencing. In Donelson's laboratory, Lenardo was introduced to advanced molecular techniques, including DNA manipulation and sequencing, which encouraged him to pursue molecular research rather than clinical work.

After the fellowship, Lenardo began postdoctoral training at the newly opened Whitehead Institute for Biomedical Research at the Massachusetts Institute of Technology. He conducted research in molecular biology of mammalian systems and gene regulation under the mentorship of Nobel laureates David Baltimore and Philip Sharp. His postdoctoral training was productive and involved developing the functional assay for the newly described NF-kB binding complex, providing first evidence of the role of NF-kB in innate immunity, and co-discovering the Oct4 nuclear factor with Louis M. Staudt, among other contributions. Following the completion of his postdoctoral fellowship, he became an independent principal investigator at NIAID, National Institutes of Health.

=== National Institutes of Health ===
In 1989, Lenardo established an independent research section in the Laboratory of Immunology at NIAID, later becoming a senior investigator and section chief. He was named a NIH Distinguished Investigator in 2019, a title reserved only for the top 2-3% of investigators across all 27 institutes and centers at NIH.

Lenardo has published over 250 scholarly works and holds a number of medical patents. His work investigates human genetic immunodeficiencies through direct clinical research informed by a range of contemporary molecular, biochemical, and immunological approaches. This has resulted in the discovery of fundamental principles of cellular homeostasis involving previously unidentified molecules, including Fas, Caspase 8, Caspase 10, PI-3 kinase p110, CTLA-4 and its regulator LRBA, CD55, and the MagT1 magnesium transporter. As a result of Lenardo's expansive approach, his laboratory has been able to define the first human genetic disease related to each of these molecules, including Autoimmune Lymphoproliferative Syndrome, Caspase-8 deficiency syndrome, PASLI disease, XMEN disease, and most recently CHAI and LATIAE disease.

Lenardo's work reveals how these molecules control the homeostasis of both immune and non-immune cell types. In so doing, it has illuminated the origins and mechanics of various underlying immunological and genetic disease processes, together with concepts for successful treatments. His lab's 2017 identification of CD55 deficiency (which they named CHAPLE disease) led to the discovery of a safe and highly effective long-term treatment for a previously incurable, extremely debilitating and progressive disease. His discoveries have been found to be broadly applicable to common diseases such as cancer.

Lenardo has served on editorial boards for the European Journal of Immunology, the Journal of Experimental Medicine, Science Magazine, Magnesium Research, and Biology Direct. He is an adjunct professor of pathology at the University of Pennsylvania School of Medicine, and a Life Visiting Fellow at Clare Hall College Cambridge University. Lenardo has been a strong proponent of mentorship for emerging young scientists at the National Institutes of Health. He has been a member of the Board of Trustees of The Johns Hopkins University (1977–1981), is a member of the American Association for the Advancement of Science, elected AAAS Fellow 2009, the American Association of Immunologists, the American Association of Physicians, Federation of Clinical Immunology Societies, the Clinical Immunology Society, the European Society of Immunodeficiencies, and the American Society of Human Genetics.

He has founded or co-founded several joint research programs, including the NIH-Oxford-Cambridge Scholars Program (OxCam), the NIH-University of Pennsylvania Immunology Graduate Partnership Program, the NIH-Marshall Scholars, the NIH-Rhodes Scholars, the National M.D./Ph.D. Partnership Training Program, and the NIH-Institut Pasteur Infectious Disease and Immunology Program.

== Music ==
Lenardo is a member of The Affordable Rock 'n' Roll Act, a band composed of NIH physicians, scientists, and researchers, including NIH Director Francis Collins. Lenardo sings and plays guitar. The band has performed at the Library of Congress, National Building Museum, and several NIH events. Of performing with the band, Lenardo has stated, "I find that music—both listening and performing—unleashes creativity and optimism, which helps my scientific work on these devastating diseases."

== Awards and honors ==
- 2006: Officer of the Most Excellent Order of the British Empire (O.B.E.) conferred by Queen Elizabeth II
- 2009: Fellow, American Association for the Advancement of Science
- 2014: Irish Society of Immunology Award
- 2019: Member, National Academy of Sciences
- 2019: Member, National Academy of Medicine
- 2019: NIH Distinguished Investigator (top 2-3% section chiefs at NIH)
- 2020: Fellow, Academy of Medical Sciences of Great Britain
- 2020: American Association of Immunologists Steinman Award for Human Immunology Research
- 2021: Inaugural Fellow, Clinical Immunology Society

== Books ==
- Snow, Andrew L.; Lenardo, Michael J., eds. (2013). Immune Homeostasis: Methods and Protocols. Methods in Molecular Biology. Humana Press. ISBN 978-1-62703-289-6.
- Lenardo, M. J.; Kuang, A.; Gifford, A.; Baltimore, D. (1989). "Purified Bovine NF-κB Recognizes Regulatory Sequences in Multiple Genes Expressed During Activation of T- and B-Lymphocytes". In Neth, Rolf; Gallo, Robert C.; Greaves, Melvyn F.; Gaedicke, Gerhard; Gohla, Sven; Mannweiler, Klaus; Ritter, Jörg (eds.). Modern Trends in Human Leukemia VIII. Haematology and Blood Transfusion / Hämatologie und Bluttransfusion. Vol. 32. Berlin, Heidelberg: Springer. pp. 411–415. doi:10.1007/978-3-642-74621-5_71. ISBN 978-3-642-74621-5. PMID 2516499.

== General Interest Articles ==
- The National Institutes of Health/Oxford/Cambridge Scholars Program. A new approach to biomedical PhD training. In Leading the Way by Suzanne McCray, University of Arkansas press, Fayetteville, 2009.
- Lenardo, Michael. "Benjamin Banneker: How cicadas led this Maryland farmer to become the country's first recognized Black scientist | COMMENTARY". baltimoresun.com. Retrieved 2022-02-16.

== See also ==
- Autoimmune Lymphoproliferative Syndrome
- CHAPLE Disease
- XMEN Disease
- PASLI Disease
- CHAI Disease
