= Ambica =

Ambica may refer to:

- Ambica, a spelling variant of the given name Ambika
  - Ambica Banerjee (1928–2013), Indian politician
  - Ambica Charan Mazumdar (1850–1922), Indian politician
  - Ambica Shrestha, Nepalese entrepreneur
- Ambica Airlines, a defunct Indian airline

== See also ==
- Ambika (disambiguation)
