= Ambikapur =

Ambikapur may refer to:

- Ambikapur, Bangladesh, a village
- Ambikapur, Chhattisgarh, a city in India
  - Ambikapur Assembly constituency
  - Ambikapur railway station

== See also ==
- Ambikapur Part-X, a census town in Assam, India
- Ambika (disambiguation)
