= Ambika (given name) =

Ambika (pronounced "Ahm′-bik-uh") is an Indian given name. The name Ambika is a derivative name from Durga Ma. One meaning of it is the Goddess of the Moon or the Warrior Goddess. In Sanskrit word ambikā is "mother". Variants include Ambikah, Ambyka, and Ambykah.

== People with the name ==
=== Ambica ===
- Ambica Banerjee (1928–2013), Indian politician
- Ambica Charan Mazumdar (1850–1922), Indian politician
- Ambica Shrestha, Nepalese entrepreneur

=== Ambika ===
- Ambika Anand (born 1980), Indian TV anchor
- Ambika Bumb, American chief executive and scientist
- Ambika Chakrabarty (1892–1962), Bengali revolutionary
- Ambika Charan Choudhury (1930–2011), Assamese academic and activist
- Ambika Charan Guha (1843–1900), Indian wrestler
- Ambika Markam, Indian politician
- Ambika Mod, British actress
- Ambika Mohan, Indian actress in Malayalam films
- Ambika Pillai, Indian makeup artist
- Ambika Sanwa, Nepalese politician
- Ambika Sharan Singh (1922–1977), Bihar freedom fighter and politician
- Ambika Soni (born 1942), Indian politician
- Ambika Sukumaran, Indian actress in Malayalam films
- Ambika, Bar Raja, Ahom Queen Consort
- Ambika Tamang Yonzoon, nepali doctor passed from Bangladesh

== See also ==
- Ambika (disambiguation)
