= John J. O'Shea =

American physician and immunologist

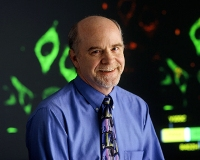

John J. O'Shea is an American physician and immunologist.

== Early life and education ==
O'Shea was born in Clason Point in the Bronx, New York. He graduated Phi Beta Kappa with a Bachelor of Science degree from St. Lawrence University and a Doctor of Medicine degree from the University of Cincinnati. He then served as an intern and resident in internal medicine at the State University of New York Upstate Medical University in Syracuse, New York.

== Research and career ==
He came to the National Institutes of Health (NIH) in 1981 for subspecialty training in allergy and immunology in the National Institute of Allergy and Infectious Diseases. He did additional postdoctoral work in the Cell Biology and Metabolism Branch in the National Institute of Child Health and Human Development. O'Shea is board certified in internal medicine and allergy and immunology.

He started his own group in the National Cancer Institute in 1989, and then moved to the National Institute of Arthritis and Musculoskeletal and Skin Diseases (NIAMS) in 1994 as chief of the Lymphocyte Cell Biology Section of the Arthritis and Rheumatism Branch. He was appointed chief of the Molecular Immunology and Inflammation Branch in 2002, and became scientific director and director of the NIAMS Intramural Research Program in 2005. O'Shea also served as acting director of the NIH Center for Regenerative Medicine from 2009 to 2011. O'Shea is also an adjunct professor in the Department of Pathology at the University of Pennsylvania.

=== Laboratory affiliations ===
Molecular Immunology and Inflammation Branch (MIIB)

The MIIB conducts basic and clinical investigations on the molecular mechanisms underlying immune and inflammatory responses in rheumatic and autoimmune diseases. A major focus of the Branch is the study of receptor-mediated signal transduction and how these events link to the regulation of genes involved in inflammatory responses. The Branch comprises one section:

Lymphocyte Cell Biology Section

Conducts research into the molecular basis of cytokine action to define the mechanisms by which these mediators regulate processes such as development, differentiation, memory, tolerance and homeostasis in immune cells. The section also studies patients with primary immunodeficiency and autoinflammatory syndromes.

=== Lymphocyte Signal Transduction ===
His area of scientific interest is cytokine signal transduction, dissecting the role of Jaks and Stats family transcription in immunoregulation. O'Shea and his colleagues cloned the tyrosine kinase, Jak3, and demonstrated its role in pathogenesis of severe combined immunodeficiency. O'Shea and colleagues at the NIH identified the role of Stat3 in regulating T cell cytokine production in Job's syndrome. More recently, O'Shea's laboratory has employed deep sequencing to understand the epigenetic regulation of T cell differentiation and the role of STATs in these processes.

=== Janus kinase (JAK) inhibitors ===
O'Shea was awarded two US Patents related to Janus Family Kinases and identification of immune modulators (7,070,972, and 7,488,808). O'Shea collaborated with colleagues at Pfizer including Paul Changelian to develop the Janus kinase inhibitor tofacitinib. Currently there are nine Janus kinase inhibitors approved by various agencies.

== Awards and memberships ==
- O'Shea was elected to the National Academy of Medicine, National Academy of Sciences, Association of American Physicians and the American Society for Clinical Investigation. He has received many awards, including: the U.S. Public Health Service Physician Researcher of the Year Award; the Paul Bunn Award in Infectious Disease; the Lee C. Howley Prize in Arthritis Research; the Irish Society for Immunology Public Lecture Award, Daniel Drake Medal; Ross Prize in Molecular Medicine, AAI-Stein Award for Human Immunology Research and the ASCI/Harrington Prize. He has been the recipient of the National Institutes of Health Director's Award six times (1998, 2008, 2010, 2013, 2022). He is also an ISI Web of Knowledge “Highly Cited Researcher”. He received the NIAMS Mentoring Award in 2003, and the NIH “Make a Difference” Office of Equal Opportunity Award in 2006. He was selected for the NYU Honors Lectureship, the Danny Thomas Lecture and more.
- O'Shea has served on the editorial boards of multiple journals, including Immunity, Journal of Experimental Medicine, Journal of Biological Chemistry, Journal of Immunology, and Blood. He has been an invited lecturer at numerous universities and international meetings in the U.S., Canada, Europe and Asia.
- O'Shea is one of the co-founders of the NIH Oxford-Cambridge Scholars Program in Biomedical Science, is a member of NIH-UPENN Immunology Program, and has served as a Howard Hughes Medical Institute Scholars Advisor.

== Publications ==
O'Shea has authored more than 370 articles.

- Ghoreschi, Kamran; Laurence, Arian; Yang, Xiang-Ping; Hirahara, Kiyoshi; O'Shea, John J. (2011). "T helper 17 cell heterogeneity and pathogenicity in autoimmune disease". Trends in Immunology. 32 (9): 395–401. doi:10.1016/j.it.2011.06.007. PMC 3163735. PMID 21782512.
- O'Shea, John J.; Lahesmaa, Riitta; Vahedi, Golnaz; Laurence, Arian; Kanno, Yuka (2011). "Genomic views of STAT function in CD4+ T helper cell differentiation". Nature Reviews Immunology. 11 (4): 239–50. doi:10.1038/nri2958. PMC 3070307. PMID 21436836.
- Yang, Xiang-Ping; Ghoreschi, Kamran; Steward-Tharp, Scott M; Rodriguez-Canales, Jaime; Zhu, Jinfang; Grainger, John R; Hirahara, Kiyoshi; Sun, Hong-Wei; et al. (2011). "Opposing regulation of the locus encoding IL-17 through direct, reciprocal actions of STAT3 and STAT5". Nature Immunology. 12 (3): 247–54. doi:10.1038/ni.1995. PMC 3182404. PMID 21278738.
- Ghoreschi, Kamran; Laurence, Arian; Yang, Xiang-Ping; Tato, Cristina M.; McGeachy, Mandy J.; Konkel, Joanne E.; Ramos, Haydeé L.; Wei, Lai; et al. (2010). "Generation of pathogenic TH17 cells in the absence of TGF-β signalling". Nature. 467 (7318): 967–71. Bibcode:2010Natur.467..967G. doi:10.1038/nature09447. PMC 3108066. PMID 20962846.
- Ghoreschi, Kamran; Laurence, Arian; O'Shea, John J (2009). "Selectivity and therapeutic inhibition of kinases: To be or not to be?". Nature Immunology. 10 (4): 356–60. doi:10.1038/ni.1701. PMC 2758543. PMID 19295632.
- Ghoreschi, Kamran; Laurence, Arian; o’Shea, John J. (2009). "Janus kinases in immune cell signaling". Immunological Reviews. 228 (1): 273–87. doi:10.1111/j.1600-065X.2008.00754.x. PMC 2782696. PMID 19290934.
- McGeachy, Mandy J; Chen, Yi; Tato, Cristina M; Laurence, Arian; Joyce-Shaikh, Barbara; Blumenschein, Wendy M; McClanahan, Terrill K; O'Shea, John J; Cua, Daniel J (2009). "The interleukin 23 receptor is essential for the terminal differentiation of interleukin 17–producing effector T helper cells in vivo". Nature Immunology. 10 (3): 314–24. doi:10.1038/ni.1698. PMC 2945605. PMID 19182808.
- Wei, Gang; Wei, Lai; Zhu, Jinfang; Zang, Chongzhi; Hu-Li, Jane; Yao, Zhengju; Cui, Kairong; Kanno, Yuka; et al. (2009). "Global Mapping of H3K4me3 and H3K27me3 Reveals Specificity and Plasticity in Lineage Fate Determination of Differentiating CD4+ T Cells". Immunity. 30 (1): 155–67. doi:10.1016/j.immuni.2008.12.009. PMC 2722509. PMID 19144320.
- Takatori, H.; Kanno, Y.; Watford, W. T.; Tato, C. M.; Weiss, G.; Ivanov, I. I.; Littman, D. R.; O'Shea, J. J. (2008). "Lymphoid tissue inducer-like cells are an innate source of IL-17 and IL-22". Journal of Experimental Medicine. 206 (1): 35–41. doi:10.1084/jem.20072713. PMC 2626689. PMID 19114665.
- Watford, W. T.; Hissong, B. D.; Durant, L. R.; Yamane, H.; Muul, L. M.; Kanno, Y.; Tato, C. M.; Ramos, H. L.; et al. (2008). "Tpl2 kinase regulates T cell interferon- production and host resistance to Toxoplasma gondii". Journal of Experimental Medicine. 205 (12): 2803–12. doi:10.1084/jem.20081461. PMC 2585846. PMID 19001140.
- Andersson, J.; Tran, D. Q.; Pesu, M.; Davidson, T. S.; Ramsey, H.; O'Shea, J. J.; Shevach, E. M. (2008). "CD4+FoxP3+ regulatory T cells confer infectious tolerance in a TGF- -dependent manner". Journal of Experimental Medicine. 205 (9): 1975–81. doi:10.1084/jem.20080308. PMC 2526184. PMID 18710931.
- Pesu, Marko; Watford, Wendy T.; Wei, Lai; Xu, Lili; Fuss, Ivan; Strober, Warren; Andersson, John; Shevach, Ethan M.; et al. (2008). "T-cell-expressed proprotein convertase furin is essential for maintenance of peripheral immune tolerance". Nature. 455 (7210): 246–50. Bibcode:2008Natur.455..246P. doi:10.1038/nature07210. PMC 2758057. PMID 18701887.
