= RAS-associated autoimmune leukoproliferative disorder =

RAS-associated autoimmune leukoproliferative disorder (RALD) is a rare genetic disorder of the immune system. RALD is characterized by lymphadenopathy, splenomegaly, autoimmunity, and elevation in granulocytes and monocytes. It shares many features with autoimmune lymphoproliferative syndrome and is caused by somatic mutations in NRAS or KRAS. This was first described by investigators João Oliveira and Michael Lenardo from the National Institutes of Health.

== Presentation ==
Clinically, RALD is characterized by splenomegaly, a relatively mild degree of peripheral lymphadenopathy, and autoimmunity. The autoimmune phenotype can present in childhood or adulthood and primarily includes autoimmune hemolytic anemia, ITP, and neutropenia. Some patients have a history of recurrent respiratory tract infections. It is unclear if increased risk for malignancy is part of RALD.

Importantly, however, the clinical and laboratory phenotype resembles juvenile myelomonocytic leukemia. The high fatality rate of this childhood blood cancer puts it in sharp contrast when compared to the relatively benign and chronic course of RALD. Approximately 15-30% of patients diagnosed with JMML have somatic, activating RAS mutations. However, due to the difficulty in distinguishing JMML from RALD, it is possible a subset of patients treated for JMML actually have RALD and could therefore avoid the aggressive JMML treatment. This distinction is under investigation.

== Genetics ==
RALD is caused by gain-of-function somatic mutations in the genes NRAS or KRAS. NRAS and KRAS are members of the RAS subfamily and are implicated in many types of cancer. Somatic mutations are changes in DNA that occur after conception. Although generally somatic mutations can develop in any cell of the body, in RALD the somatic mutations only reside in the blood cells. Because these mutations are acquired and not in the germline, they cannot be inherited or passed on to children.

=== Function ===
Somatic RAS mutations greatly diminish the GTPase activity within the cell. The reduced GTPase activity locks the cells in an activated state and degrades the pro-apoptotic BIM protein, thus making the cells resistant to apoptosis. In contrast to ALPS, this apoptosis defect does not involve the FAS pathway.

== Diagnosis ==
RALD patients show normal to modestly decreased total lymphocytes, mild to no elevation in αβ-double negative T cells, a relative expansion of B cells, and elevated granulocytes and monocytes. The absolute or relative monocytosis in particular is an important characteristic of this disorder and help differentiate it from ALPS. Autoantibodies are also common.

== Research ==
Investigators at the National Institute of Allergy and Infectious Diseases at the US National Institutes of Health currently have clinical protocols to study new approaches to the diagnosis and treatment of this disorder.
