= Nixon's sign =

- Purpose: Detecting an enlarged spleen

In medical diagnosis Nixon's sign is an alternative to Castell's sign, useful in identifying enlargement of the spleen (splenomegaly).

== Technique ==
The patient is first placed in the right lateral decubitus position. Percussion starts at the midpoint of the left costal margin and is continued upward perpendicular to the left costal margin. Normally, the level of dullness does not extend more than 8 cm above the costal margin and splenomegaly is diagnosed if the dullness extends beyond 8 cm.
