= Felty's syndrome =

Autoimmune disease

Felty syndrome
- Specialty: Rheumatology

Felty syndrome, is a rare autoimmune disease characterized by the triad of rheumatoid arthritis, enlargement of the spleen and low neutrophil count. The condition is more common in those aged 50–70 years, specifically more prevalent in females than males, and more so in Caucasians than those of African descent. It is a deforming disease that causes many complications for the individual.

== Signs and symptoms ==
The symptoms of Felty syndrome are similar to those of rheumatoid arthritis. Affected individuals have painful, stiff, and swollen joints, most commonly in the joints of the hands, feet, and arms. In some affected individuals, Felty syndrome may develop during a period when the symptoms and physical findings associated with rheumatoid arthritis have subsided or are not present; in this case, Felty syndrome may remain undiagnosed. In more rare instances, the development of Felty syndrome may precede the development of the symptoms and physical findings associated with rheumatoid arthritis.

Felty syndrome is also characterized by an abnormally enlarged spleen (splenomegaly) and abnormally low levels of certain white blood cells (neutropenia). As a result of neutropenia, affected individuals are increasingly susceptible to certain infections. Keratoconjunctivitis sicca may occur due to secondary Sjögren syndrome. Individuals with Felty syndrome may also experience fever, weight loss, and/or fatigue. In some cases, affected individuals may have discoloration (abnormal brown pigmentation) of the skin, particularly of the leg, sores (ulcers) on the lower leg, and/or an abnormally large liver (hepatomegaly). In addition, affected individuals may have abnormally low levels of circulating red blood cells (anemia), a decrease in circulating blood platelets that assist in blood clotting functions (thrombocytopenia), abnormal liver function tests and/or inflammation of the blood vessels (vasculitis).

=== Complications ===
- Recurrent infection
- Enlargement of the spleen causing too few red blood cells and platelets in the bloodstream
- Enlarged lymph nodes
- Skin hyperpigmentation
- Cutaneous ulceration

== Causes ==
The cause of Felty syndrome is unknown, but it has been found to be more common in those with chronic rheumatoid arthritis. Some patients share the HLA-DR4 and HLA-DRB1 serotype. This syndrome is mostly present in people having extra articular manifestations of rheumatoid arthritis. People with this syndrome are at risk of infection because they have a low white blood cell count.

== Mechanism ==
The underlying pathogenesis of Felty syndrome is not clear. It is thought to involve both humoral and cellular immune mechanisms, contributing to neutrophil survival and proliferation defects resulting in neutropenia.

=== Rheumatoid Arthritis ===
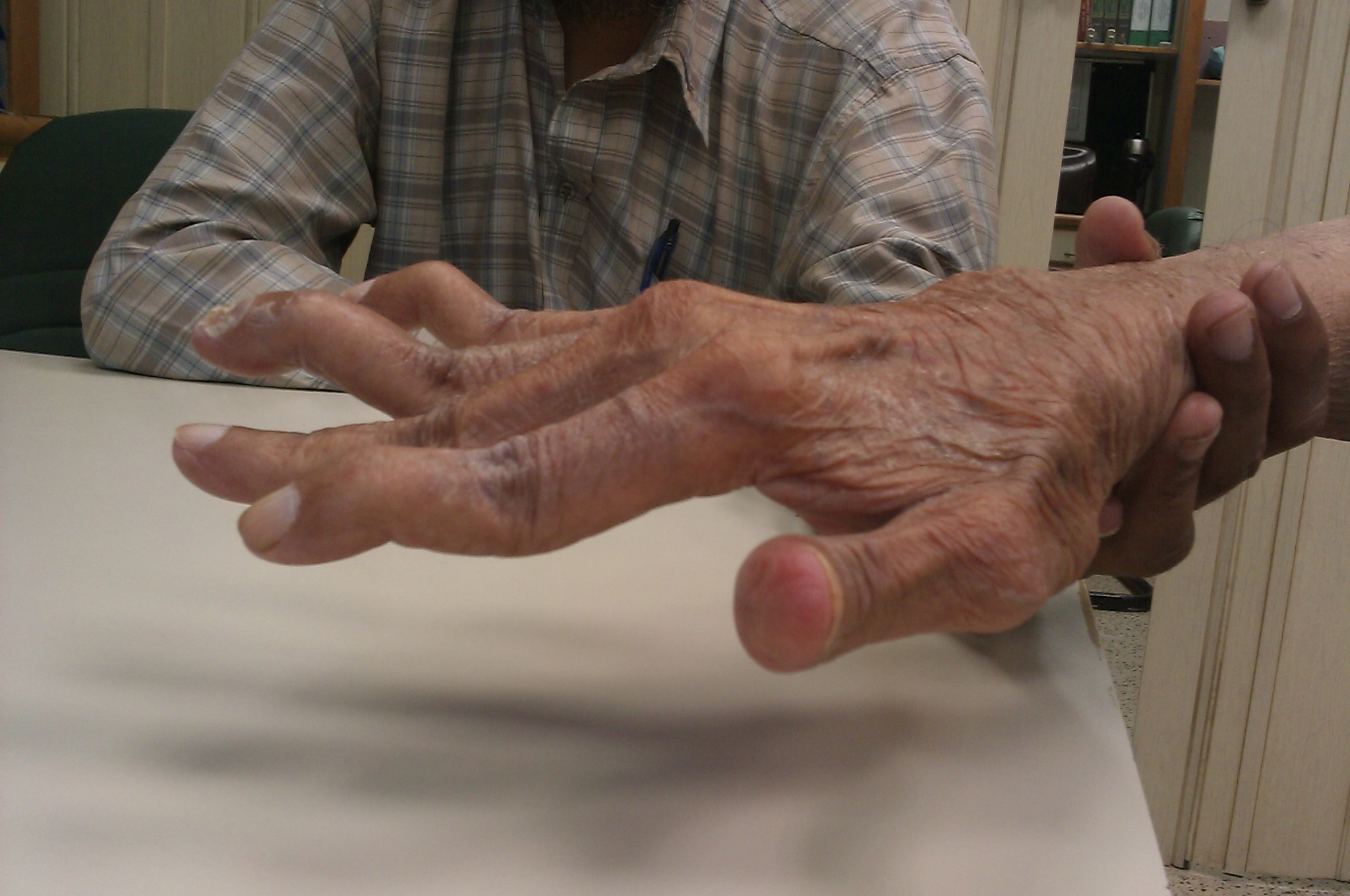
A 65-year-old patient with rheumatoid arthritis displaying swan neck deformity

Rheumatoid arthritis is an autoimmune disease that is characterized by inflammation of the synovial joints due to attack by the body's own immune system. In this condition, the white blood cells travel through the bloodstream to the synovial joints and release pro-inflammatory cytokines upon arrival. The result of this chemical release causes the synovial cells to release harmful chemicals in response as well as begin the growth of new blood vessels, forming a pannus. The pannus receives blood supply from the newly formed vessels and grows inward, invading the articular cartilage and bone within the joint. The damage to the once healthy tissue causes inflammation and ultimately fluid build-up in the joint. An accumulation of fluid results and the joints swell, slowly decreasing the space that keeps the bones from touching. If this condition is not treated, the joint space will completely narrow, causing ankylosis. At the advanced stage of ankylosis, joint mobility is completely occluded. Early presentation is commonly seen in the joints of hands and of the feet. As the disease progresses it can be seen in the knees, wrists, hips, and shoulders. This condition can affect and damage several other body systems such as the eyes, heart, lungs, and blood vessels.

Rheumatoid arthritis is a condition that cannot be cured but symptoms can be treated using certain medications alone or in conjunction. Due to the increased inflammatory response of the body's immune system, this condition can cause a reduction in red and white blood cells.

=== Neutropenia ===
In Felty syndrome, chronic activation of neutrophils progresses to neutropenia and unabated infections. Neutrophil activation and B-cell stimulation in the pathogenesis of Felty syndrome. Polskie Archiwum Medycyny Wewnetrznej, 122(7-8), 374-379. Neutropenia is a decreased concentration of neutrophils in the blood. Neutrophils are the most abundant cells among white blood cells and play an important role in the immune system by destroying bacteria via phagocytosis. Inflammatory chemicals draw neutrophils to the area where they congregate and fight infection. A decrease in the number of neutrophils stimulates an autoimmune response which leads to arthritis. The loss and destruction of neutrophils leading to neutropenia are, therefore, inflammation-driven due to the body's need for an immune response.

=== Splenomegaly ===
Splenomegaly is a condition of the spleen causing it to be enlarged. The splenic condition involving Felty syndrome is more specifically noted as inflammatory splenomegaly. The spleen is an important lymphatic organ that is involved in filtration of the blood by discarding old and damaged red blood cells as well as maintaining platelet levels. The spleen is a lymphatic organ, which means it is largely involved in the immune system and immune responses. When the spleen becomes enlarged, it is a strong sign of infection somewhere in the body and can be caused by inflammatory conditions such as rheumatoid arthritis. The increased need for production assistance of white blood cells to affected areas causes hyperfunction of the spleen. This increase in defense activities ultimately causes hypertrophy of the spleen, leading to splenomegaly. The spleen is found in the left upper quadrant (LUQ) of the peritoneal cavity and due to its enlargement, can cause stress on neighboring organs.

== Diagnosis ==
This condition affects less than 1% of patients with rheumatoid arthritis. The presence of three conditions: rheumatoid arthritis, an enlarged spleen (splenomegaly), and an abnormally low white blood cell count are indications that Felty syndrome is possibly occurring. This condition as a whole is difficult to diagnose due to its complexity given a combination of disorders. It is commonly overlooked or misdiagnosed as other conditions (e.g., leukemia, Systemic lupus erythematosus) because of the rarity and lack of good understanding about it. An acronym can be used to make recognizing this disease somewhat easier:

S: Splenomegaly

A: Anemia

N: Neutropenia

T: Thrombocytopenia

A: Arthritis (rheumatoid)

=== Conditions of the blood ===
A complete blood count (CBC) can be done to diagnose anemia (normochromic, normocytic), thrombocytopenia, and neutropenia. Abnormal liver function tests are commonly used to help in diagnosis as the spleen and liver are strongly affected by one another.

=== Splenomegaly ===
If rheumatoid arthritis is present and other symptoms occur that are not commonly found within RA itself, such as a palpable spleen, further testing should be done. A palpable spleen is not always a clinical significance, therefore CT scan, MRI, or ultrasound can be administered in order to help diagnose the condition. According to Poulin et al., dimensional guidelines for diagnosing splenomegaly are as follows:

- Moderate if the largest dimension is 11–20 cm
- Severe if the largest dimension is greater than 20 cm

=== Rheumatoid arthritis ===
RA in patients with Felty syndrome is chronic (after 10–15 years), and presents with increased severity along with extra articular manifestations. RA can be mistaken for other conditions such as gout if not clinically diagnosed. Diagnosis can be confirmed by use of X-rays or synovial fluid analysis.

== Treatment ==
There is no real treatment for Felty syndrome, rather the best method in management of the disease is to control the underlying rheumatoid arthritis. Immunosuppressive therapy for RA often improves granulocytopenia and splenomegaly; this finding reflects the fact that Felty syndrome is an immune-mediated disease. A major challenge in treating FS is recurring infection caused by neutropenia. Therefore, in order to decide upon and begin treatment, the cause and relationship of neutropenia with the overall condition must be well understood. Most of the traditional medications used to treat RA have been used in the treatment of Felty syndrome. No well-conducted, randomized, controlled trials support the use of any single agent. Most reports on treatment regimens involve small numbers of patients.

Splenectomy may improve neutropenia in severe disease.

Use of rituximab, methotrexate and leflunomide have been successful in reducing disease severity.

Use of gold therapy has also been described.

Granulocyte-colony stimulating factor is used to correct neutropenia and reduce the risk of infection.

== Prognosis ==
Prognosis is dependent on the severity of symptoms and the patient's overall health. Overall, the severity and extra-articular manifestations of RA have been decreasing gradually since MTX and biological treatments became available for the treatment of RA. The incorporation of G-CSF in the treatment of chronic neutropenia has resulted in a decrease in splenectomies.

== Epidemiology ==
The prevalence of Felty syndrome in patients with rheumatoid arthritis is reported to be approximately 1% to 3%, however, with the developments in medication therapies, the risk of Felty syndrome seems to be declining, and true prevalence is very low. Felty syndrome usually develops about 16.1 years after rheumatoid arthritis presentation, with increased risk in patients with a positive family history of rheumatoid arthritis. The disease follows the same pattern as rheumatoid arthritis and affects females 3 times more than males, is diagnosed in middle age, and affects the White population more compared to non-White populations.

== History ==
The condition was named after its discoverer, the American physician Augustus Roi Felty (1895–1964), who in 1924 saw a patient with a rare combination of conditions: chronic arthritis, splenomegaly, and leucopenia. His investigation of the medical literature revealed descriptions of four other cases. His findings prompted him to publish a description of the syndrome, which was subsequently named after him.

== See also ==
- Caplan's syndrome
- Still's disease or Still-Chauffard-Felty syndrome, the juvenile form
