= Castell's sign =

Medical sign assessed to evaluate splenomegaly

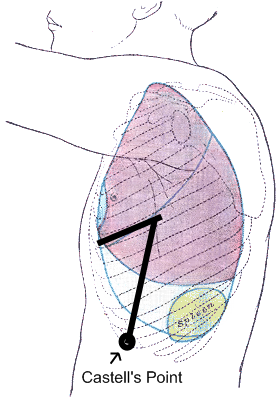
Castell's point

Castell's sign is a medical sign assessed to evaluate enlargement of the spleen (splenomegaly) and typically part of an abdominal examination. It is an alternative physical examination maneuver to percussion over Traube's space.

Splenomegaly, although associated with numerous diseases, remains one of the more elusive physical exam findings in the abdomen. Conditions, such as infectious mononucleosis, thalassemia, and cirrhotic liver disease may all involve splenomegaly, and as a result, the search for a reliable sign associated with this condition has been sought for generations. Currently, several such signs of splenomegaly exist, all of whose utility has been debated in medical literature. The presence or absence of splenomegaly, however, can be reliably appreciated on physical exam using Castell's sign in conjunction with other clinical information, increasing the positive predictive value of the test. When used in a decision-making rubric, Castell's sign becomes a valuable part of deciding whether to pursue further imaging.

== Technique ==
Castell's method involves first placing the patient in the supine position. With the patient in full inspiration and then full expiration, percuss the area of the lowest intercostal space (eighth or ninth) in the left anterior axillary line. If the note changes from resonant on full expiration to dull on full inspiration, the sign is regarded as positive. The resonant note heard upon full expiration is likely to be due to the air-filled stomach or splenic flexure of the colon. When the patient inspires, the spleen moves inferiorly along the posterolateral abdominal wall. If the spleen is enlarged enough that the inferior pole reaches the eighth or ninth intercostal space, a dull percussion note will be appreciated, indicating splenomegaly.

Some limitations, however, were also reported by Castell in his original paper. First, the presence of gross splenomegaly or profuse fluid in the stomach or colon may lead to the absence of a resonant percussion note on full expiration. Also, later articles have criticized the maneuver's reliability as falling more often to obese individuals and the amount of time the patient is post-prandial.

== Interpretation ==
The 1993 systematic review by the Rational Clinical Examination found that Castell's sign was the most sensitive physical examination maneuver for detecting splenomegaly when comparing palpation, Nixon's sign (another percussion sign), and Traube's space percussion:

- sensitivity = 82%
- specificity = 83%

In asymptomatic patients where there is a very low clinical suspicion for splenomegaly, physical examination alone is unlikely to rule in splenomegaly due to the inadequate sensitivity of the examination. Similar to many other findings in medicine, Castell's sign must be combined with clinical findings to rule in splenomegaly. To achieve a positive predictive value over 90%, the pretest probability must be 70%. Grover et al., recommends a greater than 10% preexamination clinical suspicion of splenic enlargement to rule in the diagnosis of splenomegaly effectively with physical exam. However, a 10% pretest probability only yields a positive predictive value of 35%.

To rule out an enlarged spleen, a pretest probability of 30% or less will yield a negative predictive value over 90% (calculation)

Given the paucity of physical exam findings to evaluate possible splenomegaly, Castell's sign is the most sensitive and is thus a good tool to teach in an advanced physical diagnosis course. Castell's is superior in sensitivity to other spleen percussion signs as well as palpation, which is not likely to be useful due to the extreme enlargement necessary to feel the spleen below the costal margin. Castell's sign is thus, in the appropriate clinical scenario, an important part of the abdominal physical exam.

== History ==
Donald O. Castell first described his sign in the 1967 paper, “The Spleen Percussion Sign,” published in Annals of Internal Medicine. Castell, a George Washington Medical School graduate, is also a Navy-trained gastroenterologist. While stationed at the Great Lakes naval base in northern Illinois, Castell studied 20 male patients, 10 of whom had a positive percussion [Castell's] sign and 10 patient controls with negative percussion signs. The spleen of each patient was then quantitatively measured using chromium-labeled erythrocytes and a radioisotope photoscan of the spleen. Castell showed those patients in the control group had a mean spleen size of 75 cm^{2} with a range of 57 cm^{2} to 75 cm^{2}, while those who had a positive percussion sign had a mean spleen size of 93 cm^{2} with a range of 77 cm^{2} to 120 cm^{2}. Castell concluded that his technique of spleen percussion was thus useful in identifying “slight to moderate degrees of splenic enlargement” and, as a result, constituted a “valuable diagnostic technique.”
