= Autosomal dominant CTLA‐4 haploinsufficiency with autoimmune infiltration =

Genetic immune disorder

- Other names: CHAI disease, CHAI
- CHAI follows an autosomal dominant pattern of inheritance
- Specialty: Immunology
- Diagnostic method: Genetic testing
- Differential diagnosis: LATAIE
- Treatment: HSCT
- Medication: Abatacept, Rituximab

Autosomal dominant CTLA‐4 haploinsufficiency with autoimmune infiltration, also known as CHAI disease or simply CHAI, is a rare genetic disorder of the immune system that illustrates the role of CTLA-4 in cell signaling. The condition is caused by heterozygous mutations in the CTLA4 gene, which encodes the cytotoxic T-lymphocyte antigen 4 (CTLA-4) protein. CTLA-4 is an immune checkpoint receptor expressed primarily on activated T cells and regulatory T cells. CTLA-4 is critical for peripheral immune tolerance by down-regulating immune responses following T cell activation and prevents excessive immune-mediated host tissue damage.

Mutations in this gene result in haploinsufficiency, meaning that one functional copy of the gene is insufficient to maintain normal immune regulation. This leads to impaired immune control and contributes to the development of autoimmune disease. Research has demonstrated that haploinsufficiency of CTLA-4 results in decreased suppressive activity of regulatory T cells and increased activity of effector T cells, which further contributes to immune dysregulation.

== Presentation ==
The disease is characterized by variable combination of immune and autoimmune complications. Reported features include enteropathy, hypogammaglobulinemia, recurrent respiratory infections, granulomatous lymphocytic interstitial lung disease, lymphocytic infiltration of non-lymphoid organs (intestine, lung, brain, bone marrow, kidney). Patients may also develop autoimmune disorders such as thrombocytopenia or neutropenia, and autoimmune hemolytic anemia and lymphadenopathy. These symptoms reflect widespread immune dysfunction and chronic inflammation.

=== Related disorders ===
CHAI is closely linked to LATAIE (LRBA deficiency with autoantibodies, Treg defects, autoimmune Infiltration, and enteropathy), another disorder involving immune checkpoint dysregulation. Both conditions highlight the critical role of CTLA-4 in regulating immune responses and maintaining immune homeostasis. LATAIE is caused by mutations in LBRA, a protein involved in the trafficking and stability of CTLA-4, pointing to the importance of CTLA-4 pathways in immune regulation.

== Mechanism ==
CTLA-4 is a negative regulator of T cell activation. The receptor competes with the stimulatory receptor CD28 for binding to the ligands CD80 and CD86 on antigen-presenting cells. When CTLA-4 binds these ligands, it suppresses immune responses by inhibiting T cell proliferation. This process is essential for maintaining immune tolerance and preventing an excessive immune responses. In addition to ligand competition, CTLA-4 can actively remove CD80 and CD86 from antigen-presenting cells via a process called trans-endocytosis, further limiting co-stimulatory signaling.

In individuals with CHAI, mutations in CTLA-4 reduce the expression or function of the CTLA-4 protein. This loss of function results in unchecked T cell activation, leading to immune dysregulation and chronic immune activation. As a result, the immune system begins to attack self-tissues, causing an autoimmune disease or autoimmune inflammation and lymphocytic infiltration of multiple organs.

== Diagnosis ==
Diagnosis of CHAI typically involves genetic testing to identify pathogenic variants in the CTLA4 gene. Additional laboratory testing may include immune profiling, which can reveal decreased CTLA-4 expression and abnormal T cell function. Because the symptoms overlap with other immune disorders, genetic sequencing is often required to confirm diagnosis.

Clinical presentation varies widely among patients, even those with the same mutation, indicating that the disease can affect individuals differently. Early diagnosis is important, as delayed recognition can lead to progressive organ damage due to chronic immune activation.

== Treatment ==
Treatment strategies for CHAI are aimed at controlling immune dysregulation, such as with the immunosuppressive agents Rituximab and Abatacept. Abatacept is a fusion protein that mimics the function of CTLA-4 by binding CD80 and CD86 and inhibiting T-cell activation. Abatacept helps restore inhibitory signaling pathways and reduces excessive immune activation. Other treatments may include other immunosuppressive medications such as corticosteroids or targeted immune therapies. Hematopoietic stem cell transplantation (HSCT) has been explored as a potential treatment for CHAI. HSCT involves replacing a patient's defective immune system with hematopoietic stem cells obtained from a healthy donor. These stem cells migrate to the bone marrow and give rise to new immune cells, including T cells and other leukocytes with normal CTLA-4 function. By restoring a functional immune regulatory pathway, HSCT may correct the underlying immune dysregulation associated with CTLA4 haploinsufficiency.

== Prognosis ==
Prognosis in CHAI disease varies based on the severity of immune dysfunction and response to treatment. Many patients improve with proper management, though untreated cases can result in progressive organ damage and increased complications.

== Epidemiology ==
CHAI is very rare and only a few cases have been described in the literature. It is likely underdiagnosed because of its overlap with other primary immunodeficiency and autoimmune diseases. The disorder is inherited in an autosomal dominant pattern and can affect both males and females.
