= NIH Oxford-Cambridge Scholars Program =

UK ccelerated doctoral program

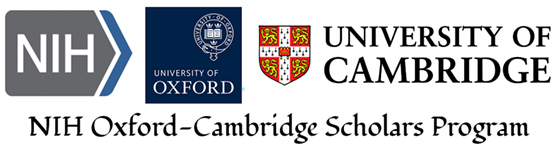
- Type: Public
- Established: 2001
- Parent institution: National Institutes of Health
- Affiliations: Oxford University, Cambridge University
- Website: https://oxcam.gpp.nih.gov/

The National Institutes of Health (NIH) Oxford Cambridge (OxCam) Scholars Program, founded in 2001, is an accelerated doctoral program in which scholars engage in collaborate biomedical research at the NIH and either the University of Oxford or the University of Cambridge. The program offers both PhD and combined MD/PhD training pathways through collaborations with various medical schools in the United States. Since the program's founding, over 200 students have completed their doctoral training through the program.

The program has affiliations with national and international scholarship programs including the Rhodes Scholarship, Marshall Scholarship, Gates Cambridge Scholarship, and Goldwater Scholarship. Partnerships have also been established with the Albert and Mary Lasker Foundation, the International Biomedical Research Alliance, and Foundation for Advanced Education in the Sciences.

== History and motivation ==
The OxCam program was founded in 2001 by Michael Lenardo and Richard Siegel in response to four limitations identified in biomedical graduate education within the United States. These shortcomings include:

- excessive completion time for PhDs
- limitation of doctoral programs to a single university or institution
- insufficient preparation for the global nature of contemporary science
- limited experience in collaborative research

The Universities of Oxford and Cambridge were chosen as partners by the NIH due to the strength of their biomedical research programs and their students' shorter time to PhD completion (3–4 years). The OxCam program also seeks to promote a more individualized training experience by minimizing required coursework or rotations.

== Program structure ==
OxCam Scholars design a dual-mentored, collaborative biomedical research project, with a supervisor at one of the 27 Institutes and Centers at the NIH and a supervisor at either the University of Oxford or the University of Cambridge. Scholars split time between their UK University and NIH Institute, typically allocating two years to each. No formal coursework or lab rotations are required. The project culminates in the conferral of a PhD from either Oxford or Cambridge.

Students wishing to combine their doctoral training with medical education can take advantage of one of three MD/PhD Training Pathways. In Track 1, students apply to Medical Scientist Training Programs (MSTPs) and the OxCam program simultaneously. Students in this pathway usually spend two years working towards their medical degree at the MSTP institution, then spend four years at Oxford or Cambridge for their doctoral training before coming back to finish their medical degree. In Track 2, students already enrolled in an MSTP or MD program apply to the OxCam program in their second year of medical training, then complete the same timeline as Track 1 students. In Track 3, students apply to and enroll in the OxCam program, begin their PhD studies at Cambridge or Oxford and the NIH, apply to MSTPs in their third year of doctoral training, then enroll in medical school upon completion of their PhD.

=== Funding ===
The OxCam program supports students throughout the duration of their doctoral studies. Tuition and fees, a stipend, medical benefits, and travel allowances are covered by the program. Students pursuing a combined MD/PhD degree will also receive funding for their medical education at participating MSTPs.

== Notable alumni ==
A significant number of OxCam alumni have gone onto prominent careers in academia, government, and entrepreneurship.

Name	University	Year	Known For
Paul Tesar	Oxford	2007	Discovery of epiblast stem cells
Ambika Bumb	Oxford	2008	Founder of Bikanta
Danielle Bassett	Cambridge	2009	Recipient of the 2014 MacArthur Fellowship
Stan Wang	Cambridge	2015	Founder and CEO of Thymmune Therapeutics
