= Traube's space =

Space on the left side of the human body

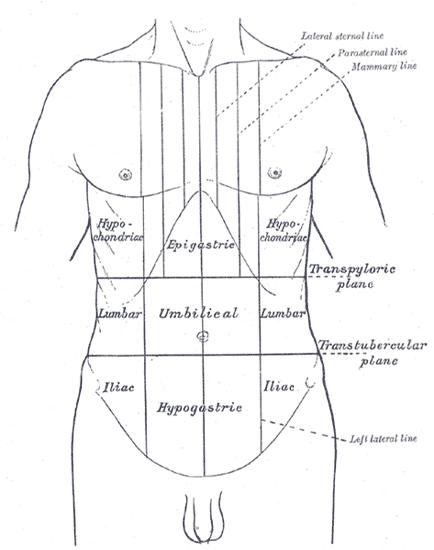
- Surface lines of the front of the thorax and abdomen. (Traube's space not labeled, but is in the left hypochondriac region.)

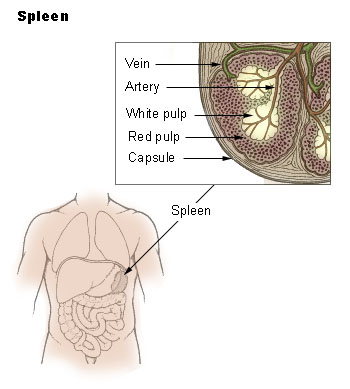
- Spleen

Traube's (semilunar) space is an anatomic space of some clinical importance. It is a crescent-shaped space, encompassed by the lower edge of the left lung, the anterior border of the spleen, the left costal margin, and the inferior margin of the left lobe of the liver. Thus, its surface markings are respectively the left sixth rib superiorly, the left mid axillary line laterally, and the left costal margin inferiorly.

== Percussion for splenomegaly ==
The normal human spleen measures about 125 millimeters in length, and enlargement of the spleen (splenomegaly) is an important clinical sign. There are 2 possibilities to evaluate splenomegaly in the clinical examination: percussion and palpation. Percussion can be done in this space.

Beneath Traube's space lies the stomach, which produces a tympanic sound on percussion. Dullness to percussion over Traube's space may indicate splenomegaly, although this can also be a normal finding after a meal or may indicate certain pathologies, e.g., enlarged left lobe of the liver, a fundus mass, a left pleural effusion, or a massive pericardial effusion. Assessing dullness to percussion may be more difficult in obese patients.

A 1993 systematic review by The Rational Clinical Examination found that, as a test for splenomegaly, percussion over Traube's space yields a sensitivity and specificity of 62% and 72%, respectively. Specificity may be higher if the patient has not eaten in the last two hours.

== Eponym ==
It is named for Ludwig Traube, although it was first described by his pupil in 1868. Another method was described by Donald O. Castell in 1967 (Castell's sign).

== See also ==
- Abdominal examination
