= Caspase-8 deficiency =

Caspase-8 deficiency state
- Caspase-8 deficiency is inherited in an autosomal recessive manner

Caspase-8 deficiency (CEDS) is a very rare genetic disorder of the immune system. It is caused by mutations in the CASP8 gene that encodes the protein caspase-8. The disorder is characterized by splenomegaly and lymphadenopathy, in addition to recurrent sinopulmonary infections, recurrent mucocutaneous herpesvirus or other viral infections, and hypogammaglobulinemia. Investigators in the laboratory of Dr. Michael Lenardo at the National Institutes of Health described this condition in two siblings from a consanguineous family in 2002, and several more affected family members have since been identified.

== Presentation ==
CEDS has features similar to ALPS, another genetic disease of apoptosis, with the addition of an immunodeficient phenotype. Thus, the clinical manifestations include splenomegaly and lymphadenopathy, in addition to recurrent sinopulmonary infections, recurrent mucocutaneous herpesvirus, persistent warts and molluscum contagiosum infections, and hypogammaglobulinemia. There is sometimes lymphocytic infiltrative disease in parenchymal organs, but autoimmunity is minimal and lymphoma has not been observed in the CEDS patients.

== Genetics ==
CEDS is caused by homozygous mutations in caspase-8. Caspase-8 is a 51 kb gene with 13 exons encoding for a 496 amino acid protein that maps to 2q33.1. Caspase-8 is involved in the initiation of the cell death signal cascade. Cell death counters proliferation of lymphocytes, allowing the immune system to achieve dynamic homeostasis whereby it can defend against pathogens and avoid autoimmunity. The two reported siblings have C>T transitions, causing R248W loss-of-function mutations in the gene. The mutations lead to functional caspase-8 deficiency by destabilizing the caspase-8 protein and inactivating its enzymatic capacity.

=== Inheritance ===
CEDS is inherited in an autosomal recessive manner. This means affected individuals have a mutation on each of their two caspase-8 alleles. In the case of the reported patients, the mutations were inherited from the consanguineous parents. Heterozygous carriers who have one mutated and one normal allele are healthy and lack immune-function abnormalities.

== Mechanism ==
The clinical phenotype of CEDS patients represented a paradox because caspase-8 was considered to be chiefly a pro-apoptotic protease, that was mainly involved in signal transduction. The defect in lymphocyte activation and protective immunity suggested that caspase-8 had additional signaling roles in lymphocytes. Further work revealed that caspase-8 was essential for the induction of the transcription factor "nuclear factor κB" (NF-κB) after stimulation through antigen receptors, Fc receptors, or Toll-like receptor 4 in T, B, and natural killer cells.

Biochemically, caspase-8 was found to enter the complex of the inhibitor of NF-κB kinase (IKK) with the upstream Bcl10-MALT1 (mucosa-associated lymphatic tissue) adapter complex which were crucial for the induction of nuclear translocation of NF-κB. Moreover, the biochemical form of caspase-8 differed in the two pathways. For the death pathway, the caspase-8 zymogen is cleaved into subunits that assemble to form the mature, highly active caspase heterotetramer whereas for the activation pathway, the zymogen appears to remain intact perhaps to limit its proteolytic function but enhance its capability as an adapter protein.

== Diagnosis ==
Clinical features suggesting CEDS should be investigated by immunologic studies assessing serum immunoglobulin levels, antibody function, and lymphocyte activation. Patients with CEDS have hypogammaglobulinemia, make poor antibody responses to pneumococcal polysaccharide antigens, and their B cells, T cells, and NK cells do not activate well to stimuli.

== Treatment ==
Given the rarity of this condition, the prognosis and optimal treatment are unclear. Patients who have CEDS have done well while maintained on intravenous immunoglobulin and prophylactic acyclovir to decrease sinopulmonary infections and mucocutaneous herpes virus outbreaks. Investigators at the National Institute of Allergy and Infectious Diseases at the US National Institutes of Health currently have clinical protocols to study new approaches to the diagnosis and treatment of this disorder.
