= Ambikapathy =

Ambikapathy is an epithet of the Hindu god Shiva, as the husband (pathy/pati) of Ambika (Parvati).

Ambikapathy may also refer to these Indian films:

- Ambikapathy (1937 film), a 1937 Tamil film directed by Ellis R. Dungan
- Ambikapathy (1957 film), a 1957 Tamil film directed by P. Neelakantan
- Ambikapathy (2013 film), a 2013 Tamil film directed by Anand L. Rai

== See also ==
- Ambika (disambiguation)
- Pati (disambiguation)
