= Splenic aspiration =

Surgical removal of fluid from the spleen

- Specialty: Hemotologist

Splenic aspiration is the removal of fluid from the spleen, often with the use of a fine-needle. It is rarely practiced in modern medicine. It is indicated only in cases of hypersplenism, or other cases of unexplained spleen enlargement. The Moeschlin technique is a common technique for performing a splenic aspiration. There are reports of using this technique in patients with kala azar.
