= Tropical splenomegaly syndrome =

Complication of malaria

Tropical splenomegaly syndrome, also known as hyperreactive malarial splenomegaly, occurs due to immunological overstimulation by repeated attacks of malarial infection over a long period of time. The condition is usually seen in areas where malaria is endemic, such as Africa and the Indian subcontinent. Tropical splenomegaly syndrome is characterized by massive splenomegaly, hepatomegaly, and markedly elevated levels of serum IgM and anti-malarial antibodies. The spleen is massively enlarged. It shows dilated sinusoids lined with reticulum cells. There is a marked erythrophagocytosis and lymphocytic infiltration of the pulp. Peripheral smear for malarial parasite is usually negative.

The condition may show features of hypersplenism in severe forms, like anemia and thrombocytopenia.

The treatment of tropical splenomegaly syndrome involves administration of an antimalarial drug followed by prophylaxis for prolonged periods of time. This removes the add-on antigenic stimulus of repeated malarial infections and allows the reticuloendothelial system to return to normal.
