= Ambika =

Ambika may refer to:

== Mythology ==
- Ambika (goddess), an avatar of the Hindu goddesses Durga, Parvati, and Mahadevi
- Ambika (Jainism), a Jain Yakshini goddess
- Ambika (Mahabharata), the wife of Vichitravirya was also the mother of Dhritarashtra, the father of the Kuaravas

== Other uses ==
- Ambika (given name), an Indian given name (including a list of persons with the name)
  - Ambika (actress) (born 1962), Indian actress in Malayalam, Tamil, Kannada, and Telugu films
- Ambika-class replenishment ship, a class of vessel in the Indian Navy
- Ambika River, a river in Gujarat, India
- Any of several entities (e.g. Ambika Paul Foundation, Ambika P3, Ambika House) connected to Swraj Paul, Baron Paul
- Ambika, the Sanskrit name of the plant Wrightia antidysenterica

== See also ==
- Ambikapur (disambiguation)
- Ambikapathy (disambiguation)
