= Trans-endocytosis =

Trans-endocytosis is the biological process where material created in one cell undergoes endocytosis (enters) into another cell. If the material is large enough, this can be observed using an electron microscope. Trans-endocytosis from neurons to glia has been observed using time-lapse microscopy.

Trans-endocytosis also applies to molecules. For example, this process is involved when a part of the protein Notch is cleaved off and undergoes endocytosis into its neighboring cell. Without Notch trans-endocytosis, there would be too many neurons in a developing embryo. Trans-endocytosis is also involved in cell movement when the protein ephrin is bound by its receptor from a neighboring cell.
