= CD55 deficiency =

- Other names: CHAPLE Syndrome, DAF deficiency
- CHAPLE Syndrome has an autosomal recessive pattern of inheritance
- Specialty: Medical genetics
- Symptoms: Gastrointestinal symptoms, edema, malnutrition, hypoalbuminemia, hypogammaglobulinemia, intestinal lymphangiectasia
- Causes: Genetic (autosomal recessive)
- Diagnostic method: Genetic testing
- Treatment: Eculizumab

CD55 deficiency, also called DAF deficiency or CHAPLE syndrome, is a rare genetic disorder of the immune system. CHAPLE stands for "CD55 deficiency with hyper-activation of complement, angiopathic thrombosis, and severe protein-losing enteropathy (PLE)." The disorder usually manifests in childhood and can be life-threatening. This condition was described by Özen, et al. in 2017.

== Signs and symptoms ==
CHAPLE is characterized by severe protein-losing enteropathy leading to hypoproteinemia. Symptoms can include abdominal pain, nausea, vomiting, diarrhea, loss of appetite, weight loss, and edema. People also have chronic malabsorption, which causes deficiencies in iron, ferritin, calcium, magnesium, folate, vitamin D and vitamin B12. Some patients may have recurrent respiratory infections associated with hypogammaglobulinemia. Severe thrombotic vascular occlusions may also be found among these patients.

== Genetics ==
CHAPLE syndrome is caused by mutations of the complement regulator CD55 gene leading to a loss of protein expression.

=== Inheritance ===
CHAPLE syndrome is primarily inherited in an autosomal recessive manner. This means that usually a child inherits a copy of the mutated gene from both parents, resulting in a homozygous defect.

== Pathophysiology ==
CHAPLE syndrome is characterized by complement-mediated autoimmune hemolysis and paroxysmal nocturnal hemoglobinuria. The protein CD55 (also called decay-accelerating factor) helps to regulate the complement cascade, part of the innate immune system, by regulating the amplification phase. When CD55 is absent, the complement system attacks red blood cells and causes them to be destroyed (hemolysis).

== Diagnosis ==
CHAPLE syndrome patients are generally diagnosed through a combination of clinical presentation, histology, and genetic testing. Although symptom presentation may vary, patients generally present with early-onset gastrointestinal symptoms, edema, malnutrition, hypoalbuminemia, and hypogammaglobulinemia. Histopathological assessment of intestinal biopsy samples or resections revealed extensive lymphangiectasia, and suggest a diagnosis of primary intestinal lymphangiectasia. Patients are also susceptible to large-vein thrombosis.

== Treatment ==
Once a diagnosis is made, the treatment is based on an individual's clinical condition. Kurolap and colleagues treated patients with off-label eculizumab, a humanized anti-C5 monoclonal antibody and complement inhibitor, and it was shown to have beneficial outcomes over an 18-month period. Investigators at Marmara University in Istanbul, Turkey, and the National Institute of Allergy and Infectious Diseases at the US National Institutes of Health in Bethesda, Maryland currently have clinical protocols to study new approaches to the diagnosis and treatment of this disorder. Pozelimab is the first therapeutic approved for treatment of CHAPLE disease, receiving FDA approval Aug 2023.
