= Ambika Bumb =

American businesswoman and medical researcher

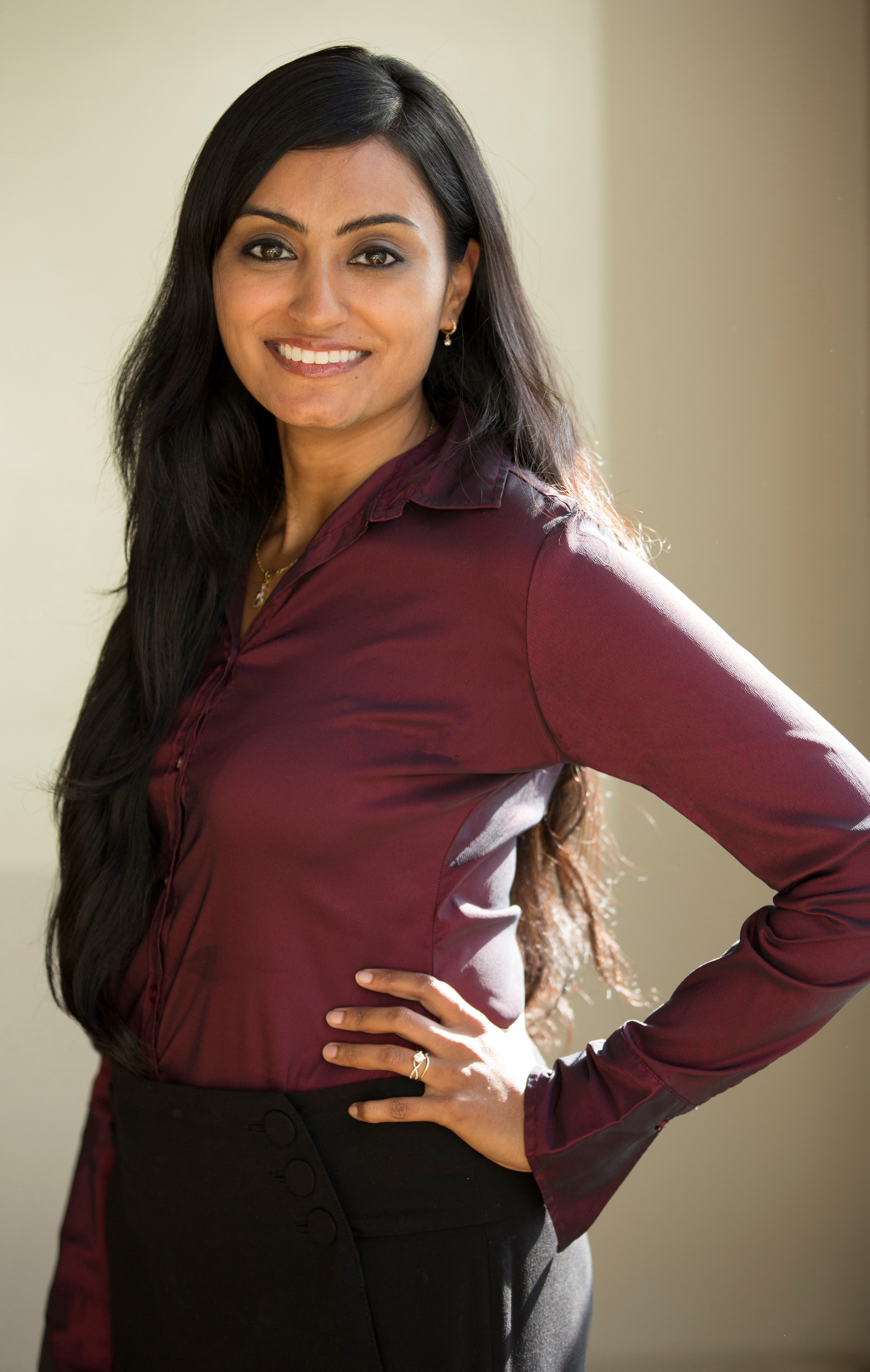
- Education: University of Oxford (PhD); Georgia Institute of Technology (BME)
- Occupations: CEO; Engineer; Scientist
- Organization: Bikanta
- Honors: Marshall Scholar

Ambika Bumb is an American biomedical scientist and businessperson. Bumb specializes in nanomedicine, utilizing nanotechnology for disease detection and treatment. As a postdoctoral researcher at the National Cancer Institute and the National Heart, Lung, and Blood Institute, Bumb made new discoveries with nanodiamonds which led to the launch of the biotech Bikanta. Bumb is currently the Deputy Executive Director at the Bipartisan Commission on Biodefense.

== Early life ==
Bumb was born to Indian Jain parents who immigrated to the United States in pursuit of higher education. Bumb graduated from Southside High School as valedictorian in 2002.

== Education ==
Bumb graduated in 2005 with a Bachelor of Science in Biomedical Engineering and a Minor in Economics from Georgia Institute of Technology. During her undergraduate studies, Bumb received the Helen E. Grenga Outstanding Woman Engineer Award and the E. Jo Baker President's Scholar Award. She researched tracking quantum dots in bone and cartilage. Additionally, she was an active leader in various campus organizations.

In 2008, Bumb completed her Doctorate in Medical Engineering in three years from University of Oxford as a recipient of both the Marshall Scholarship and the NIH-OxCam Program. Her graduate research focused on developing nanoparticles that could work with multiple types of medical imaging and studying how they could be used to detect diseases in animal models. She developed a triple-reporting nanoparticle and showed the technology's transferability across different disease types, including cancer and multiple sclerosis. The magnetic nanoparticles demonstrated strong potential in cancer diagnostics and therapy. Upon graduation, she continued on to two post-doctoral fellowships at the National Cancer Institute (2009-2011) and National Heart, Lung and Blood Institute (2011-2013).

== Career ==
Her breakthroughs in the areas of nanomedicine and diagnostics have led to multiple patents, publications. Bumb also founded her own biotech company, Bikanta, which uses nanodiamonds to allow academics and doctors to study and address disease at the cellular level. Bikanta was among the early biotechnology startups to receive funding from Y Combinator, and was a recipient of the California Life Science Institute's FAST Award, and named 1 of 4 Best Diagnostics Startups of 2015 by QB3. In an intervire conducted in 2018, Bumb explained that her upbringing influenced how she would later approach research, specifically ethical responsibilities in animal testing.

As Bikanta prepared to move the technology into clinical trials, the Theranos scandal went public and many investors pulled out of the diagnostics space. Bikanta was unable to raise the funding to proceed with the clinical trials.

Complementary to her scientific and commercial interests, Bumb has also been involved in national science policy initiatives, particularly related to nanotechnology. After Bikanta, Bumb began working as Health Science and Technology Advisor for the Secretary of State in the Office of Crisis Management and Strategy in December 2019, where she played a role in the government response to the COVID-19 pandemic. Later, she transferred to President Joe Biden's Council of Advisors on Science and Technology as Deputy Executive Director.

== Awards and recognition ==
- Marshall Scholarship
- The Council of Outstanding Young Engineering Alumni Award - Georgia Institute of Technology
- Helen E. Grenga Outstanding Woman Engineer
- E. Jo Baker President's Scholar Award
