= Bachelor of Science in Biomedical Engineering =

A Bachelor of Science in Biomedical Engineering is a kind of bachelor's degree typically conferred after a four-year undergraduate course of study in biomedical engineering (BME). The degree itself is largely equivalent to a Bachelor of Science (B.S.) and many institutions conferring degrees in the fields of biomedical engineering and bioengineering do not append the field to the degree itself. Courses of study in BME are also extremely diverse as the field itself is relatively new and developing. In general, an undergraduate course of study in BME is likened to a cross between engineering and biological science with varying degrees of proportionality between the two.

== Professional status ==
Engineers typically require a type of professional certification, such as satisfying certain education requirements and passing an examination to become a professional engineer. These certifications are usually nationally regulated and registered, but there are also cases where a self-governing body, such as the Canadian Association of Professional Engineers. In many cases, carrying the title of "Professional Engineer" is legally protected.

As BME is an emerging field, professional certifications are not as standard and uniform as they are for other engineering fields. For example, the Fundamentals of Engineering exam in the U.S. does not include a biomedical engineering section, though it does cover biology. Biomedical engineers often simply possess a university degree as their qualification. However, some countries do regulate biomedical engineers, such as Australia, however registration is typically recommended, but not always a requirement.

As with many engineering fields, a bachelor's degree is usually the minimum and often most common degree for a profession in BME, though it is not uncommon for the bachelor's degree to serve as a launching pad into graduate studies. ABET does accredit undergraduate programs in the field. However, even this is not a strict requirement since it is an emerging field and due to the young age of many programs.

== Curriculum ==
The curriculum for BME programs varies significantly from institution to institution and often within a single program. In general, a basic engineering curriculum, including mathematics through differential equations, statistics, and a basic understanding of biology and other basic sciences are hallmarks of a BME program.

Many BME programs have a series of tracks that focus on a particular area of study within BME. Often, the tracks also coincide with a particular engineering or science field. Examples of tracks include:

- Biomechanics: Focus includes medical devices, modeling of biological systems and mechanics of organisms. This track interfaces with mechanical engineering and often physiology.
- Bioinstrumentation/Bioelectrical Systems: Focus includes medical devices, modeling of biological systems, in particular circuit analogies to the nervous system, bioelectric phenomena and signal processing. This track interfaces with electrical engineering.
- Cell, Tissue and Biomolecular Engineering: This track is often quite diverse, with focus ranging from artificial tissues, modeling of biological systems, drug delivery, genetic engineering, biochemical engineering and protein production. This track can interface with chemical engineering, mechanical engineering, molecular biology, physiology, genetics, materials science and other fields.
- Medical Optics: Focus on medical diagnostics and medical optical technology. This track interfaces with optics, physics and electrical engineering.

Many other tracks may exist within specific programs as well as combinations of multiple tracks.

Another common feature of many BME programs is a capstone design project where students become involved in researching and developing technology in the field. At some schools, this culminates in the creation of medical devices and prototypes. Capstone design projects also often include exposure to issues like funding, regulatory issues and other topics that are related to careers in the field.

== Research and Industry Experience ==
An important feature of many programs is the inclusion of research and/or industry experience into either the curricular or extracurricular work done by students. Since BME careers often focuses on research or industrial applications of the field, many programs have seen fit to either encourage or sometimes require experience outside of the standard curricular requirements. Many research universities offer chances for students to participate in faculty research at the undergraduate level. Other schools have an industry practicum or co-ops to give students relevant work experience before graduation.

Students that participate in either research or industry during the course of study often see advantages when they enter the job market, as many employers prefer experienced candidates or offer higher pay to those with prior experience. Also, research or industry experience is often a factor in graduate school admission.

== Value of the degree ==
Recently, many universities, such as Case Western Reserve University have been implementing new initiatives to either create or expand upon undergraduate programs in BME. This is in part due to rising demand in the biotechnology sector and the increasing interest in biological research. A degree in BME instantly identifies a candidate as having training in both traditional engineering as well as biological science, which has become an increasingly desirable qualification as aspects of biology are permeating into other industries.

Since BME is a diverse field, many programs have a broad curriculum with students usually choosing to specialize in a particular aspect of BME. However, due to the diversity, some degree holders may find their education lacking in deep emphasis, which may prompt continuing studies in graduate school or by learning through experience.

Numerous rankings of undergraduate BME programs exist with highly varying basis for each ranking. As with many degrees, the reputation of a program may factor into the desirability of a degree holder for either employment or graduate admission. The reputation of many undergraduate degrees are also linked to the institution's graduate or research programs, which have more tangible factors for rating, such as research funding and volume, publications and citations.
