= Autoimmune lymphoproliferative syndrome =

Rare genetic medical disorder with abnormal lymphocyte survival

- Other names: Canale-Smith syndrome,
- Specialty: Immunology

Autoimmune lymphoproliferative syndrome (ALPS) is a form of lymphoproliferative disorder (LPDs). It affects lymphocyte apoptosis.

It is a rare genetic disorder of abnormal lymphocyte survival caused by defective Fas mediated apoptosis. Normally, after infectious insult, the immune system down-regulates by increasing Fas expression on activated B and T lymphocytes and Fas-ligand on activated T lymphocytes. Fas and Fas-ligand interact to trigger the caspase cascade, leading to cell apoptosis. Patients with ALPS have a defect in this apoptotic pathway, leading to chronic non-malignant lymphoproliferation, autoimmune disease, and secondary cancers.

== Signs and symptoms ==
All people with ALPS have signs of lymphoproliferation, which makes it the most common clinical manifestation of the disease. The increased proliferation of lymphoid cells can cause the size of lymphoid organs such as the lymph nodes and spleen to increase (lymphadenopathy and splenomegaly, present in respectively over 90% and over 80% of patients). The liver is enlarged (hepatomegaly) in 30–40% of patients.

Autoimmune disease is the second most common clinical manifestation and one that most often requires treatment. The most common autoimmune presentations include autoimmune cytopenias, which can be mild to very severe and intermittent or chronic. These include autoimmune hemolytic anemia, autoimmune neutropenia, and autoimmune thrombocytopenia. Other autoimmune manifestations can be similar to systemic lupus erythematosus (least common, affecting <5% of patients). Manifestations within the nervous system can include autoimmune cerebellar ataxia, Guillain–Barré syndrome, and transverse myelitis. Manifestations in the gastrointestinal system can include atrophic gastritis, and autoimmune hepatitis, esophagitis, colitis, and pancreatitis. Other manifestations can affect the skin (hives), lungs (bronchiolitis obliterans), or kidneys (autoimmune glomerulonephritis and nephrotic syndrome).

Another sign are cancers such as Hodgkin and non-Hodgkin lymphomas, which appear to be increased, possibly due to Epstein–Barr virus–encoded RNA-positivity. Some carcinomas may occur. Unaffected family members with genetic mutations are also at an increased risk of developing cancer.

== Genetics ==
This condition is usually caused by mutations in the FAS gene. Rarely cases due to mutations in other genes including the FAS ligand gene have been reported. The disease is inherited in an autosomal dominant manner, but it shows incomplete penetrance with up to 40% of people with a FAS mutation not showing symptoms.

In 2024, a study highlighted the significance of novel genetic markers in the diagnosis and management of ALPS, emphasizing the role of next-generation sequencing in identifying mutations in genes beyond FAS, such as CASP10 and FASLG.

== Diagnosis ==
- Elevated peripheral blood Double Negative T cells (DNTs)
  - Required for diagnosis
  - Immunophenotype: CD3+/CD4-/CD8-/TCRalpha/beta+
  - Measured by flow cytometry: Normal values <2.5% total T cells; <1% of total lymphocytes in peripheral blood
  - Marked elevations >5% virtually pathognomonic for ALPS
  - Mild elevations also found in other autoimmune diseases
  - Thought to be cytotoxic T lymphocytes that have lost CD8 expression
  - Unknown if driver of disease or epiphenomenon
  - May be falsely elevated in setting of lymphopenia or falsely decreased with immunosuppressive treatment
- Biomarkers
  - Polyclonal hypergammaglobulinemia
  - Elevated serum FASL
  - Elevated plasma IL-10 and/or IL-18
  - Elevated plasma or serum vitamin B_{12}
- Autoantibodies: Non-specific. Can have antibodies to blood cells (DAT, anti-neutrophil, anti-platelet). Also, can have positive ANA, RF, ANCA
- Defective in vitro Fas mediated apoptosis
  - Required for diagnosis under old definition. Now can be used to make diagnosis; however, not required to make diagnosis.
  - Time and labor-intensive assay.
  - T cells from patient and normal control supported in culture for >10 days with mitogen stimulation and IL-2 expansion and then exposed to anti-Fas IgM monoclonal antibody
  - ALPS patient T cells: Do not die with anti-Fas monoclonal antibody exposure. Normal T cells from unaffected patient do.
  - False negative in somatic Fas variant ALPS and FasL variant ALPS
- Genetic mutations in ALPS causative genes (see below)

=== Diagnostic algorithm ===
The old diagnostic criteria for the illness included: Chronic non-malignant lymphoproliferation, elevated peripheral blood DNTs and defective in vitro Fas mediated apoptosis.

The new criteria require chronic non-malignant lymphoproliferation (over six months lymphadenopathy and/or splenomegaly), elevated peripheral blood DNTs. A primary accessory in diagnosis is defective in vitro Fas mediated apoptosis and somatic or germline mutation in ALPS causative gene (FAS, FASL, CASP10).

The secondary accessory in diagnosis are elevated biomarkers (plasma sFASL over 200 pg/ml, plasma IL-10 >20 pg/ml, plasma or serum vitamin B_{12} >1500 ng/L, Plasma IL-18 >500pg/ml) and immunohistochemical findings on biopsy consistent with ALPS as determined by an experienced hematopathologist. Another sign is autoimmune cytopenias and polyclonal hypergammaglobulinemia and a family history of ALPS or non-malignant lymphoproliferation.

A definitive diagnosis is chronic non-malignant lymphoproliferation and/or elevated peripheral blood DNTs plus one primary accessory criterion. A probable diagnosis is the same but with one secondary accessory criterion.

=== Classification ===
2003 nomenclature

- IA – Fas
- IB – Fas ligand
- IIA – Caspase 10
- IIB – Caspase 8
- III – unknown
- IV – Neuroblastoma RAS viral oncogene homolog

Revised nomenclature (2010)

- ALPS-FAS: Fas. Germline FAS mutations. 70% of patients. Autosomal dominant. Dominant negative and haploinsufficient mutations described.
- ALPS-sFAS: Fas. Somatic FAS mutations in DNT compartment. 10% of patients
- ALPS-FASL: Fas ligand. Germline FASL mutations. 3 reported cases
- ALPS-CASP10: Caspase 10. Germline CASP10 mutation. 2% of patients
- ALPS-U: Undefined. 20% of patients
- CEDS: Caspase 8 deficiency state. No longer considered a subtype of ALPS but distinct disorder
- RALD: NRAS, KRAS. Somatic mutations in NRAS and KRAS in lymphocyte compartment. No longer considered a subtype of ALPS but distinct disease

== Treatment ==
Treatment is most commonly directed at autoimmune disease and may be needed to treat bulky lymphoproliferation. First line therapies include corticosteroids (very active but toxic with chronic use), and IVIgG, which are not as effective as in other immune cytopenia syndromes.

Second line therapies include: mycophenolate mofetil (cellcept) which inactivates inosine monophosphate, most studied in clinical trials with responses varying (relapse, resolution, partial response). It does not affect lymphoproliferation or reduce DNTs, with no drug-drug interactions. This treatment is commonly used agent in patients who require chronic treatment based on tolerance and efficacy. It may cause hypogammaglobulinemia (transient) requiring IVIgG replacement.

Sirolimus (rapamycin, rapamune) which is a mTOR (mammalian target of rapamycin) inhibitor can be active in most patients and can in some cases lead to complete or near-complete resolution of autoimmune disease (>90%) With this treatment most patients have complete resolution of lymphoproliferation, including lymphadenopathy and splenomegaly (>90%) and have elimination of peripheral blood DNTs. Sirolimus may not be as immune suppressive in normal lymphocytes as other agents. Some patients have had improvement in immune function with transition from cellcept to rapamycin and it has not been reported to cause hypogammaglobulinemia. Hypothetically, Sirolimus may have lower risk of secondary cancers as opposed to other immune suppressants and requires therapeutic drug monitoring. It is the second most commonly used agent in patients that require chronic therapy. It is mostly well tolerated (though side effects include mucositis, diarrhea, hyperlipidemia, delayed wound healing) with drug-drug interactions. It has better activity against autoimmune disease and lymphoproliferation than mycophenolate mofetil and other drugs; however, sirolimus requires therapeutic drug monitoring and can cause mucositis. The goal serum trough is 5–15 ng/ml with Sirolimus and PCP prophylaxis is usually not needed. Sirolimus is a mTOR inhibitor active against lymphomas, especially EBV+ lymphomas. However, a risk with any immunosuppressive agent in a pre-cancerous syndrome is decreased tumor immunosurvellence.

Other treatments may include drugs like Fansidar, mercaptopurine: More commonly used in Europe. Another is rituximab but this can cause protracted hypogammaglobulinemia and a splenectomy but there is a >30% risk of pneumococcal sepsis even with vaccination and antibiotic prophylaxis
