= Ambikapur Part-X =

- Town
- Location in Assam, India Ambikapur Part-X (India)
- Coordinates: 24.8167°N 92.8°E
- Country: India
- State: Assam
- District: Cachar

Population (2001)
  - Total: 10,014

Languages
  - Official: Bengali and Meitei (Manipuri)
- Time zone: UTC+5:30 (IST)
- Vehicle registration: AS

Ambikapur Part-X is a census town in Cachar district in the state of Assam, India.

== Demographics ==
Bengali and Meitei (Manipuri) are the official languages of this place.

As of 2001 India census, Ambikapur Part-X had a population of 10,014. Males constitute 53% of the population and females 47%. Ambikapur Part-X has an average literacy rate of 71%, higher than the national average of 59.5%; with 56% of the males and 44% of females literate. 12% of the population is under 6 years of age.
