= Littoral cell angioma =

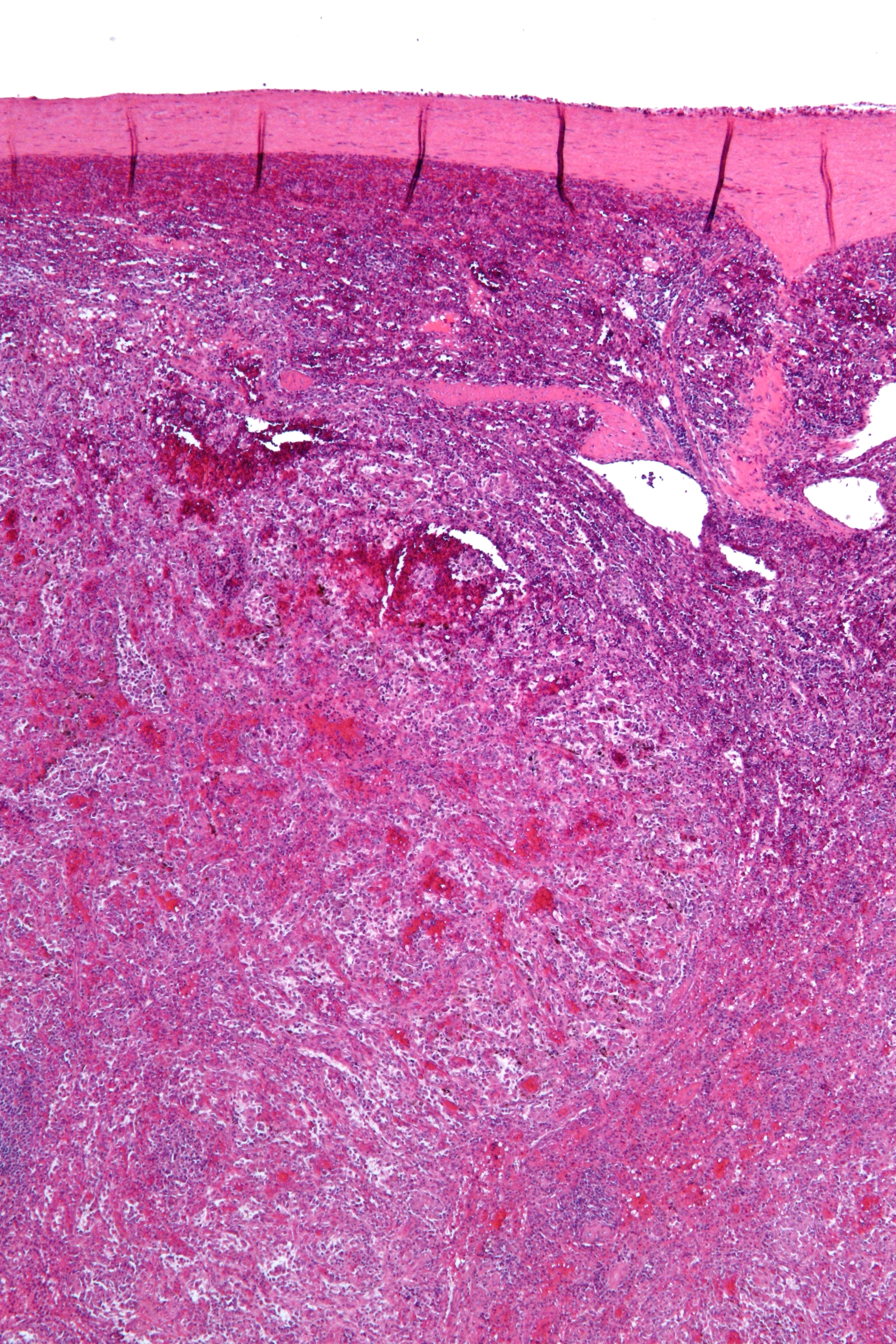
- Low magnification micrograph of a littoral cell angioma. H&E stain.
- Specialty: Pathology

Littoral cell angioma, abbreviated LCA, and formally known as littoral cell angioma of the spleen, is a benign tumour of the spleen that arises from the cells that line the red pulp.

== Symptoms ==
LCAs most often are not clinically detectable. On occasion, their first presentation may be with splenic rupture.

Most patients show no symptoms and the tumours are found incidentally.

An indication may be a considerable lowering of blood platelets.

== Diagnosis ==
Littoral cell angiomas show in CT scans. They are diagnosed by pathologists by taking a sample of the tumour via Fine Needle Aspiration or Core Needle Aspiration or from a splenectomy. Histologically, they have anastoming small vascular channels and cystic spaces with papillary projections.

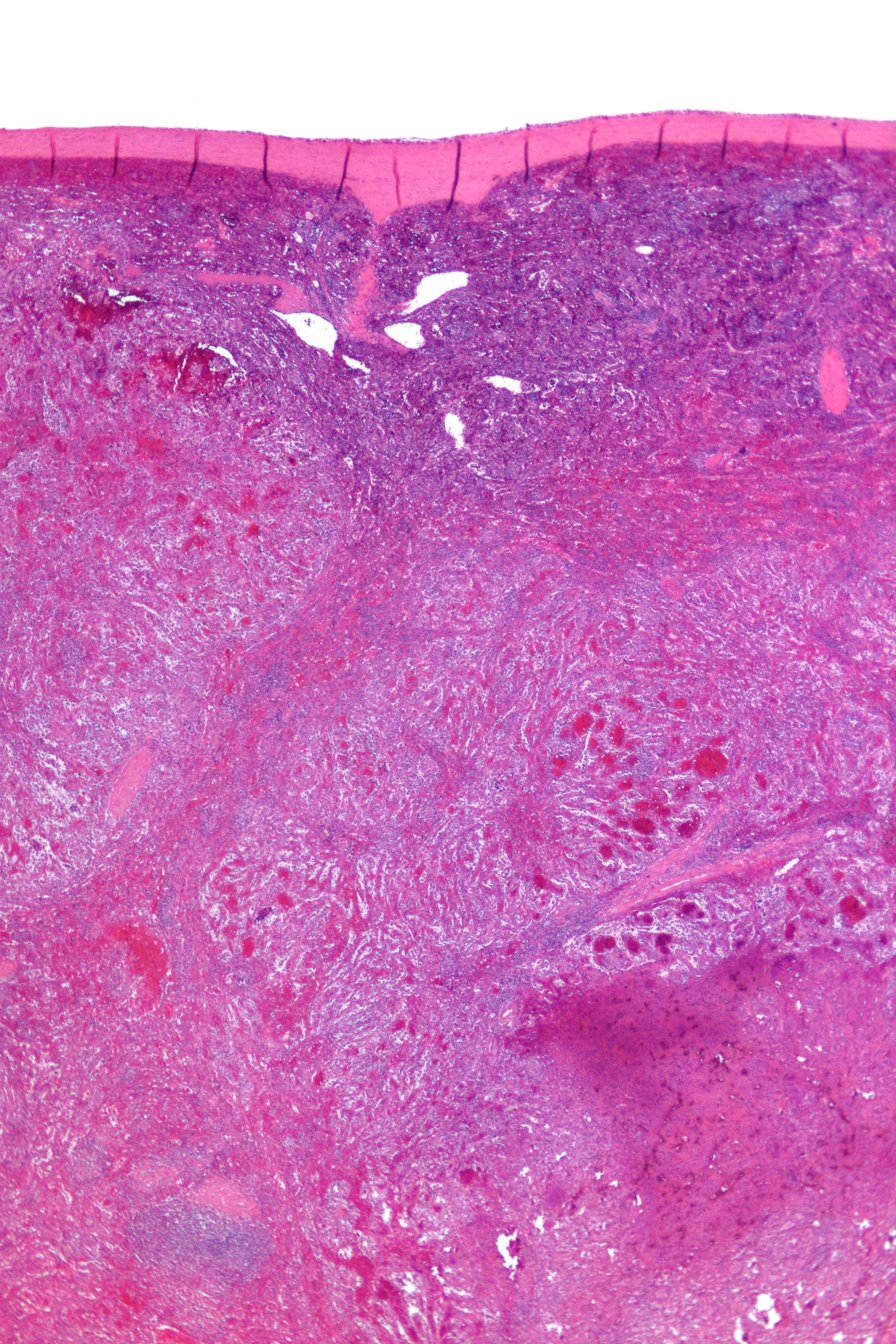
Very low mag.

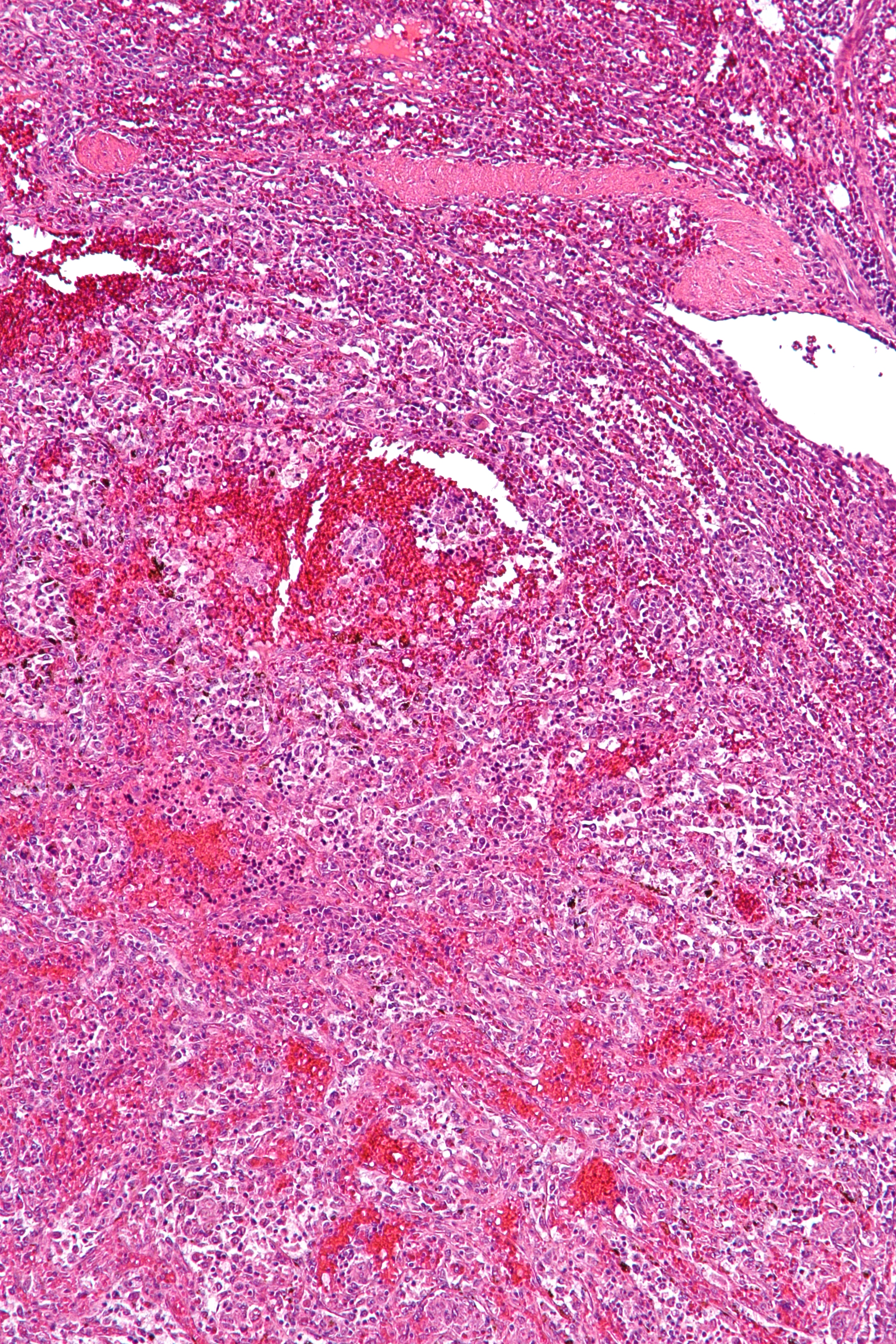
Intermed. mag.

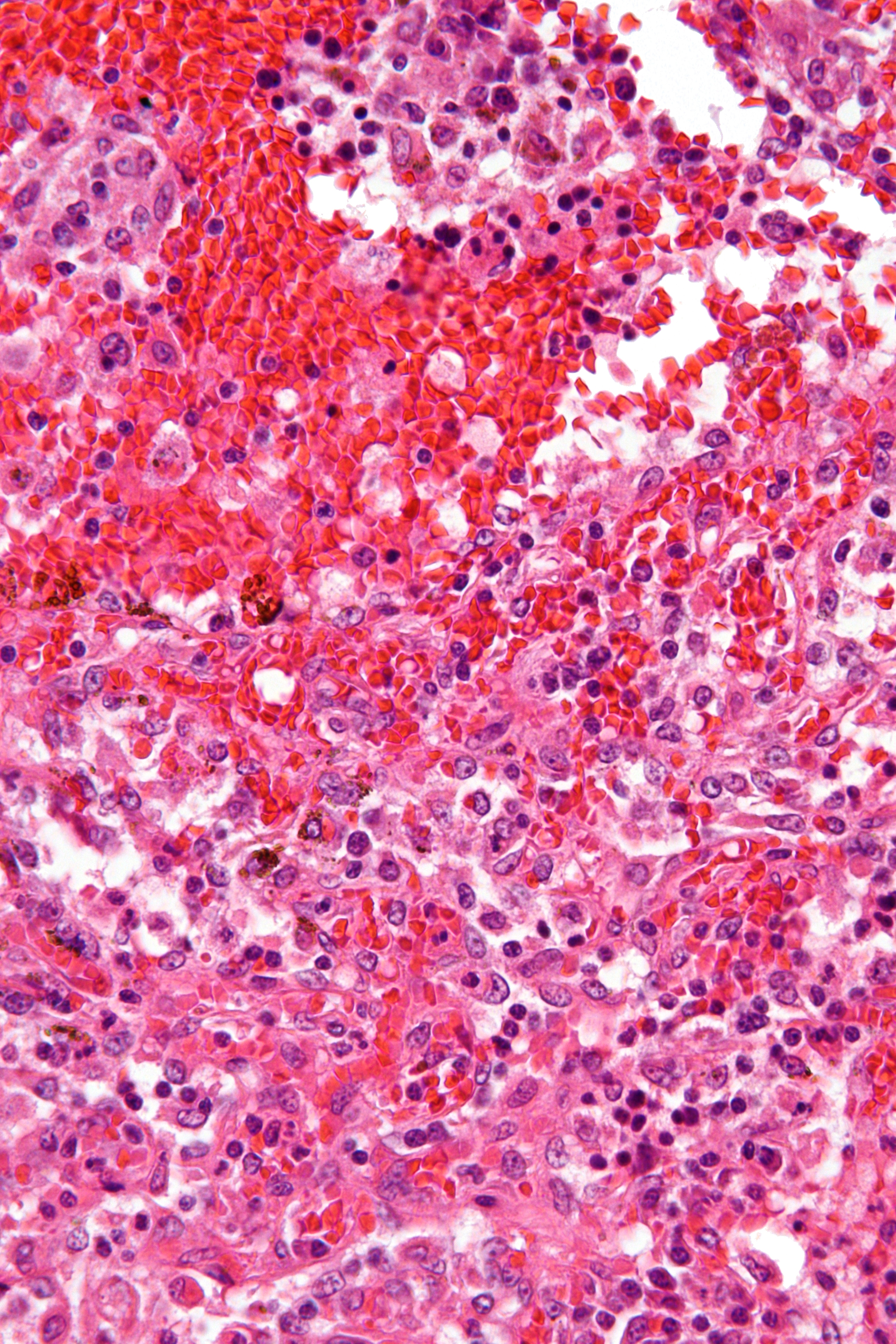
Very high mag.

== Treatment ==
The treatment for a littoral cell angioma is a splenectomy.

== See also ==
- Vascular tumor
