= Ambica Charan Mazumdar =

Indian politician

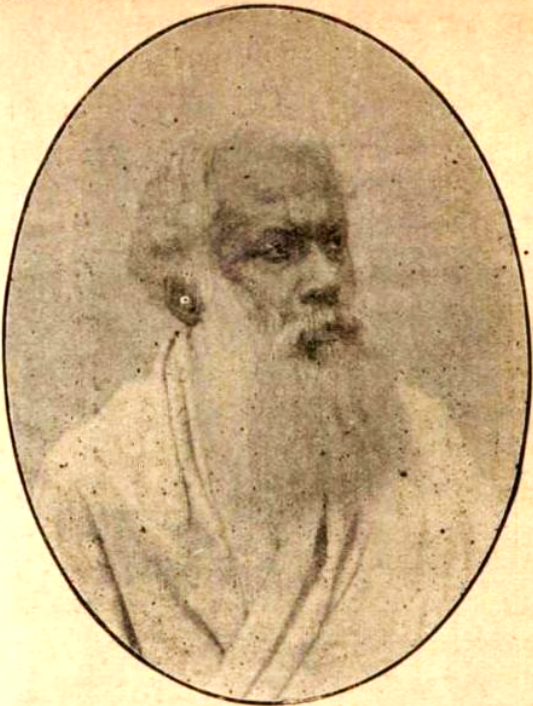

Personal details
- Born: 1850 Sandiya, Faridpur District, Bengal Presidency
- Died: 19 March 1922 (aged 71-72)
- Party: Indian National Congress (1916)

Ambica Charan Mazumdar (1850 – 19 March 1922) was an Indian Bengali politician who served as the president of the Indian National Congress.

== Early life and education ==
Born in Sandiya, a village in Bengal Presidency's Faridpur district (in present-day Bangladesh), Mazumdar graduated from the Scottish Church College as a graduating student of the University of Calcutta.

== Career ==
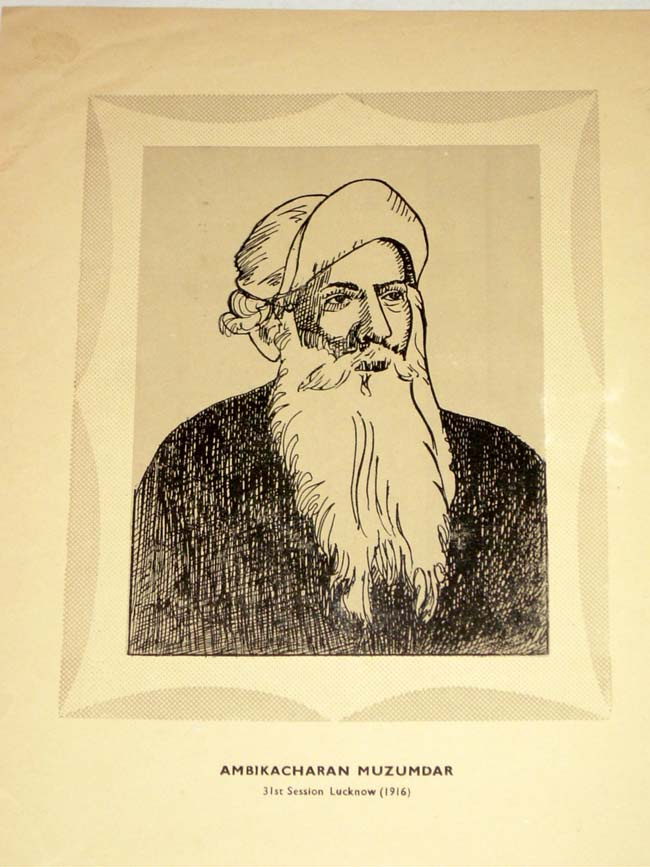

He presided over the 1899 Bengal Provincial Conference at Burdwan as well as the 1910 Conference in Calcutta. He had served as the president of the 31st session of the Indian National Congress in 1916 where the famous Lucknow Pact was signed between the Congress and the Muslim league and also moderates and extremists of the Congress party came together once again.

== Works ==
- Indian National Evolution
