= Paroxysmal cold hemoglobinuria =

Abnormal breakdown of red blood cells upon exposure to cold

- Other names: Donath-Landsteiner syndrome
- Specialty: Hematology

Paroxysmal cold hemoglobinuria (PCH) or Donath–Landsteiner hemolytic anemia (DLHA) is an autoimmune hemolytic anemia featured by complement-mediated intravascular hemolysis after cold exposure. It can present as an acute non-recurrent postinfectious event in children, or chronic relapsing episodes in adults with hematological malignancies or tertiary syphilis. Described by Julius Donath (1870–1950) and Karl Landsteiner (1868–1943) in 1904, PCH is one of the first clinical entities recognized as an autoimmune disorder.

Paroxysmal cold hemoglobinuria is a result of cold-reacting antibody immunoglobulin (Ig) induced hemolytic response inside vessels leading to anemia and, thus, a cold antibody autoimmune hemolytic anemias (CAAHA).

In most patients with DLHA, the antibody selectively targets against the red blood cells on-surface antigen called the antigen P or antigen I, respectively. Most cases were found to be owing to polyclonal IgG. Nonetheless, IgM-induced DLHA has already also been described in the past. For example, there was a case study reporting that autoimmune hemolytic anemia where an IgA Donath–Landsteiner denoted as [D-L] antibody appeared to cause Donath–Landsteiner cold hemoglobinuria. The most notable difference between DLHA and CAD (cold agglutinin disease) is the causative agent. For cold agglutinin disease, the causative agent a cold-active IgM antibody.

== Signs and symptoms ==
Pediatric patients usually present with acute onset of hemolytic anemia with fatigue, exercise intolerance, pallor, jaundice, and hemoglobinuria, preceded by exposure to cold temperature and preceding viral-like illness. This may be complicated by acute renal failure due to nephrotoxic free hemoglobin and tubular obstruction. Although the disease may be fulminant during onset, the acute form generally follows a transient, self-limiting course.

Chronic relapsing PCH manifests as episodic hemoglobinuria and anemic symptoms, usually milder than the acute form. While the classical syphilitic PCH becomes infrequent, paraneoplastic cause with underlying hematological malignancies especially in the elderly should be considered. Hepatosplenomegaly and adenomegaly are not pertinent to PCH, unless associated with underlying lymphoproliferative disorders. This form remains refractory if the underlying condition is not treated.

Signs and symptoms of DHLA is tied to an abrupt onset of hemoglobinuria subsequent to cold exposure.Exact signs and symptoms of DLHA are anemia-alike (dyspnea, palpitations, fatigue, pallor and hemolysis-alike (jaundice, dark urine and pain).Some signs and symptoms indicate a medical emergency and that the patients with DLHA require to be hospitalized:

- Rapidly progressive anemia
- Worsening anemia
- Severe anemia
- Respiratory distress
- Circulatory shock
- Renal failure
- Severe infection
- Patient's condition is unstable that produces the need to closely monitor.

== Cause ==
Infectious agents are implicated in the acute form of PCH. Viral agents include measles, mumps, Epstein-Barr virus, cytomegalovirus, varicella-zoster virus, influenza virus, and adenovirus. Non-viral agents include Mycoplasma pneumoniae and Haemophilus influenzae. Chronic relapsing PCH is classically associated with syphilis, as well as hematological malignancies including non-Hodgkin lymphoma and myeloproliferative neoplasms.DLHA can be either primary or secondary. Patients with emergent manifestation are likely deemed primary. The absolute causative agent is seldom identified.Acute Donath–Landsteiner hemolytic anemia is linked to viral infections such as:

- Adenovirus
- Congenital syphilis
- Coxsackievirus A9
- Cytomegalovirus
- Epstein–Barr virus
- Influenza A
- Measles
- Mumps
- Parvovirus
- Varicella zoster virus

Pathogens of bacterial infections that are linked to acute DLHA

- Mycoplasma pneumoniae
- Haemophilus influenzae
- Klebsiella pneumoniae
- Escherichia coli

In addition to the commonly-seen causes mentioned above, oncologic reasons may also establish. DLHA has been rarely weighted in by non-Hodgkin lymphoma, as well as oat cell carcinoma.

== Pathophysiology ==
The exact pathogenesis is not fully elucidated. The hallmark feature is the formation of polyclonal IgG autoantibody against the P antigen, which is a polysaccharide surface antigen on red blood cells in most humans. As a weak, biphasic antibody, it adsorbs on to the P antigen in the cold temperature as in the peripheral circulation in the body in the primary phase, and fixes initial components (up to C2) of the classical complement pathway. Upon recirculation to the core temperature of 37°C in the secondary phase, Anti-P autoantibody dissociates itself from the red blood cell, however, complement components remain bound and rest of the classic complement cascade proceeds till the formation of membrane attack complex (MAC) that disrupts red cell membrane resulting in intravascular hemolysis.

The causative agent of DLHA is a cold-active immunoglobulin commonly denoted as the D–L autoantibody which demonstrates bi-phasic hemolysin capability of causing serious hemolysis even when the titer detection is low, which is because of its capacity to detach itself from the lysed RBCs and consequently bind intact erythrocytes according to the temperature changes.

D-L antibodies are most commonly targeted against P antigens than I antigens and others expressed on the RBC membrane.The D-L hold on tightly to RBC surfaces during the peripheral circulation systems such as human extremities, where temperatures are likely cooler than 30 °C (86 °F) in comparison to core body temperature.After successful attachment to RBC surfaces, the D–L then activates the complement cascade, leading to RBC membrane perforation (i.e., intra-vascular hemolysis phenomenon). Complement activation and consequent hemolysis would become reality if and only if binding-RBCs has travelled to the core part of the body at a warmer temperature around 37 °C (99 °F).

Because of the reasons given above, the results of the direct antiglobulin test (DAT) with anti-C3 are highly likely to be positive while to be negative for anti-IgG or anti-IgM, only when the DAT is being performed at 4 °C (39 °F) approximately and then incubated at around 37 °C (99 °F).

== Diagnosis ==
Hemoglobinuria is not necessary for diagnosis because hemoglobinuria is sometimes absent in the case. Additionally, a history of exposure to cold temperatures is not always attained. Given the fact that hemoglobinuria as well as a personal history of exposure to cold temperatures are not always present, the diagnosis heavily relies on laboratory testing.

=== Laboratory investigations ===
The purposes of laboratory investigations are to:

1. Confirm the presence of intravascular hemolysis in terms of metabolic products of red cells and hematopoietic response.
2. Establish the diagnosis of autoimmune hemolytic anemia and differentiate from other AIHA.
3. Identify other supporting features as in hematopathological findings.

For intravascular hemolysis, the laboratory parameters include increased serum free hemoglobin, lactate dehydrogenase, unconjugated bilirubin, and reduced haptoglobin. Urine tests may show elevated hemoglobinuria and hemosiderinuria in chronic cases. Reticulocytosis may not be apparent in the acute phase or when there is viral-induced myelosuppression.

Once the clinical suspicion of autoimmune hemolytic anemia is made, direct antiglobulin test (DAT) or direct Coombs' test is the first line of investigation to confirm the presence of warm autoantibodies. Testing with polyspecific and IgG-specific antiglobulin agents is usually negative, and that with C3-specific agent may be positive. On excluding warm autoimmune hemolytic anemia (WAIHA), the cold agglutinin titer should be examined for cold agglutinin disease (CAD). The diagnosis of PCH is suspected when both WAIHA and CAD are excluded. The complement level is usually low.

Donath-Landsteiner test is the confirmatory test for PCH. It involves the cooling of the patient's serum to 4°C to allow the absorption of anti-P autoantibodies to the red cells, followed by warming to 37°C to activate complement fixation and hemolysis. Indirect DL test with addition of ABO-compatible P antigen-positive blood can be performed in case the direct DL test is negative, since the complement in the original serum may be consumed and result in false negative.

The laboratory tests comprise complete blood count and peripheral blood smear. The hematopathological findings can reflect both the presence of intravascular hemolysis and the underlying immunological process. The complete blood count usually shows normocytic anemia. Reticulocytosis may be subtle in the acute phase. Peripheral blood smear may show corresponding polychromasia. Neutrophil erythrophagocytosis is suggestive of PCH, while the absence of red cell agglutination as in CAD or microspherocytosis in WAIHA should also be noted. The laboratory test results will reveal evaluations like anisocytosis, nucleated red blood cells, poikilocytosis, polychromasia, spherocytosis, and erythrophagocytosis by neutrophils.

Blood typing is supposed to be performed with every patient even if their anemia is mild since the hemoglobin can fall all of a sudden and require prompt blood transfusion.

Anti-immunoglobulin G (anti-Ig) often disassociates itself from the surface of red blood cells under warm degrees of temperatures. Thus, the direct antiglobulin test for anti-immunoglobulin G often manifests a negative results. That's why it's important to note that the indirect antiglobulin test must be carried out in an environment at cold temperatures. According to Medscape, the so-called Donath–Landsteiner bithermic hemolytic test is an assay of hemolysis where the serum of the patient goes incubated with normal complement and red blood cells under 0 °C (32 °F) to 4 °C (39 °F) to permit the components in the initial stage of complement to be settled. Afterwards, the specimen goes incubated under 37 °C (99 °F) so that the later components of complement can then be enabled. The membrane attack complex leads the red blood cells to undergo lysis.

Blood chemistry, serology, urinalysis and suchlike may also be performed. For patients of DLHA who perform the serologic testing, summaries for syphilis, mycoplasmal infection, or viruses such as, adenovirus, cytomegalovirus, Epstein–Barr virus, influenza A, measles, mumps, and varicella might be shown positive. It's up to the underlying pathological conditions.

=== Classification ===
AIHA can be classified as warm autoimmune hemolytic anemia or cold autoimmune hemolytic anemia, which includes cold agglutinin disease and paroxysmal cold hemoglobinuria. These classifications are based on the characteristics of the autoantibodies involved in the pathogenesis of the disease. Each has a different underlying cause, management, and prognosis, making classification important when treating a patient with AIHA.

Autoimmune hemolytic anemia:

- Warm-antibody type

- Primary
- Secondary (lymphoproliferative disorders, autoimmune disorders)

- Cold-antibody type (anemia)

- Primary cold agglutinin disease
- Secondary cold agglutinin syndrome

- Associated with malignant disease
- Acute, transient, infection-associated (acute cold antibody mediated AIHA complicating Mycoplasma pneumoniae or viral infections)
- Chronic (lymphoproliferative disorders)

- Paroxysmal cold hemoglobinuria

- Idiopathic
- Secondary

- Acute, transient (Infections other than syphilis)
- Chronic (syphilis)

- Mixed cold- and warm-antibody type

- Idiopathic
- Secondary (lymphoproliferative disorders, autoimmune disorders)

- Drug-induced immune hemolytic anemia

- Autoimmune type
- Drug absorption type
- Neoantigen type

== Management ==
Acute PCH is usually transient and self-limiting. Supportive treatment includes rest, normothermia and transfusion when indicated. Intensive care for the development of acute kidney injury should be offered. Plasmapheresis is proposed to be an adjunctive measure to facilitate recovery. Steroids and other immunosuppressants are sometimes administered and the beneficial effect is uncertain. Immunotherapy is considered in refractory to corticosteroids and immunosuppression. Monoclonal antibodies e.g. rituximab (anti-CD20) and eculizumab (anti-C5) have been used but the therapeutic benefits are controversial. Antibiotic therapy should be given if syphilitic cause is confirmed, while investigations and management for hematological malignancies should be pursued in adult patients with unexplained PCH.

Patients with DLHA should be instructed to avoid exposure to cold weather, particularly if the environment is extreme cold. The risk of hemolysis associated with strenuous exercise should be told to the patients.

Patients with DLHA whose anemia is neither mild nor stable and the renal function is not practically normal generally need medical attention and treatment for DLHA.

If the patient with DLHA is in medical emergency, health care providers including hematologist should take actions to preclude the patient from developing severe anemia and/or acute renal failure. At the meanwhile, renal function and hemoglobin of the patient should be closely watched until normalized and stable.

== Prognosis ==
Most patients do not require medical intervention. Nevertheless, the rare chances of life-threatening acute drop in hemoglobin are always there and in which are deemed to develop hypovolemic shock and cardiac failure due to severe anemia, and to be complicated by acute tubular necrosis as a result of hemoglobinuria over the aftermath.

In addition to the rarely happened severe anemia and complications, prognosis of DLHA is deemed to be very good. Most patients recovered spontaneously not longer than 30 days since the disease onset.Long-term mild hemolytic anemia has been reported for several children who were in the likelihood of recurrence on exposure to any kind of cold or with illness.Case studies of those with recurrent DLHA suggest that repeated episodes of the hemolysis should not be regarded as false positive because the chances do truly exist when the patient has a D-L antibody to an antigen other than anti-P. Chronic syphilis-associated DLHA resolves when the underlying disease receives appropriate treatment.

== Epidemiology ==
Estimated incidence of PCH is 0.4 per 100000 population, and the prevalence ranges from 1.6% to 40% in patients with autoimmune hemolytic anemia. The prevalence depends on the sensitivity of the immunologic methods applied. The age of onset is often <5 years in the pediatric population, with male predominance ranging from 2.5:1 to 5:1 in male-to-female ratio.

The majority of PCH were accounted by congenital or tertiary syphilis in the early 1900s. Since the application of antibiotic therapy and prenatal screening, syphilitic PCH has become a rare entity. It is now increasingly recognized in pediatric patients with preceding viral-like illness.

Acute AIHA is uncommon. Acute DLHA occurs more in childhood than in adulthood. The D-L autoantibody is an ordinary cause of AIHA in children. It is predicted that 30–40% among all pediatric AIHA cases may have DLHA. Male-to-female ratio of the prevalence was shown as 2.1:1, meaning that DHLA is more often seen in males. No racial or ethnic difference on prevalence has been noted as of early 2019.

== History ==
In 1865, it was widely accepted as a common sense that cold exposure may result in hemoglobinuria paroxysms. After decades of devoted researches, now the elucidation of the etiology and diagnostic methods of DLHA have been learned and developed.

Discovering the D–L antibody has empowered DLHA to be differentiated from other hemoglobinuria that something other than D-L is responsible for. As of 2019, it is concluded that the existence of the Donath–Landsteiner antibody is clearly pathognomonic for the DLHA.

== See also ==
- Anemia of prematurity
- Cold agglutinin disease
- Cold sensitive antibody
- Fanconi anemia
- Hemolytic anemia
- List of hematologic conditions
