= Cold autoimmune hemolytic anemia =

- Specialty: Hematology

Cold autoimmune hemolytic anemia caused by cold-reacting antibodies. Autoantibodies that bind to the erythrocyte membrane leading to premature erythrocyte destruction (hemolysis) characterize autoimmune hemolytic anemia.

== Presentation ==
A common complaint among patients with cold agglutinin disease is painful fingers and toes with purplish discoloration associated with cold exposure. In chronic cold agglutinin disease, the patient is more symptomatic during the colder months.

Cold agglutinin-mediated acrocyanosis differs from Raynaud phenomenon. In Raynaud phenomena, caused by vasospasm, a triphasic color change occurs, from white to blue to red, based on vasculature response. No evidence of such a response exists in cold agglutinin disease.

Other symptoms

- Respiratory symptoms: May be present in patients with M pneumoniae infection.
- Hemoglobinuria (the passage of dark urine that contains hemoglobin), A rare symptom that results from hemolysis, this may be reported following prolonged exposure to cold, hemoglobinuria is more commonly seen in paroxysmal cold hemoglobinuria.
- Chronic fatigue, Due to anemia.

== Causes ==
Cold agglutinins develop in more than 60% of patients with infectious mononucleosis, but hemolytic anemia is rare.

Classic chronic cold agglutinin disease is idiopathic, associated with symptoms and signs in relation to cold exposure.

Causes of the monoclonal secondary disease include the following:

- B-cell neoplasms - Waldenström macroglobulinemia, lymphoma, chronic lymphoid leukemia, myeloma
- Non hematologic neoplasms

Causes of polyclonal secondary cold agglutinin disease include the following:

- Mycoplasma infections.
- Viral infections: Infectious mononucleosis due to Epstein-Barr virus (EBV) or CMV, Mumps, varicella, rubella, adenovirus, HIV, influenza, hepatitis C.
- Bacterial infections: Legionnaire disease, syphilis, listeriosis and Escherichia coli.
- Parasitic infections: Malaria and trypanosomiasis.
- Trisomy and translocation: Cytogenetic studies in patients with cold agglutinin disease have revealed the presence of trisomy 3 and trisomy 12. Translocation (8;22) has also been reported in association with cold agglutinin disease.
- Transplantation: Cold agglutinin–mediated hemolytic anemia has been described in patients after living-donor liver transplantation treated with tacrolimus and after bone marrow transplantation with cyclosporine treatments. It is postulated that such calcineurin inhibitors, which selectively affect T-cell function and spare B-lymphocytes, may interfere with the deletion of autoreactive T-cell clones, resulting in autoimmune disease.
- Systemic sclerosis: Cold agglutinin disease has been described in patients with sclerodermic features, with the degree of anemia being associated with increasing disease activity of the patient's systemic sclerosis. This may suggest a close association between systemic rheumatic disease and autoimmune hematologic abnormalities.
- Hyperreactive malarial splenomegaly: Hyperreactive malarial splenomegaly (HMS) is an immunopathologic complication of recurrent malarial infection. Patients with HMS develop splenomegaly, acquired clinical immunity to malaria, high serum concentrations of anti-Plasmodium antibodies, and high titers of IgM, with a complement-fixing IgM that acts as a cold agglutinin.
- DPT vaccination: Diphtheria-pertussis-tetanus (DPT) vaccination has been implicated in the development of autoimmune hemolytic anemia caused by IgM autoantibody with a high thermal range. A total of 6 cases have been reported; 2 followed the initial vaccination and 4 followed the second or third vaccinations.
- Other: Equestrian perniosis is a rare cause of persistent elevated titers of cold agglutinins. Also rarely, the first manifestations of cold agglutinin disease can develop when a patient is subjected to hypothermia for cardiopulmonary bypass surgery.

== Pathophysiology ==
Cold agglutinins, or cold autoantibodies, occur naturally in nearly all individuals. These natural cold autoantibodies occur at low titers, less than 1:64 measured at 4 °C, and have no activity at higher temperatures. Pathologic cold agglutinins occur at titers over 1:1000 and react at 28-31 °C and sometimes at 37 °C.

Cold agglutinin disease usually results from the production of a specific IgM antibody directed against the I/i antigens (precursors of the ABH and Lewis blood group substances) on red blood cells (RBCs). Cold agglutinins commonly have variable heavy-chain regions encoded by VH, with a distinct idiotype identified by the 9G4 rat murine monoclonal antibody.

== Diagnosis ==
=== Classification ===
AIHA can be classified as warm autoimmune hemolytic anemia or cold autoimmune hemolytic anemia, which includes cold agglutinin disease and paroxysmal cold hemoglobinuria. These classifications are based on the characteristics of the autoantibodies involved in the pathogenesis of the disease. Each has a different underlying cause, management, and prognosis, making classification important when treating a patient with AIHA.

Autoimmune hemolytic anemia

- Warm-antibody type

- Primary
- Secondary (lymphoproliferative disorders, autoimmune disorders)

- Cold-antibody type (anemia)

- Primary cold agglutinin disease
- Secondary cold agglutinin syndrome

- Associated with malignant disease
- Acute, transient, infection-associated (acute cold antibody mediated AIHA complicating Mycoplasma pneumoniae or viral infections)
- Chronic (lymphoproliferative disorders)

- Paroxysmal cold hemoglobinuria

- Idiopathic
- Secondary

- Acute, transient (Infections other than syphilis)
- Chronic (syphilis)

- Mixed cold- and warm-antibody type

- Idiopathic
- Secondary (lymphoproliferative disorders, autoimmune disorders)

- Drug-induced immune hemolytic anemia

- Autoimmune type
- Drug absorption type
- Neoantigen type

== Treatment ==
Cold agglutinin disease may be managed successfully using protective measures (clothing) alone in most cases. Special protective clothing is sometimes necessary in extreme cases. Therapy is directed at serious symptoms and the underlying disorder, if any is found.

Keep in mind that the idiopathic variety of cold agglutinin disease is generally a benign disorder with prolonged survival and spontaneous exacerbations and remissions in the course of the disease. Acute post infectious syndromes usually resolve spontaneously. Anemia is generally mild. Only patients who have serious symptoms related to anemia or have a Raynaud type syndrome that constitutes a threat to life or quality of life require active therapy. The presence of an associated malignancy requires specific therapy.

Cold agglutinin disease is so uncommon in children that no specific recommendations for therapy are available. Intravenous immunoglobulin (IVIG) was used successfully in an infant with IgA-associated autoimmune hemolytic anemia.

=== Splenectomy ===
Splenectomy is usually ineffective for the treatment of cold agglutinin disease because the liver is the predominant site of sequestration. However, if the patient has splenomegaly, then the disease may respond to splenectomy. More importantly, a lymphoma localized to the spleen may only be found after splenectomy.

=== Diet and activity ===
Patients with cold agglutinin disease should include good sources of folic acid, such as fresh fruits and vegetables, in their diet. Activities for these individuals should be less strenuous than those for healthy people, particularly for patients with anemia. Jogging in the cold could be very hazardous because of the added windchill factor.

=== Consultations ===
A hematologist-oncologist working in collaboration with a blood banker is helpful in complicated cases of cold agglutinin disease. Careful planning and coordination with multiple personnel are needed if patients are to undergo a procedure during which their body temperature could fall.
