= Autoimmune hemolytic anemia =

Blood disorder in which antibodies target red blood cells

- Other names: Autoimmune haemolytic anaemia
- Specialty: Hematology
- Frequency: 0.03%

Autoimmune hemolytic anemia (AIHA) occurs when a person's immune system produces antibodies directed against their own red blood cells (RBCs). These antibodies attach to red cells, causing them to break down (lyse), and reducing the number of oxygen-carrying red blood cells in circulation (anemia). The antibodies are usually directed against common red cell antigens, therefore they also bind to allogenic or transfused red cells and cause them to lyse. (ref). Autoimmune haemolytic anaemia can be caused by different types of antibodies with reactivity at different temperatures. The one caused by IgG antibodies is called warm-immune haemolytic anaemia and has an incidence of 5-10 cases per million whereas 'cold agglutinin disease' is caused by IgM antibodies with an incidence of 1-1.8 cases per million.

The terminology used in this disease is somewhat ambiguous. Although MeSH uses the term "autoimmune hemolytic anemia", some sources prefer the term "immunohemolytic anemia" so drug reactions can be included in this category. The National Cancer Institute considers "immunohemolytic anemia", "autoimmune hemolytic anemia", and "immune complex hemolytic anemia" to all be synonyms.

A hemolytic state exists whenever the red cell survival time is shortened from the normal average of 120 days. Hemolytic anemia is the hemolytic state in which anemia is present, and bone marrow function is inferentially unable to compensate for the shortened lifespan of the red cell. Immune hemolytic states are those, both anemic and nonanemic, which involve immune mechanisms consisting of antigen-antibody reactions. These reactions may result from unrelated antigen-antibody complexes that fix to an innocent-bystander erythrocyte, or from related antigen-antibody combinations in which the host red cell or some part of its structure is or has become antigenic. The latter type of antigen-antibody reaction may be termed "autoimmune", and hemolytic anemias so produced are autoimmune hemolytic anemias.

== Signs and symptoms ==
Symptoms of AIHA may be due to the underlying anemia; including shortness of breath or dyspnea, fatigue, headache, muscle weakness and pallor.Jaundice is a common sign of haemolytic anemia. It is caused by the accumulation of bilirubin in skin, and sclera. Bilirubin is produced by degradation of heme molecule and as red cells lyse and release intracellular contents, the free heme decomposes to bilirubin causing jaundice. Jaundice can also be accompanied by dark (tea coloured) urine due to free hemoblogin.

In cold agglutinin disease (cold antibody type), agglutination and impaired passage of red blood cells through capillaries in the extremities causes acrocyanosis and Raynaud phenomenon with a rare complication of gangreneSpherocytes are found in immunologically mediated hemolytic anemias. Signs of hemolysis that are present in AIHA include low hemoglobin (blood count), alterations in levels of cell markers of hemolysis; including elevated lactate dehydrogenase (LDH), decreased haptoglobin and elevated unconjugated bilirubin. Reticulocytosis, or an increase in circulating immature red blood cells, may be seen.

== Causes ==
The causes of AIHA are poorly understood. The disease may be primary, or secondary to another underlying illness. The primary AIHA is idiopathic (the two terms used synonymously) and accounts for more than 60% of unselected cases.

Secondary AIHA can result from many other illnesses usually the ones that also affect immune system. The most common causes of secondary AIHA include lymphoproliferative disorders (e.g., chronic lymphocytic leukemia, lymphoma), immune dysregulation disorders such as autoimmune lymphoproliferative syndrome (ALPS) and common variable immunodeficiency (CVID) and other autoimmune disorders (e.g., systemic lupus erythematosus, rheumatoid arthritis, scleroderma, Crohn's disease, ulcerative colitis), infections (as HIV, EBV, hepatitis, mycoplasma, viral pneumonia, and other respiratory infections) and drugs. Less common causes of warm-type AIHA include neoplasms other than lymphoid, and bone marrow / solid organ transplant. Secondary warm type AIHA has been observed in cases of COVID-19. Secondary cold type AIHA is also caused primarily by lymphoproliferative disorders but is also commonly caused by infection, especially by mycoplasma, viral pneumonia, infectious mononucleosis, and other respiratory infections. Less commonly, it can be caused by concomitant autoimmune disorders.

Drug-induced AIHA, though rare, can be caused by a number of drugs. More than 130 drugs have been implicated in causing AIHA.This is a type II immune response in which the drug binds to macromolecules on the surface of the RBCs and acts as an antigen. Antibodies are produced against the RBCs, which leads to complement activation. Complement fragments, such as C3a, C4a and C5a, activate granular leukocytes (e.g., neutrophils), while other components of the system (C6, C7, C8, C9) either can form the membrane attack complex (MAC) or can bind the antibody, aiding phagocytosis by macrophages (C3b). This is one type of "penicillin allergy".

In about half of cases, the cause of autoimmune hemolytic anemia cannot be determined (idiopathic or primary). This condition can also be caused by or occur with another disorder (secondary) or rarely, occur following the use of certain drugs (such as penicillin) or after a person has a blood and marrow stem cell transplant.Secondary causes of autoimmune hemolytic anemia include:

- Autoimmune diseases, such as lupus
- Chronic lymphocytic leukemia
- Non-Hodgkin's lymphoma and other blood cancers
- Epstein-Barr virus
- Cytomegalovirus
- Mycoplasma pneumonia
- Hepatitis
- HIV

== Pathophysiology ==
AIHA can be caused by different antibody classes with IgG and IgM antibodies being the primary antibody types. IgA autoantibodies can also rarely cause AIHA.

Pathophysiology of warm or IgG mediated AIHA differs from cold or IgM mediated AIHA. Warm AIHA means immune haemolysis is caused by auto-antibodies which bind to red cells at body temperature (37 degree Celsius). These are usually IgG but can be IgM in rare cases. In warm AIHA, red cells coated by IgG undergo antibody mediated cell death in the reticuloendothelial system of liver and spleen leading to extravascular haemolysis. These IgG antibodies are also capable of activating the complement cascade with variable efficacy, further leading to opsonisation and destruction of red cells in reticuloendothelial system (RE) system or intravascular haemolysis via terminal complement.

Red cell autoantibodies causing cold agglutinin disease are of IgM class. These bind to RBC antigens at lower temperatures (e.g. in the acral parts of body such as hands, feet, ears, nose). The antibody/RBC antigen complex then activates the classical complement pathway leading to complement mediated hemolysis of RBCs in RE system.Rarely, a biphasic IgG antibody leads to complement mediated intravascular lysis. This antibody binds to red cells in acral regions along with first two components of complement. As the blood moves to central regions of the body and warms up, the IgG dissociates but the complement remains attached to red cell causing intravascular hemolysis. The antibody causing this biphasic hemolysis is commonly IgG but IgM and IgA have also been reported.Paroxysmal Cold Hemoglobinuria (PCH) is primarily a pediatric disease and usually occurs with Mycoplasma pneumonia infection or other viral infections. It can also occur with chronic lymphocytic leukemia and lymphomas in adults.

Pathophysiologic mechanisms involved in drug induced haemolysis include: drug-dependent autoantibodies due to an immuno-allergic mechanism, drug-independent autoantibodies due to molecular mimicry, or nonspecific stimulation of the immune system.

AIHA cannot be attributed to any single autoantibody. To determine the autoantibody or autoantibodies present in a patient, the Coombs test, also known as the antiglobulin test, is performed. There are two types of Coombs tests, direct and indirect; more commonly, the direct antiglobulin test (DAT) is used. Classification of the antibodies is based on their activity at different temperatures and their etiology. Antibodies with high activity at physiological temperature (approximately 37 °C) are termed warm autoantibodies. Cold autoantibodies act best at temperatures of 0–4 °C. Patients with cold-type AIHA, therefore, have higher disease activity when body temperature falls into a hypothermic state. Usually, the antibody becomes active when it reaches the limbs, at which point it opsonizes RBCs. When these RBCs return to central regions, they are damaged by complement. Patients may present with one or both types of autoantibodies; if both are present, the disease is termed "mixed-type" AIHA.

When DAT is performed, the typical presentations of AIHA are as follows. Warm-type AIHA shows a positive reaction with antisera to IgG antibodies with or without complement activation. Cases may also arise with complement alone or with IgA, IgM or a combination of these three antibody classes and complement. Cold-type AIHA usually reacts with antisera to complement and occasionally to the above antibodies. This is the case in both cold agglutinin disease and cold paroxysmal hematuria. In general, mixed warm and cold AIHA shows a positive reaction to IgG and complement, sometimes IgG alone, and sometimes complement alone. Mixed-type can, like the others, present unusually with positive reactions to other antisera.

== Diagnosis ==
Diagnosis of AIHA should be suspected in a patient presenting with acute onset of anemia. It is essential to consider the secondary causes of AIHA such as infections, lymphoproliferative conditions, drugs, immune dysregulation and autoimmune conditions. Laboratory investigations are performed to determine the aetiology of the anemia. These include complete blood count, reticulocyte count, markers of hemolysis (haptoglobin, LDH and bilirubin) and red cell morphology on peripheral smear.

The diagnosis of AIHA is confirmed by the direct antiglobulin test (DAT), also known as the Coombs test, which determines the presence of IgG or IgM antibodies attached to the surface of red blood cells. The test involves the incubation of red blood cells with antiglobulin reagent at 37 °C (99 °F). If positive, further testing is undertaken to determine whether the hemolysis is IgM/complement-mediated or IgG-mediated.A bone-marrow biopsy can be performed to identify a possible underlying lymphoproliferative disorder.

=== Classification ===
AIHA can be classified as warm autoimmune hemolytic anemia or cold autoimmune hemolytic anemia, which includes cold agglutinin disease and paroxysmal cold hemoglobinuria. These classifications are based on the characteristics of the autoantibodies involved in the pathogenesis of the disease. Each has a different underlying cause, management, and prognosis, making classification important when treating a patient with AIHA.

Autoimmune hemolytic anemia

- Warm AIHA (IgG mediated)

- Primary (No underlying secondary cause)
- Secondary (lymphoproliferative disorders, autoimmune disorders, stem cell transplant, infections, immune dysregulation, drugs)

- Cold AIHA

- Primary cold agglutinin disease
- Secondary cold agglutinin syndrome

- Associated with malignant disease
- Acute, transient, infection-associated (acute cold antibody mediated AIHA complicating Mycoplasma pneumoniae or viral infections)
- Chronic (lymphoproliferative disorders)

- Paroxysmal cold hemoglobinuria

- Idiopathic
- Secondary

- Acute, transient (Infections other than syphilis)
- Chronic (syphilis)

- Mixed cold- and warm-antibody type

- Idiopathic
- Secondary (lymphoproliferative disorders, autoimmune disorders)

- Drug-induced immune hemolytic anemia

- Autoimmune type
- Drug absorption type
- Neoantigen type

=== Evidence for hemolysis ===
The following findings may be present:

- Increased red cell breakdown
  - Elevated serum bilirubin (unconjugated)
  - Excess urinary urobilinogen
  - Reduced plasma haptoglobin
  - Raised serum lactic dehydrogenase (LDH)
  - Hemosiderinuria
  - Methemalbuminemia
  - Spherocytosis
- Increased red cell production:
  - Reticulocytosis
  - Erythroid hyperplasia of the bone marrow

Specific investigations

- Positive direct Coombs test

== Treatment ==
Steroids are the first line treatment in warm AIHA; with oral prednisone achieving an 80% initial response rate, with a 30-40% sustained remission rate at 1 year. Steroids may be decreased at 3 weeks and tapered at 3–6 months depending on the response. Rituximab may be added to initial management to increase the response rate, or it may be used in cases of severe disease such as IgA mediated warm AIHA, mixed AIHA, Evans syndrome or in cases of high hemolysis levels). If a response cannot be achieved with steroids or rituximab, other third line options are considered which include azathioprine, cyclophosphamide, cyclosporine, mycophenolate mofetil, sirolimus and bortezomib. The treatments for secondary warm AIHA are generally the same as primary warm AIHA, but with the addition of treating the underlying disease if possible. Splenectomy can be considered for refractory disease.

Steroids are not indicated in the treatment of cold agglutinin disease due to low response rates. Cases of cold agglutinin disease with mild anemia with limited and compensated hemolysis can be monitored with adjunct supportive care (such as avoidance of cold exposure or thermal protection to prevent against hemolysis). Rituximab is used to treat pathogenic B-cell clones in cold agglutinin disease with response rates of 45-60%. Relapses are common upon discontinuation of rituximab, but the medication can be restarted to achieve subsequent remission. Rituximab can be combined with bendamustine to achieve a 71% overall and 40% complete response rate with an increased response seen with prolonged therapy (with a time to best response at a median of 30 months) due to the drugs' effect on long lived plasma cells. Splenectomy is less efficacious in cold agglutinin disease.Special considerations are required when treating people with AIHA using blood transfusion. In cold agglutinin disease and PCH; the patient and the extremity should be kept warm during transfusion to prevent agglutination and hemolysis of the donor and patient red blood cells. In warm AIHA; cross-matching of blood will show incompatibility so it is recommended to perform a bedside in vivo compatibility test prior to infusion. Erythropoietin (EPO) has been shown to increase hemoglobin levels in cold and warm AIHA.

== History ==
"Blood-induced icterus" produced by the release of massive amounts of a coloring material from blood cells followed by the formation of bile was recognized and described by Vanlair and Voltaire Masius' in 1871. About 20 years later, Hayem distinguished between congenital hemolytic anemia and an acquired type of infectious icterus associated with chronic splenomegaly. In 1904, Donath and Landsteiner suggested a serum factor was responsible for hemolysis in paroxysmal cold hemoglobinuria. French investigators led by Chauffard stressed the importance of red-cell autoagglutination in patients with acquired hemolytic anemia. In 1930, Lederer and Brill described cases of acute hemolysis with rapid onset of anemia and rapid recovery after transfusion therapy. These hemolytic episodes were thought to be due to infectious agents. A clear distinction between congenital and acquired hemolytic anemia was not drawn, however, until Dameshek and Schwartz in 1938, and, in 1940, they demonstrated the presence of abnormal hemolysins in the sera of patients with acquired hemolytic anemia and postulated an immune mechanism.

During the past three decades, studies defining red-cell blood groups and serum antibodies have produced diagnostic methods that have laid the basis for immunologic concepts relevant to many of the acquired hemolytic states. Of these developments, the antiglobulin test described by Coombs, Mourant, and Race in 1945 has proved to be one of the more important, useful tools now available for the detection of immune hemolytic states. This technique demonstrated that a rabbit antibody against human globulin would induce agglutination of human red cells "coated with an incomplete variety of rhesus antibodies". C. Moreschlit had used the same method in 1908 in a goat antirabbit-red-cell system. The test was premature and was forgotten. In 1946, Boorman, Dodd, and Loutit applied the direct antiglobulin test to a variety of hemolytic anemias, and laid the foundation for the clear distinction of autoimmune from congenital hemolytic anemia.

== In children ==
In general, AIHA in children has a good prognosis and is self-limiting. However, if it presents within the first two years of life or in the teenage years, the disease often follows a more chronic course, requiring long-term immunosuppression, with serious developmental consequences. The aim of therapy may sometimes be to lower the use of steroids in the control of the disease. In this case, splenectomy may be considered, as well as other immunosuppressive drugs. Infection is a serious concern in patients on long-term immunosuppressant therapy, especially in very young children (less than two years).

== See also ==
- Hematology
- Hemolytic anemia
- List of circulatory system conditions
- List of hematologic conditions
- Splenomegaly
