= Red cell agglutination =

Clumping of red blood cells

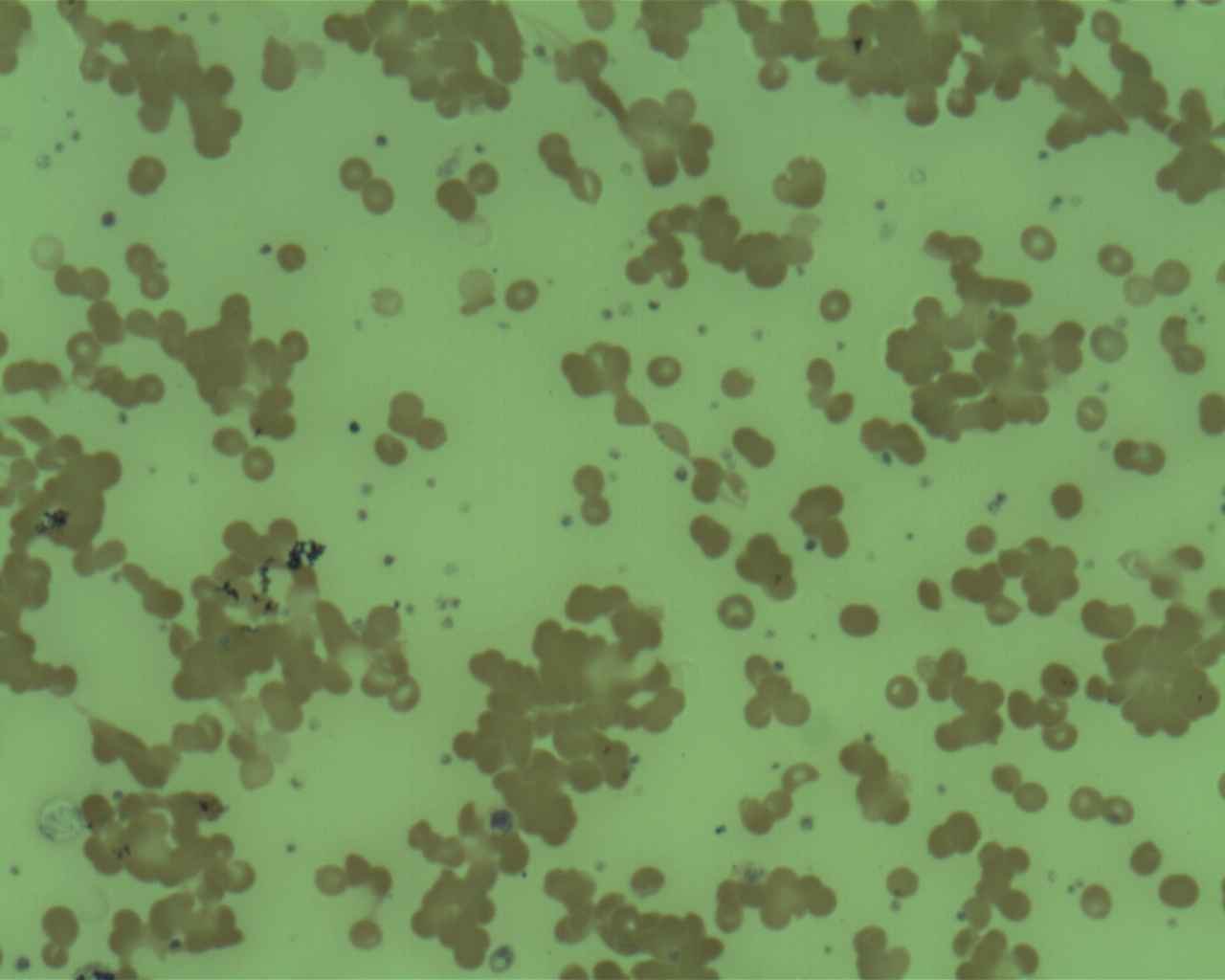
Red cell agglutination in a patient with cold agglutinin disease.

In hematology, red cell agglutination or autoagglutination is a phenomenon in which red blood cells clump together, forming aggregates. It is caused by the surface of the red cells being coated with antibodies. This often occurs in cold agglutinin disease, a type of autoimmune hemolytic anemia in which people produce antibodies (termed cold agglutinins) that bind to their red blood cells at cold temperatures and destroy them. People may develop cold agglutinins from lymphoproliferative disorders, from infection with Mycoplasma pneumoniae or Epstein–Barr virus, or idiopathically (without any apparent cause). Red cell agglutination can also occur in paroxysmal nocturnal hemoglobinuria and warm autoimmune hemolytic anemia. In cases of red cell agglutination, the direct antiglobulin test can be used to demonstrate the presence of antibodies bound to the red cells.

== Interference with laboratory tests ==
Red blood cell aggregates are counted as single cells by the automated analyzers used to run complete blood count tests. This leads to a markedly decreased red blood cell count and hematocrit and markedly elevated mean cell volume and mean cell hemoglobin concentration. Red cell agglutination also interferes with routine methods for blood typing and blood compatibility testing, which rely on agglutination reactions. People with red cell agglutination may exhibit spontaneous agglutination reactions during testing, leading to a false positive result. If the causative antibodies are only active at room temperature, the agglutination can be reversed by heating the blood sample to 37 °C (99 °F). People with warm autoimmune hemolytic anemia may exhibit red cell agglutination that does not resolve on warming.
