= Exertional hemoglobinuria =

Exertional hemoglobinuria (or exercise hematuria) may refer to:

- March hemoglobinuria caused by impacts upon the body
- Hemoglobinuria secondary to athletic nephritis
