= B cell growth and differentiation factors =

Two important groups of soluble factors

B Cell Growth and Differentiation Factors (also known as BCGF and BCDF) are two important groups of soluble factors controlling the life cycle of B cells (also referred to as B lymphocytes, cells which perform functions including: antibody secretion, antigen presentation, preservation of memory for antigens, and lymphokine secretion). BCGFs specifically mediate the growth and division of B cells, or, in other words, the progression of B cells through their life cycle (cell cycle stages G1, S, G2). BCDFs control the advancement of a B cell progenitor or unmatured B cell to an adult immunoglobulin (Ig) secreting cell. Differentiation factors control cell fate and can sometimes cause matured cells to change lineage. Not all currently known BCGFs and BCDFs affect all B cell lineages and stages of the cell cycle in similar ways. Both BCGFs and BCDFs work on cells previously "activated" by factors such as anti-immunoglobulin (anti-Ig). BCGFs cause activated B cells to enlarge, express activation markers (ex. transferrin receptor) and enter the S phase (DNA synthesis phase) of the cell cycle. Meanwhile, BCDFs stimulate these cells to differentiate to mature Ig-secreting B cells.

An important note is that B cell Proliferation Factors (BCPFs) also exist and are different from BCGFs. BCPFs make cells, which are not necessarily activated, more responsive to BCGFs and help maintain cell viability, whereas BCGFs direct and stimulate growth and division. This article will mention BCPFs and factors that induce proliferation, yet the main focus will remain on BCGFs and BCDFs.

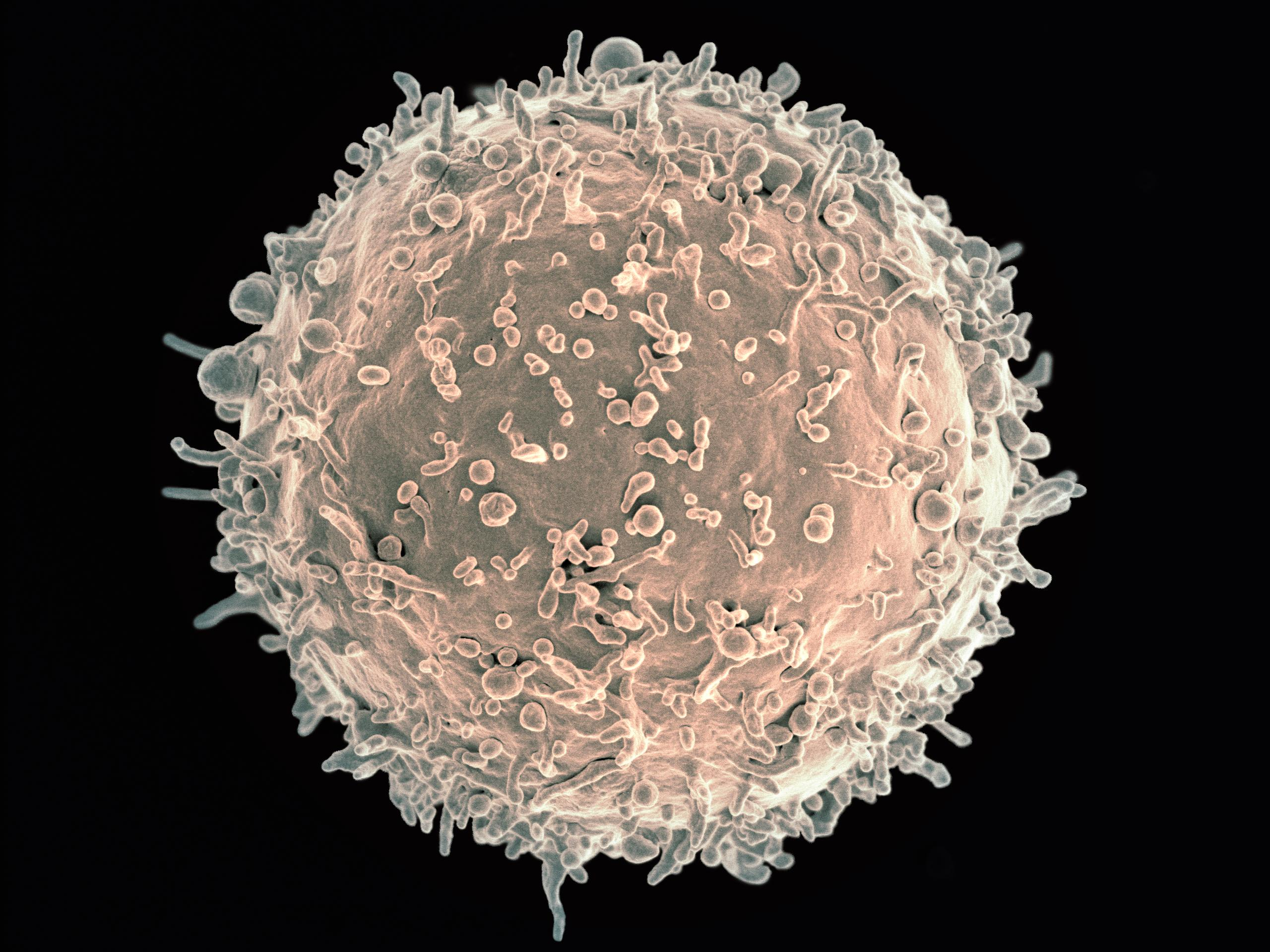
Human B Lymphocyte

== General Overview ==
The currently known BCGFs and BCDFs are BCGF I (also called B cell Stimulating Factor 1 (BSF1)), BCGF II, BCDF, IL-1 (interleukin-1), IL-2, IL-3, IL-4, IL-5, IL-6 (BSF-2), IFN-alpha, beta 2, and gamma, neuroleukin, TGF-beta (Transforming Growth Factor-beta), LP1 (Lymphopoetin 1), BCGFLOW, TNF-alpha (Tumor Necrosis Factor alpha), TRF (T cell Replacing Factor), CSF (colony-stimulating factors), MAF (macrophage activation factors), and lymphotoxin. Most factors act in many points throughout the B cell lifecycle, activation, growth, differentiation, and maturation, making this a complex pathway for study. Provided here is a list of these with some more detailed descriptions about their origins and functions.

BCGF I (BSF1 or BSFp1) - secreted by activated T cells. BCGF I induces "resting" cells to become susceptible to stimulation by ligands. Both anti-Ig and BCGF I are required for a cell to enter S and G2 phase. It is not clear if BCGF I acts on memory B cells specifically, but it appears to induce growth in the continuous presence of anti-Ig in all other lineages. BCGF is uninhibited by anti-Tac (T cell activation antigen), whereas other factors, such as IL-2 are.

BCGF II - a cytokine secreted by T cells.

BCDF - causes calcium influx in cells, critical for differentiation. It is the only factor which can achieve this effect. Induces differentiation in late-stage activated cells. BCDF subclasses are associated with the secretion of specific subclasses of Ig, for example BCDF(γ) with IgG and BCDF(μ) with IgM.

IL-1 - a cytokine derived from macrophages, this factor drives cells into S phase, usually working after BCGF I. IL-1 weakly co-stimulates even resting B cells in the presence of anti-Ig and can enhance BCDF function.

IL-2 - a cytokine key activating factor for T cells and B cells secreted by T cells. Cells in early-stage activation differentiate in response to IL-2 and all B cells proliferate in the presence of IL-2. IL-2 exhibits an additive affect to BCGF when both are present. Yet the magnitude of its effect is much less than BCGF and BCDF in both growth and differentiation.

IL-3 - cytokine associated with the differentiation of more mature B cells.

IL-4 - cytokine associated with the differentiation of mature T cells, which some B cell precursors are also responsive to.

IL-5 - cytokine that acts like IL-6, except it can also induce proliferation in B cells, and its effect on differentiation is partially inhibited by IL-4. IL-5 cannot induce differentiation in cells activated by anti-Ig.

IL-6 (BSF-2) - cytokine that acts exclusively as a B cell differentiation factor, stimulating increase in levels of Ig, J-chain mRNA, and proteins.

IFN-alpha, beta 2, and gamma (interferons alpha, beta 2, and gamma) - IFN-gamma in combination with IL-2 also induces early-stage differentiation. Interferon-gamma has previously been reported as a requirement for plaque-forming cell response. Interferon-alpha can either enhance or suppress differentiation by controlling responsiveness of human peripheral blood B cells to B-cell helper factors, depending on certain environment and context-specific conditions, as its signaling is likely mediated by other cell types.

Neuroleukin

TGF-beta

LP1 - a growth factor active in the development of immature B cells and capable of stimulating proliferation of B cell precursors.

BCGFLOW

TNF-alpha

TRF - induced primarily IgM secretion from B cells, thus constituting a differentiation factor. Various sources disagree as to whether TRF can induce proliferation.

CSF

MAF

Lymphotoxin

== Discovery ==
The identification and classification of B cell growth and differentiation factors was primarily conducted in the 1980s-1990s, though it had begun to spark interest of the scientific community in the 1970s. It began with the creation of T cell hybridomas - immortal cells that could be selected to produce only one factor. This allowed the study of B cells exposed to only one soluble factor at a time, enabling the identification of that factor's direct effects on the cells. Previously, it was believed that B cell growth was induced exclusively by the presence of antigen. Some major questions that researchers attempted to answer were which cells and specifically cell types secreted these factors, and in which conditions, as well as if and how these factors differed from T Cell Growth and Differentiation Factors (TCGFs and TCDFs) such as IL-2. Additionally, it was established early on that several compounds could mediate B cell growth and differentiation, some of them working only when encountered together (synergistically). So, researchers also attempted to identify how many BCGFs and BCDFs exist and classify the varieties of these factors.

A major early challenge was the inability of culturing one distinctive T cell line or the isolation of thereof to analyze its effects. T cell factors that induced B cell activation, proliferation, growth, and differentiation were frequently generated by mixed populations of T cells. When the first immortalized T cell lines began to emerge, it became possible to observe which T cells had specific effects on B cells. Various T cell types secreted factors that induced Ig production, in some cases only of specific kinds or only in the presence of antigen. Some IgG classes secreted by B cells are exclusively T cell dependent.

Another major advance was the declaration that BCGF and BCDF were indeed two different entities. It was determined that T cell secreted factors and anti-Ig were necessary for the proliferation of activated B cells, while the addition of a differentiation factor was required to induce Ig production (ie. differentiation). So, it was determined that these two factors were separate entities. Isolating the two types of BCGF and BCDF was difficult as it required purification from IL-2. A key difference between the two variants of BCGF was that only one could induce growth in colony-forming B cells.

Later, difficulties with the subject B cell populations began to emerge, as there wasn't yet a stable long-term method of culture or isolation of individual subtypes. The difficulty of obtaining populations of viable B cell precursors was resolved by the design of a long-term bone marrow culture system, which secreted LP1 growth factor. In given populations, it was determined that B cells could be sorted into groups of "activated" and "resting" cells by their size, enabling the study of factors on these two distinct subgroups. As not all cell lines responded to the factors listed in the above section in similar ways (and some were completely irresponsive), a model cell line that could respond to various factors was necessary to compare the resulting responses and study in more detail the pathways of each lymphokine or factor's signal. Researchers identified several such cell lines that were guaranteed to have receptors for or respond to groups of factors. For example, in CH12 B cell lymphoma, cells differentiate in response to both IL-5 and IL-6 in the presence of other costimulatory cytokines, while in other cell lines IL-5 is only effective in a narrow window of time right after activation.

BCGFs and BCDFs were originally sought after for research purposes. Previously identified similar factors for T cells allowed T cells to be "immortalized" or kept alive in the research setting for prolonged periods of time. This permitted the extensive study of T cells and their functioning. It also permitted the modelling of the immune response, such as studying the activated T cell state. Finding factors that would enable a similar closer study of B cells would greatly benefit science.

== B cell differentiation pathways ==
The most common simplified overview description of the B cell differentiation pathway involves the following steps: an antigen interacts with the corresponding surface membrane immunoglobulin after which the B cell begins expressing receptors for growth factors secreted by T cells (BCGFs and IL-2), after these factors bind, the lymphocytes enter S phase, and subsequent binding with BCDFs differentiates B cells into Ig secreting cells. This model quickly grows more complex as individual resting B cells receive multiple varying sequential signals that determine future cell fate and functions that will be performed by those cells. Depending on this sequence of BCDFs, B cells may achieve different "fates" which can constitute the types of Ig they secrete or even their destiny with a specialized lineage (such as Memory B cells or plasma cells).

Further investigations have been conducted since the identification of BCGFs and BCDF to determine what receptors they bind to and outline their pathways. There is evidence that CD23 is the receptor for BCDF. It was concluded that neither BCGF nor BCDF shared a receptor with IL-2. At least one pathway of B cell maturation via 446-BCDF, derived from anti-CD3 peripheral blood T cells, may involve reduction of intracellular cAMP. Stimulation by 446-BCDF causes an influx of calcium.

== Immune system interactions ==
BCGFs and BCDFs primarily travel through the body intravenously but tend to be more concentrated in sites most critical to the human immune system - the lymph nodes, thyroid, spleen, bone marrow, and liver. The environments in all of these areas are complex ecosystems of various cell types, states, and concentrations of factors. So, in general, B cell activation, proliferation, and differentiation appears to be a complex process dependent on many cell and factor interactions as well as the state of activation of the cell.

The interconnected nature of the immune system has caused many complications, for when looking at cells in model systems, it has often been unclear which, if any, factor actually exerted their effects directly on the B cells themselves as opposed to acting via accessory cells or in conjunction with other factors.

== Related diseases ==
Common diseases associated with the dysregulation of B cells are autoimmunity, immune deficiency, and various blood-associated cancers. BCGFs and BCDFs are associated with these diseases because they control crucial parts of the B cell life cycle - the cell's growth and identity. For example, if BCGFs are present at an extremely high concentration, cells may multiply very quickly exhibiting cancer-like behavior or extreme levels of immune response. Similarly, extreme differentiation towards a specific lineage may make the immune system weakened in some areas or too powerful and cause immune-related disease.

Different lineages or states of T cells secrete various BCDF subgroups. Maintaining the balance of the number and proportion of these cells is critical, as deficiencies in one or more subgroups cause disease, such as common variable immunodeficiency and chronic lymphocytic leukemia.

Dysregulation of growth factor production is a characteristic of some diseases such as rheumatoid arthritis, ankylosing spondylitis, systemic lupus erythematosus, and traumatic joint injury, where high levels of BCDF and IL-2 are present in the synovial fluid, resulting in increased differentiation of B lymphocytes into plasma cells and Ig secreting cells that secrete so many antibodies that they generate an immune response and inflammation in locations where they accumulate.
