= Mixed autoimmune hemolytic anemia =

Rare autoimmune disease

- Specialty: Hematology
- Frequency: 0.0001%

Mixed autoimmune hemolytic anemia (MAIHA) is a type of autoimmune hemolytic anemia which combines the features of cold sensitive antibody-induced diseases and warm autoimmune hemolytic anemia. The work-up for diagnosis is complex and the condition can be over-diagnosed.

People diagnosed with warm autoimmune hemolytic anemia (WAIHA) caused by immunoglobulin G (IgG) may also have a high number of immunoglobulin M (IgM) antibodies. These antibodies are active at room temperature, but are believed to be harmless since they are not the main antibodies responsible for WAIHA.

However, studies revealed the existence of a few cases of WAIHA that may also carry cold agglutinin antibodies that are active at the environment where the temperatures is generally equal to or warmer than 30 °C (86 °F). Such coexistence suggests a diagnosis of the mixed (warm- and cold-antibody) autoimmune hemolytic anemia abbreviated as MAIHA.

Mixed warm and cold AIHA runs a chronic course with severe intermittent exacerbations, such as serious anemia, and is treated by blood transfusion. Successful therapeutic options for the treatment of hemolysis associated with mixed AIHA are limited but increasing.

In the past, there were two obvious sources of error regarding the diagnosis of AIHA. First, patients with w-AIHA can produce low-titer, low-thermal amplitude CA of no clinical significance. Second, up to 20% of patients with CAD have IgG on the RBC surface in addition to C3d.

== See also ==
- Thermal amplitude (medical)
