= Spherocytosis =

Abnormal presence of spherical red blood cells in the blood

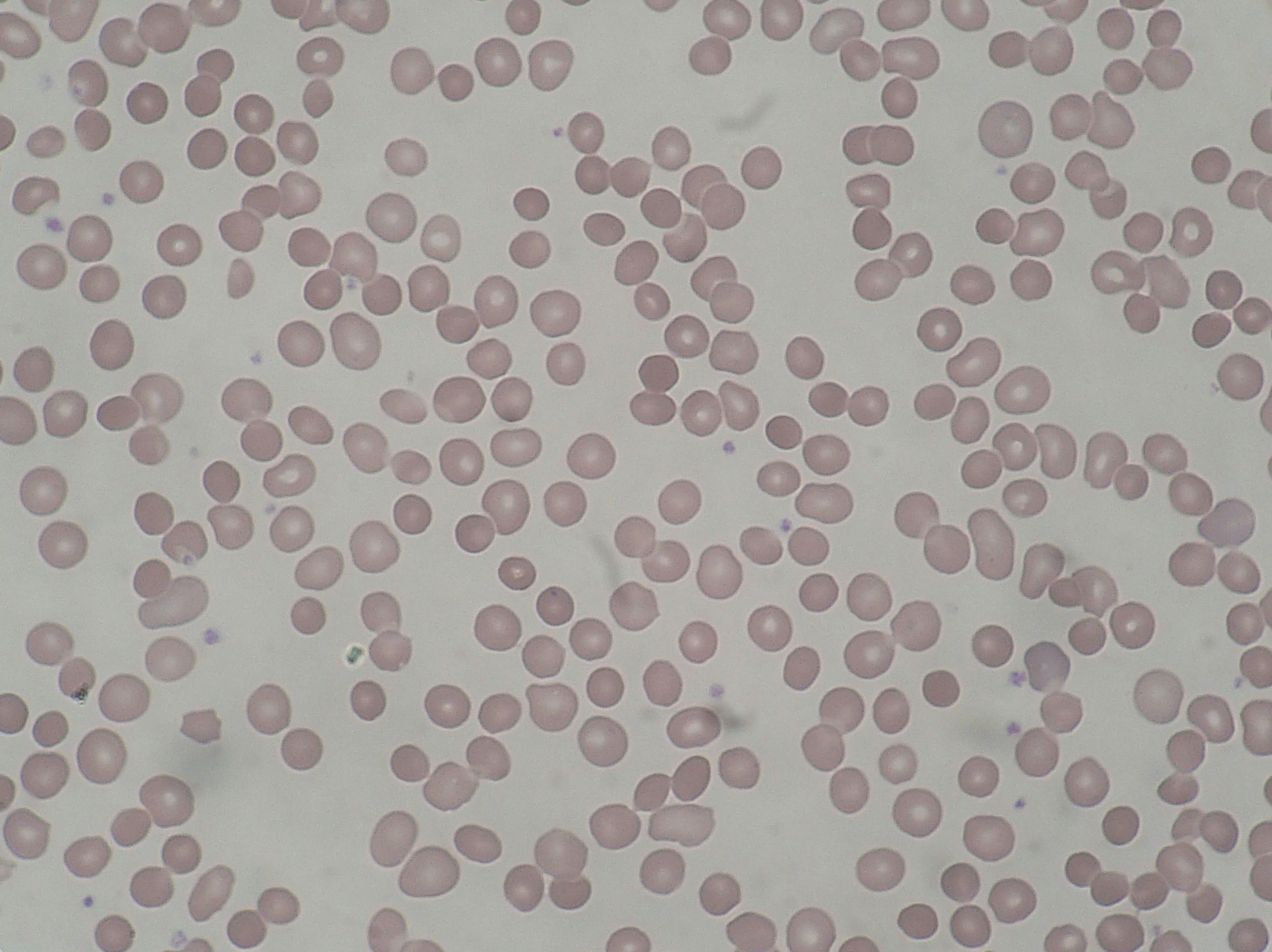
- Spherocytosis seen in a peripheral blood smear from a patient with hereditary spherocytosis
- Specialty: Hematology

Spherocytosis is the presence of spherocytes in the blood, i.e. erythrocytes (red blood cells) that are sphere-shaped rather than bi-concave disk shaped as normal. Spherocytes are found in all hemolytic anemias to some degree. Hereditary spherocytosis and autoimmune hemolytic anemia are characterized by having only spherocytes.

== Causes ==
Spherocytes are found in immunologically-mediated hemolytic anemias and in hereditary spherocytosis, but the former would have a positive direct Coombs test and the latter would not. The misshapen but otherwise healthy red blood cells are mistaken by the spleen for old or damaged red blood cells and it thus constantly breaks them down, causing a cycle whereby the body destroys its own blood supply (auto-hemolysis). A complete blood count (CBC) may show increased reticulocytes, a sign of increased red blood cell production, and decreased hemoglobin and hematocrit. The term "non-hereditary spherocytosis" is occasionally used, albeit rarely.

Lists of causes:

- Warm autoimmune hemolytic anemia
- Cold autoimmune hemolytic anemia/paroxysmal cold hemoglobinuria
- Acute and delayed hemolytic transfusion reactions
- ABO hemolytic diseases of newborn/Rh hemolytic disease of newborn
- Hereditary spherocytosis
- Intravenous water infusion or drowning (fresh water)
- Hypophosphatemia
- Bartonellosis
- Snake bites
- Hyposplenism
- Rh-null phenotype

== Pathophysiology ==
Spherocytosis most often refers to hereditary spherocytosis. This is caused by a molecular defect in one or more of the proteins of the red blood cell cytoskeleton, including spectrin, ankyrin, Band 3, or Protein 4.2. Because the cell skeleton has a defect, the blood cell contracts to a sphere, which is its most surface tension efficient and least flexible configuration. Though the spherocytes have a smaller surface area through which oxygen and carbon dioxide can be exchanged, they in themselves perform adequately to maintain healthy oxygen supplies. However, they have a high osmotic fragility—when placed into water, they are more likely to burst than normal red blood cells. These cells are more prone to physical degradation.

In short, spherocytosis has an attribute of decreased cell deformability.

== Diagnosis ==
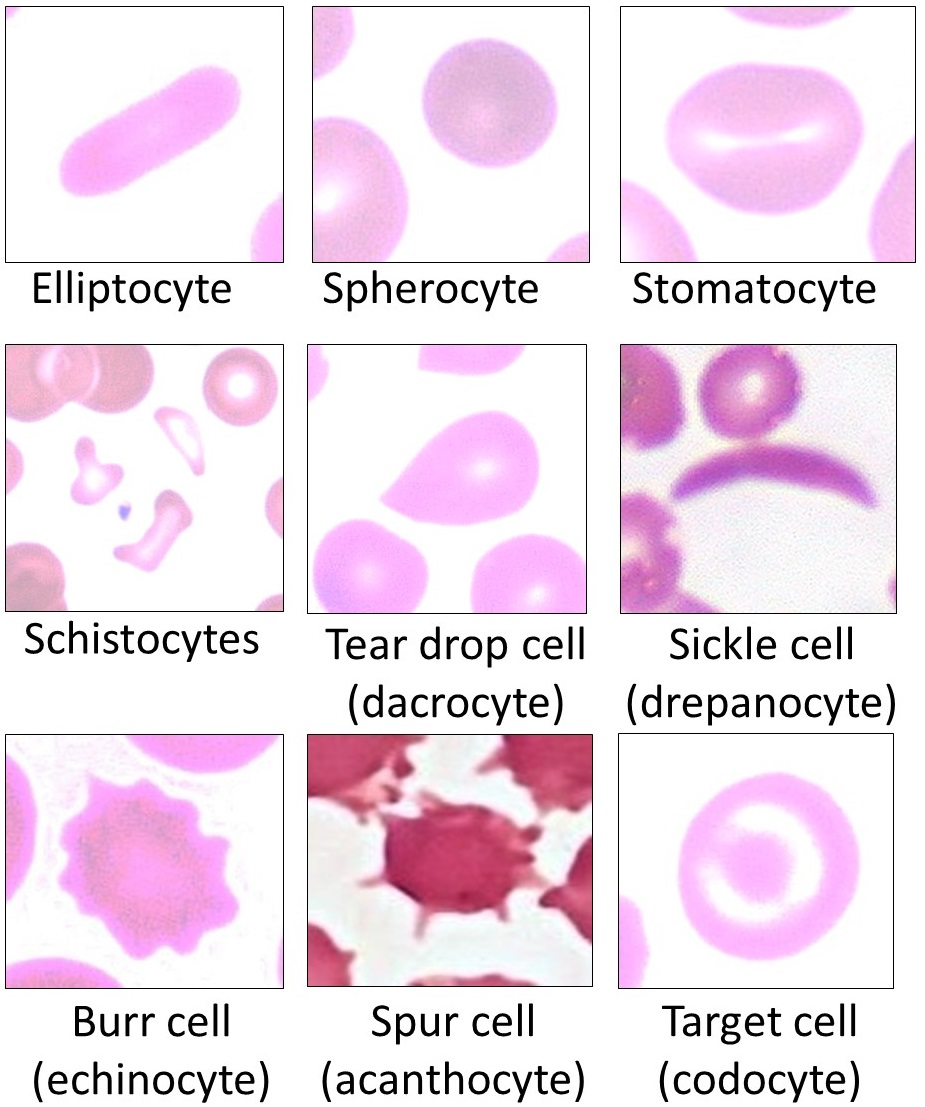
Spherocyte compared to other forms of poikilocytosis.

Spherocytosis can be diagnosed in Peripheral blood film by seeing spherical red blood cells rather than biconcave. Because spherical red blood cells are more prone to lysis in water (because they lack some proteins in their cytoskeleton) there will be increased osmotic fragility on acidified glycerol lysis test.

== Treatment ==
Treatment may vary depending on the cause of the condition. In the case of hereditary spherocytosis, although research is ongoing, at this point there is no cure for the genetic defect that causes hereditary spherocytosis. Current management focuses on interventions that limit the severity of the disease. Treatment options for this type of spherocytosis include:

- Splenectomy: As in non-hereditary spherocytosis, acute symptoms of anemia and hyperbilirubinemia indicate treatment with blood transfusions or exchanges and chronic symptoms of anemia and an enlarged spleen indicate dietary supplementation of folic acid and splenectomy, the surgical removal of the spleen. Splenectomy is indicated for moderate to severe cases, but not mild cases. To decrease the risk of sepsis, post-splenectomy spherocytosis patients require immunization against the influenza virus, encapsulated bacteria such as Streptococcus pneumoniae and meningococcus, and prophylactic antibiotic treatment. However, the use of prophylactic antibiotics, such as penicillin, remains controversial.
- Partial splenectomy: Since the spleen is important for protecting against encapsulated organisms, sepsis caused by encapsulated organisms is a possible complication of splenectomy. The option of partial splenectomy may be considered in the interest of preserving immune function. Research on outcomes is currently limited, but favorable.
- Surgical removal of the gallbladder may be necessary.

== See also ==
- Anemia
- Blood
- Blood diseases
- Red blood cells
- Hereditary diseases
