= Hemoglobinuria =

Abnormally increased hemoglobin in urine

- Other names: Haemoglobinuria
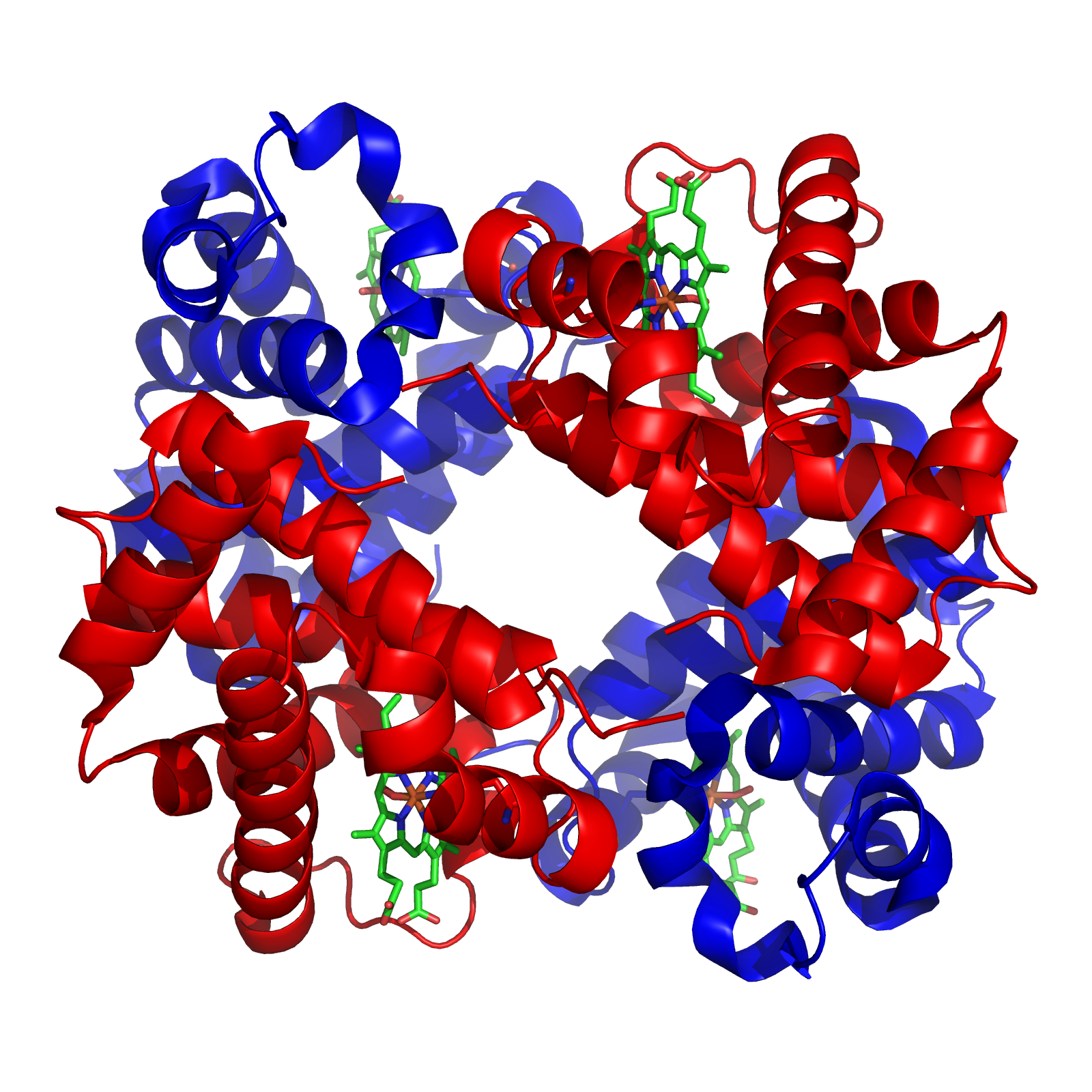
- Structure of hemoglobin
- Specialty: Urology, nephrology
- Symptoms: Disease, Hemolytic anemia, Proteinuria
- Causes: Acute glomerulonephritis; Burns; Renal cancer; Malaria; Paroxysmal nocturnal hemoglobinuria; Microangiopathies, e.g. hemolytic-uremic syndrome (HUS), thrombotic thrombocytopenic purpura (TTP) leading to microangiopathic hemolytic anemia; Transfusion reactions; IgM autoimmune hemolytic anemia; Glucose-6-phosphate dehydrogenase deficiency; Pyelonephritis; Sickle cell anemia; Tuberculosis of the urinary tract; March hemoglobinuria secondary to repetitive impacts on the body, usually the feet; Athletic nephritis secondary to strenuous exercise; Acute lead poisoning

Hemoglobinuria is a condition in which the oxygen transport protein hemoglobin is found in abnormally high concentrations in the urine. The condition is caused by excessive intravascular hemolysis, in which large numbers of red blood cells (RBCs) are destroyed, thereby releasing free hemoglobin into the plasma. Excess hemoglobin is filtered by the kidneys, which excrete it into the urine, giving urine a discolored appearance.

== Pathophysiology ==
When red blood cells are lysed, cell-free hemoglobin will bind to hemoglobin binding protein known as haptoglobin in order to prevent it from reaching the kidneys' filtration system, instead forming large complexes to be targeted and cleared by macrophages. In the absence of adequate defenses to remove hemoglobin in excess, hemoglobin can cause damage to the kidneys due to direct cytotoxic effects, oxidative stress, and endothelial dysfunction. In conditions with intravascular hemolysis, the binding capacity of available haptoglobin can be fully saturated by free hemoglobin. It is subsequently filtered through the glomerulus and actively reabsorbed by the proximal tubular cells until the reabsorptive capacity is over exceeded. This results in hemoglobin appearing in the urine, or hemoglobinuria.

== Causes ==
This condition can result from different mechanisms of RBC destruction, which can be genetic, acquired, or related to physical or infectious factors.

Inherited disorders consist of conditions such as paroxysmal nocturnal hemoglobinuria (PNH), G6PD deficiency, and sickle cell disease. PNH produces red blood cells with defective genes for CD55 and CD59 surface proteins, destroying the blood cells and leading to the classical appearance of dark urine in the morning. In G6PD deficiency, the lack of the G6PD enzyme enables complement mediated destruction against the RBCs, enhanced by certain exposures like medications, fava beans, and infections. SCD patients have red blood cells that are constantly destroyed due to sickled membrane abnormalities.

Hemolysis is also seen in autoimmune and immune mediated conditions when the red blood cells are attacked due to their components or incompatibility with their host. One acquired etiology is autoimmune hemolytic anemia (AIHA) which was shown to be the most common cause of hemoglobin cast nephropathy; causing nearly 30% of total cases studied, AIHA may cause intravascular hemolysis in severe cases. Other acquired causes include medication induced hemolysis and acute hemolytic transfusion reactions.

Some other known causes for plasma free hemoglobin involve physical or mechanical injury, such as March hemoglobinuria brought on from repetitive impact to the vessels in the feet. Typically seen in runners and military persons, an example of this was first noted in 1881 where a German soldier passed dark urine after prolonged marching. In microangiopathic hemolytic anemias (MAHAs), patients undergo shearing of red blood cells in abnormally small vessels or from formed microthrombi; a couple conditions that fall under this category are hemolytic-uremic syndrome (HUS) and thrombotic thrombocytopenic purpura (TTP).

== Signs ==
Hemoglobinuria patients may experience urine colored red to brown/black, fatigue, jaundice, dyspnea, tachycardia, and hypotension. Abdominal pain, esophageal spasm, dysphagia, and sternal pain occur with intravascular hemolysis in a dose-dependent manner.

== Diagnosis ==
The diagnosis is often made based on the medical history, blood samples, and a urine sample. The absence of urine RBCs and RBC casts microscopically despite a positive dipstick test suggests hemoglobinuria or myoglobinuria. The medical term for RBCs in the urine is hematuria.

=== Laboratory tests ===
Laboratory tests for intravascular hemolysis should be checked to confirm the suspected diagnosis. These include: elevated levels of lactate dehydrogenase (LDH), decreased or absent haptoglobin, elevated unconjugated bilirubin, and reticulocytosis. LDH levels will be much higher than in extravascular hemolysis. Hemosiderinuria, or iron-containing cells in the urine, occurs only with severe intravascular hemolysis and indicates recurrent or chronic hemoglobinuria.

The direct antiglobulin test, or Coombs test, will help differentiate immune from non-immune causes of hemolytic anemia. A peripheral blood smear will provide clues to the underlying disease, including schistocytes in MAHA and spherocytes in AIHA.

== Complications ==
A major complication of hemoglobinuria is tubular cell damage from the harmful effects of excess hemoglobin and its derivatives. One type of acute kidney injury is acute tubular necrosis caused by the toxicity of heme, hemoglobin casts that cause tubular obstruction, and decreased blood flow to the kidneys. Acute tubular necrosis can cause acute renal failure with oliguria and increased creatinine levels, and often results in the death of patients recovering from severe trauma.

== Treatment ==
Appropriate treatment for hemoglobinuria requires treating of the underlying cause of hemolysis; in the study that had 27 patients with biopsy-proven hemoglobin cast nephropathy, 78% regained normal renal function after treatment of their respective causes. This involves delivering prompt renal supportive care and other interventions as necessitated. Some examples of renal protective measures include IV fluid resuscitation, urine alkalinization, electrolyte monitoring, diuretics as needed, and in some cases, dialysis.

Some conditions will also require adjunct therapies or treatments specific to the underlying cause. Corticosteroids and monoclonal antibodies like rituximab are used to treat AIHA with initial response rates up 80 percent. Discontinuation or removal of the offending agent is the mainstay of treatment for acute hemolytic transfusion reaction and medication induced hemolysis. Complement inhibitors like eculizumab are used to treat PNH, with hematopoietic stem cell transplant reserved for refractory cases or patients with severe bone marrow failure.

== See also ==
- Hematuria
