= Evans syndrome =

- Specialty: Hematology

Evans syndrome is an autoimmune disease in which an individual's immune system attacks the red blood cells and platelets; it may include immune neutropenia. These immune cytopenias may occur simultaneously or sequentially.

Its overall phenotype resembles a combination of autoimmune hemolytic anemia and immune thrombocytopenic purpura. Autoimmune hemolytic anemia is a condition in which the red blood cells that normally carry oxygen are destroyed by an autoimmune process. Immune thrombocytopenic purpura is a condition in which platelets are destroyed by an autoimmune process. Platelets are a component of blood that contribute to the formation of blood clots in the body to prevent bleeding.

The syndrome was first described in 1951 by R. S. Evans and colleagues.

== Signs and symptoms ==
The symptoms of Evans syndrome vary between patients depending on which blood cells are affected. If red blood cells are attacked, symptoms may include weakness and fatigue, paleness or jaundice, shortness of breath, lightheadedness, and/or a fast heartbeat. If platelets are attacked, symptoms may include increased bruising, prolonged nosebleeds, increased bleeding from minor cuts, and/or Petechiae. In the less common instance that white blood cells are attacked, symptoms may include increased proneness to infection, fevers, and/or mouth sores.

It has been variously reported that between 7.8% and 23% of patients who have autoimmune hemolytic anemia, will also have thrombocytopenia and thus Evans syndrome. The two cytopenias may occur together or sequentially.

== Causes ==
Although Evans syndrome seems to be a disorder of immune regulation, the exact pathophysiology is unknown, but a gradual loss of self-tolerance is postulated. Autoantibodies targeted at different antigenic determinants on red cells and platelets are assumed to cause isolated episodes of hemolytic anemia and thrombocytopenia, respectively.

== Diagnosis ==
Diagnosis of Evans syndrome is separated into primary and secondary presentation. There is no single test to confirm a diagnosis of either form of Evans syndrome. It is instead a diagnosis made after a thorough clinical history, documentation of common symptoms, clinical evaluation, and exclusion of all other possible conditions.

The diagnosis of primary Evans syndrome is made upon blood tests to confirm not only hemolytic anemia and immune thrombocytopenic purpura, but also a positive direct antiglobulin test (DAT) and an absence of any known underlying cause. Additional tests used to eliminate the possibility of other conditions include a computed tomography (CT) scan and a biopsy of bone marrow.

A diagnosis of secondary Evans syndrome is indicative of occurrence after another autoimmune disease is already present. In 27% to 50% of cases there is an associated malignancy or a predisposing autoimmune disease. Pre-existing autoimmune diseases can include autoimmune lymphoproliferative syndrome (ALPS), combined variable immunodeficiency (CVID), systemic autoimmune disease, or another disorder of immune dysregulation.

Other antibodies may occur directed against neutrophils and lymphocytes, and "immunopancytopenia" has been suggested as an alternative term for this syndrome.

== Treatment ==
Initial treatment is with glucocorticoid corticosteroids or intravenous immunoglobulin, a treatment that is also used in ITP cases. In children, it can remain well controlled with a long term immunosuppressant therapy that will occasionally lead to a spontaneous complete resolution of the condition. Although the majority of cases initially respond well to treatment, relapses are not uncommon and immunosuppressive drugs (e.g. ciclosporin, mycophenolate mofetil, vincristine and danazol) are subsequently used, or combinations of these.

The off-label use of rituximab (trade name Rituxan) has produced some good results in acute and refractory cases, although further relapse may occur within a year. Splenectomy is effective in some cases, but relapses are not uncommon.

The only prospect for a permanent cure is the high-risk option of an allogeneic hematopoietic stem cell transplantation (SCT).

== Prognosis ==
In a nationwide study of Evans syndrome the median survival was 7.2 years (primary Evans syndrome: 10.9 years; secondary Evans syndrome: 1.7 years). Secondary Evans syndrome was associated with higher mortality rate than primary Evans syndrome, with a five-year survival of 38%. Among patients with Evans syndrome, the prevailing causes of death were bleeding, infections, and hematological cancer.

It has been observed that there is a risk of developing other autoimmune problems and hypogammaglobulinemia, in one cohort 58% of children with Evans syndrome had CD4-/CD8- T cells which is a strong predictor for having autoimmune lymphoproliferative syndrome.

== Epidemiology ==
Evans syndrome is considered a very rare autoimmune disease. Only one study has estimated incidence and prevalence adults. In Denmark in 2016 the annual incidence was 1.8 per 1,000,000 person years, and the prevalence was 21.3 per 1,000,000 living persons. In pre-pubertal children the incidence has been estimated to be between 0.7 and 1.2 per 1,000,000 person-years.

== See also ==
- Hematology
