= Hemolytic anemia =

Reduced oxygen-carrying ability of the blood due to breakdown of red blood cells

- Other names: Haemolytic anaemia
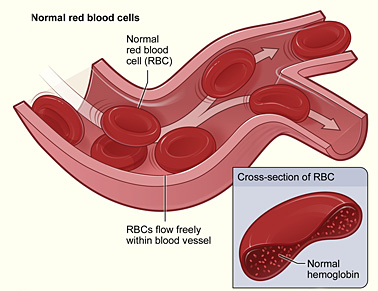
- Figure shows normal red blood cells flowing freely in a blood vessel. The inset image shows a cross-section of a normal red blood cell with normal hemoglobin.
- Specialty: Hematology
- Causes: Hemolysis

Hemolytic anemia or haemolytic anaemia is a form of anemia due to hemolysis, the abnormal breakdown of red blood cells (RBCs), either in the blood vessels (intravascular hemolysis) or elsewhere in the human body (extravascular). This most commonly occurs within the spleen, but also can occur in the reticuloendothelial system or mechanically (prosthetic valve damage). Hemolytic anemia accounts for 5% of all existing anemias. It has numerous possible consequences, ranging from general symptoms to life-threatening systemic effects. The general classification of hemolytic anemia is either intrinsic or extrinsic. Treatment depends on the type and cause of the hemolytic anemia.

Symptoms of hemolytic anemia are similar to other forms of anemia (fatigue and shortness of breath), but in addition, the breakdown of red cells leads to jaundice and increases the risk of particular long-term complications, such as gallstones and pulmonary hypertension.

== Signs and symptoms ==
Symptoms of hemolytic anemia are similar to the general signs of anemia. General signs and symptoms include fatigue, pallor, shortness of breath, and tachycardia. In small children, failure to thrive may occur in any form of anemia. In addition, symptoms related to hemolysis may be present such as chills, jaundice, dark urine, and an enlarged spleen. Certain aspects of the medical history can suggest a cause for hemolysis, such as drugs, medication side effects, autoimmune disorders, blood transfusion reactions, the presence of prosthetic heart valve, or other medical illness.

Chronic hemolysis leads to an increased excretion of bilirubin into the biliary tract, which in turn may lead to gallstones. The continuous release of free hemoglobin has been linked with the development of pulmonary hypertension (increased pressure over the pulmonary artery); this, in turn, leads to episodes of syncope (fainting), chest pain, and progressive breathlessness. Pulmonary hypertension eventually causes right ventricular heart failure, the symptoms of which are peripheral edema (fluid accumulation in the skin of the legs) and ascites (fluid accumulation in the abdominal cavity).

== Causes ==
They may be classified according to the means of hemolysis, being either intrinsic in cases where the cause is related to the red blood cell (RBC) itself, or extrinsic in cases where factors external to the RBC dominate. Intrinsic effects may include problems with RBC proteins or oxidative stress handling, whereas external factors include immune attack and microvascular angiopathies (RBCs are mechanically damaged in circulation).

=== Intrinsic causes ===
Hereditary (inherited) hemolytic anemia can be due to :

- Defects of red blood cell membrane production (as in hereditary spherocytosis and hereditary elliptocytosis).
- Defects in hemoglobin production (as in thalassemia, sickle-cell disease and congenital dyserythropoietic anemia).
- Defective red cell metabolism (as in glucose-6-phosphate dehydrogenase deficiency and pyruvate kinase deficiency).
- Wilson's disease may infrequently present with hemolytic anemia without due to excessive inorganic copper in blood circulation, which destroys red blood cells (though the mechanism of hemolysis is still unclear).
- GLUT1 deficiency syndrome 2 may sometimes cause Hemolytic anemia.

=== Extrinsic causes ===
Acquired hemolytic anemia may be caused by immune-mediated causes, drugs, and other miscellaneous causes.

- Immune-mediated causes could include transient factors as in Mycoplasma pneumoniae infection (cold agglutinin disease) or permanent factors as in autoimmune diseases like autoimmune hemolytic anemia (itself more common in diseases such as systemic lupus erythematosus, rheumatoid arthritis, Hodgkin's lymphoma, and chronic lymphocytic leukemia).
- Spur cell hemolytic anemia
- Any of the causes of hypersplenism (increased activity of the spleen), such as portal hypertension.
- Acquired hemolytic anemia is also encountered in burns and as a result of certain infections (e.g. malaria).
- Paroxysmal nocturnal hemoglobinuria (PNH), sometimes referred to as Marchiafava–Micheli syndrome, is a rare, acquired, potentially life-threatening disease of the blood characterized by complement-induced intravascular hemolytic anemia.
- Lead poisoning resulting from the environment causes non-immune hemolytic anemia.
- Similarly, poisoning by arsine or stibine also causes hemolytic anemia.
- Runners can develop hemolytic anemia due to "footstrike hemolysis", owing to the destruction of red blood cells in feet at foot impact.
- Low-grade hemolytic anemia occurs in 70% of prosthetic heart valve recipients, and severe hemolytic anemia occurs in 3%.

=== Combination ===
Sometimes hemolytic anemia can be caused by a combination of two causes, neither sufficient on its own.

- G6PD deficiency by itself is usually asymptomatic, but when combined with external stress such as an infection, fava beans, or oxidative drugs like primaquine it can become symptomatic.
- Primaquine and tafenoquine can pass through the placenta, causing hemolytic anemia in utero if the fetus has G6PD deficiency.

Among American ethnicities, G6PD is most prevalent among African Americans, with a prevalence of about 12.2% (males) and 4.1% (females). During the Korean War, many black soldiers developed acute hemolytic anemia after primaquine for treatment or prophylaxis of malaria, which led to early understanding of this kind of anemia.

== Mechanism ==
In hemolytic anemia, there are two principal mechanisms of hemolysis; intravascular and extravascular.

=== Intravascular hemolysis ===
Intravascular hemolysis describes hemolysis that happens mainly inside the vasculature. As a result, the contents of the red blood cell are released into the general circulation, leading to hemoglobinemia and increasing the risk of ensuing hyperbilirubinemia.Intravascular hemolysis may occur when red blood cells are targeted by autoantibodies, leading to complement fixation, or by damage by parasites such as Babesia.

=== Extravascular hemolysis ===
Extravascular hemolysis refers to hemolysis taking place in the liver, spleen, bone marrow, and lymph nodes. In this case little hemoglobin escapes into blood plasma. The macrophages of the reticuloendothelial system in these organs engulf and destroy structurally-defective red blood cells, or those with antibodies attached, and release unconjugated bilirubin into the blood plasma circulation. Typically, the spleen destroys mildly abnormal red blood cells or those coated with IgG-type antibodies, while severely abnormal red blood cells or those coated with IgM-type antibodies are destroyed in the circulation or in the liver.

If extravascular hemolysis is extensive, hemosiderin can be deposited in the spleen, bone marrow, kidney, liver, and other organs, resulting in hemosiderosis.

In a healthy person, a red blood cell survives 90 to 120 days in the circulation, so about 1% of human red blood cells break down each day. The spleen (part of the reticulo-endothelial system) is the main organ that removes old and damaged RBCs from the circulation. In healthy individuals, the breakdown and removal of RBCs from the circulation is matched by the production of new RBCs in the bone marrow.

In conditions where the rate of RBC breakdown is increased, the body initially compensates by producing more RBCs; however, breakdown of RBCs can exceed the rate that the body can make RBCs, and so anemia can develop. Bilirubin, a breakdown product of hemoglobin, can accumulate in the blood, causing jaundice.

In general, hemolytic anemia occurs as a modification of the RBC life cycle. That is, instead of being collected at the end of its useful life and disposed of normally, the RBC disintegrates in a manner allowing free iron-containing molecules to reach the blood. With their complete lack of mitochondria, RBCs rely on pentose phosphate pathway (PPP) for the materials needed to reduce oxidative damage. Any limitations of PPP can result in more susceptibility to oxidative damage and a short or abnormal lifecycle. If the cell is unable to signal to the reticuloendothelial phagocytes by externalizing phosphatidylserine, it is likely to lyse through uncontrolled means.

The distinguishing feature of intravascular hemolysis is the release of RBC contents into the blood stream. The metabolism and elimination of these products, largely iron-containing compounds capable of doing damage through Fenton reactions, is an important part of the condition. Several reference texts exist on the elimination pathways, for example. Free hemoglobin can bind to haptoglobin, and the complex is cleared from the circulation; thus, a decrease in haptoglobin can support a diagnosis of hemolytic anemia. Alternatively, hemoglobin may oxidize and release the heme group that is able to bind to either albumin or hemopexin. The heme is ultimately converted to bilirubin and removed in stool and urine. Hemoglobin may be cleared directly by the kidneys resulting in fast clearance of free hemoglobin but causing the continued loss of hemosiderin loaded renal tubular cells for many days.

Additional effects of free hemoglobin seem to be due to specific reactions with NO.

== Diagnosis ==
The diagnosis of hemolytic anemia can be suspected on the basis of a constellation of symptoms and is largely based on the presence of anemia, an increased proportion of immature red cells (reticulocytes) and a decrease in the level of haptoglobin, a protein that binds free hemoglobin. Examination of a peripheral blood smear and some other laboratory studies can contribute to the diagnosis. Symptoms of hemolytic anemia include those that can occur in all anemias as well as the specific consequences of hemolysis. All anemias can cause fatigue, shortness of breath, decreased ability to exercise when severe. Symptoms specifically related to hemolysis include jaundice and dark colored urine due to the presence of hemoglobin (hemoglobinuria). When restricted to the morning hemoglobinuria may suggest paroxysmal nocturnal haemoglobinuria. Direct examination of blood under a microscope in a peripheral blood smear may demonstrate red blood cell fragments called schistocytes, red blood cells that look like spheres (spherocytes), and/or red blood cells missing small pieces (bite cells). An increased number of newly made red blood cells (reticulocytes) may also be a sign of bone marrow compensation for anemia. Laboratory studies commonly used to investigate hemolytic anemia include blood tests for breakdown products of red blood cells, bilirubin and lactate dehydrogenase, a test for the free hemoglobin binding protein haptoglobin, and the direct Coombs test (also called direct antiglobulin test or DAT) to evaluate complement factors and/or antibodies binding to red blood cells:

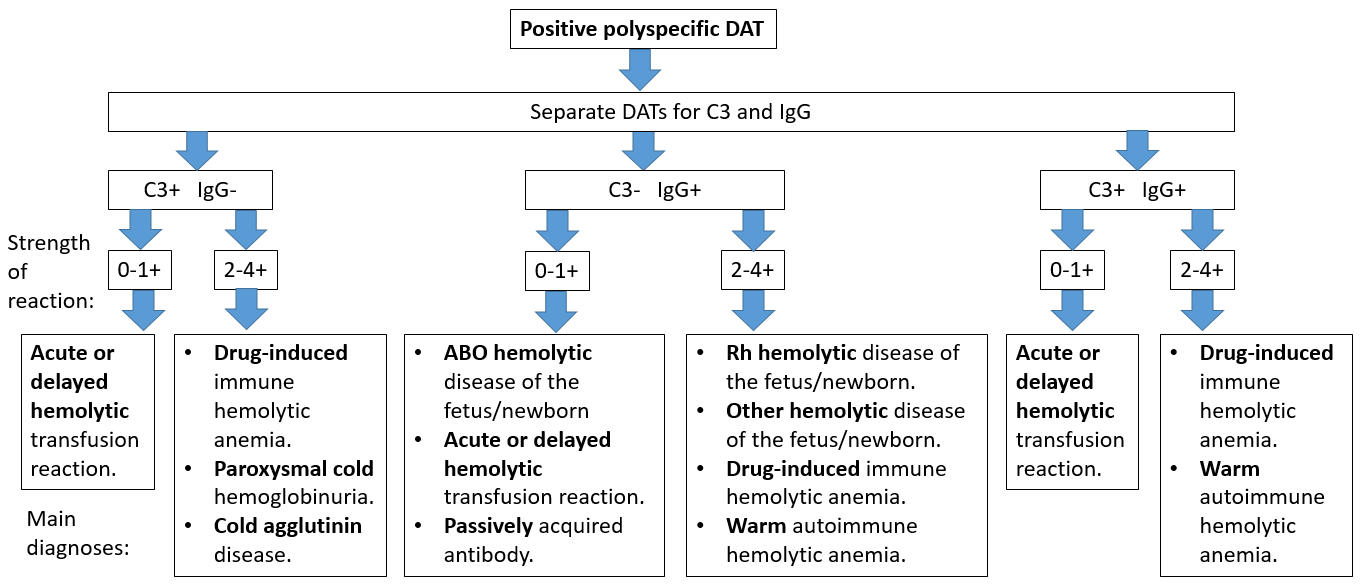
Algorithm for the main diagnoses in a positive DAT, using C3 to represent complement factors, and IgG as antibody type.

== Treatment ==
Definitive therapy depends on the cause:

- Symptomatic treatment can be given by blood transfusion, if there is marked anemia. A positive Coombs test is a relative contraindication to transfuse the patient. In cold hemolytic anemia there is advantage in transfusing warmed blood.
- In severe immune-related hemolytic anemia, steroid therapy is sometimes necessary.
- In steroid resistant cases, consideration can be given to rituximab or addition of an immunosuppressant (azathioprine, cyclophosphamide).
- Association of methylprednisolone and intravenous immunoglobulin can control hemolysis in acute severe cases.
- Sometimes splenectomy can be helpful where extravascular hemolysis, or hereditary spherocytosis, is predominant (i.e., most of the red blood cells are being removed by the spleen).

Mitapivat was approved for medical use in the United States in February 2022.

== Other animals ==
Hemolytic anemia affects nonhuman species as well as humans. It has been found, in a number of animal species, to result from specific triggers.

Some notable cases include hemolytic anemia found in black rhinos kept in captivity, with the disease, in one instance, affecting 20% of captive rhinos at a specific facility. The disease is also found in wild rhinos.

Dogs and cats differ slightly from humans in some details of their RBC composition and have altered susceptibility to damage, notably, increased susceptibility to oxidative damage from consumption of onion. Garlic is less toxic to dogs than onion.
