= Thermal amplitude (medical) =

Temperature range in which cold autoantibodies can bind to antigens

Thermal amplitude or thermal range is the range of temperatures in which a cold autoantibody or cold-reacting alloantibody binds to its antigen. Cold antibodies that can bind to antigen above 30 °C (86 °F) are considered potentially clinically significant and may lead to disease that occurs or worsens on exposure to low temperatures. The closer the thermal range comes to core body temperature (37 °C or 99 °F), the greater the chance that the antibody will cause symptoms such as anemia or Raynaud syndrome. Antibodies that are only reactive at temperatures below 30 °C (86 °F) are generally considered unlikely to be clinically significant.
