= Mechanical hemolytic anemia =

- Specialty: Hematology

Mechanical hemolytic anemia is a form of hemolytic anemia due to mechanically induced damage to red blood cells. Red blood cells, while flexible, may in some circumstances succumb to physical shear and compression. This may result in hemoglobinuria. The damage is induced through repetitive mechanical motions such as prolonged marching (march hemoglobinuria) and marathon running. Mechanical damage can also be induced through the chronic condition microangiopathic hemolytic anemia or due to prosthetic heart valves.

== Cause ==
Repetitive impacts to the body may cause mechanical trauma and bursting (hemolysis) of red blood cells. This has been documented to have occurred in the feet during running and hands from Conga or Candombe drumming. Defects in red blood cell membrane proteins have been identified in some of these patients. Free hemoglobin is released from lysed red blood cells and filtered into the urine.

== Hemolytic phenomena ==
=== March hemoglobinuria ===
March hemoglobinuria, occurs when hemoglobin is seen in the urine after repetitive impacts on the body, particularly affecting the feet. The word "march" is in reference to the condition arising in soldiers who have been marching for long periods; the condition was first documented in 1881.

=== Runner's macrocytosis ===
Runner's macrocytosis is a phenomenon of increased red blood cell size as a compensatory mechanism for increased red blood cell turnover. The impact forces from running can lead to red blood cell hemolysis and accelerate red blood cell production. This can shift the ratio of red blood cells towards younger, larger cells. This shift may be reflected in higher than normal mean corpuscular volume (MCV) values, an indicator of red blood cell size.

This is not a pathological condition but may indicate a propensity toward iron deficiency anemia due to high red blood cell turnover.
