= Cold sensitive antibodies =

Antibodies sensitive to cold temperature

- Other names: Cold reactive antibodies, cold reacting antibodies
- Specialty: Hematology

Cold sensitive antibodies (CSA) are antibodies sensitive to cold temperature. Some cold sensitive antibodies are pathological and can lead to blood disorder. These pathological cold sensitive antibodies include cold agglutinins, Donath–Landsteiner antibodies, and cryoglobulins which are the culprits of cold agglutinin disease, paroxysmal cold hemoglobinuria in the process of Donath–Landsteiner hemolytic anemia, and vasculitis, respectively.

== Cold agglutinin antibodies ==
Cold agglutinins are antibodies, typically immunoglobulin M (IgM), that are acquainted with and then binding the antigens on red blood cells, typically antigens "I" or "i" on the RBC surface, in the environment in which the temperatures are lower than normal core body temperature and, thus, ends up leading to agglutinations of the red blood cells and hemolysis reaction occurring outside the vessels (extra-vessels), resulting in anemia without hemoglobinuria in ordinary cases.

Cold agglutinins can cause two pathological conditions, that are, primary cold agglutinin disease (CAD) and secondary cold agglutinin syndrome (CAS), both of which are sole two subtypes of cold agglutinin disease.

Primary cold agglutinin disease is idiopathic, meaning the phenomenons of agglutinations of the red blood cells and hemolysis reaction occurring outside the vessels are absent from any underlying cause. Nevertheless, what is known is, those with idiopathic cold agglutinin disease are susceptible to having or developing mild clonal bone marrow disorder.

Secondary cold agglutinin syndrome refers to cold agglutinin disease that is identified to be caused by viral infection, autoimmune disorder, lymphoid malignancy, or any other underlying disease.

=== Thermal amplitude ===
Cold agglutinins (CA) are autoantibodies that agglutinate RBCs with a temperature optimum of 3-4 °C but may also act in a warmer environment, depending on the thermal amplitude of the CA. If the thermal amplitude exceeds 28–30 °C, the CA will be pathogenic. Low-affinity CA also occurs in many healthy individuals; these nonpathogenic CA are polyclonal, have low thermal amplitude, and are present in low titers, not higher than 256 and usually lower than 64. More than 90% of pathogenic CA are of the IgM class and these IgM macromolecules can be pentameric or hexameric.

== Donath–Landsteiner antibodies ==
Donath–Landsteiner antibodies share similarities with cold agglutinin disease in recognition and connection of the antigens on the red blood cells' surface in the presence of relatively lower temperatures compared to core body temperature. Yet, the place where the hemolysis taking place differentiates between D-L antibodies and cold agglutinin. D-L antibodies rather fix complement system which result in hemolysis in vessels (intra-vessels). Blood vessels are pathways carrying living-required elements to reach everywhere inside the body through circulation. This explains why the clinical manifestations of hemolysis caused by D-L antibodies are in line with representations of hemoglobinemia and hemoglobinuria. D-L antibodies, typically IgG, are characterized by targeting against red blood cells' on-surface antigens called "P".

The pathophysiology of Donath–Landsteiner hemolytic anemia has been entitled as paroxysmal cold hemoglobinuria.

== Cryoglobulin antibodies ==
Cryoglobulins are abnormal antibodies that only dissolve/disappear at temperature higher than 37 °C (99 °F) and form solid or gel-like immune complexes in presence of the environment under 37 °C (99 °F), which can block blood vessels and cause a variety of health problems including inflammation and organ damage.

Many people affected by cryoglobulins will not experience any unusual signs or symptoms. When present, symptoms vary but may include breathing problems; fatigue; glomerulonephritis; joint pain or muscle pain; purpura; Raynaud's phenomenon; skin death; and/or skin ulcers. In some cases, the exact underlying cause is unknown; however, cryoglobulinemia can be associated with a variety of conditions including certain types of infection; chronic inflammatory diseases (such as autoimmune disease); and/or cancers of the blood or immune system. Treatment varies based on the severity of the condition, the symptoms present in each person and the underlying cause.

At least 90% of cases having cryoglobulins in body, hepatitis C is to blame, reflecting the importance of preclusion of hepatitis C. The presence of cryoglobulins in body satisfies the criterion of the diagnosis of cryoglobulinemia, a disease that inflame the blood vessels and organs like kidney, nerves, joints, lungs and skin. Normally, no cryoglobulins should be found in the body.

Cryoglobulins more than often do not interact with red blood cells, unless it combines the features of cold agglutinin with cryoglobulins, although the chance is deemed rare. Therefore, cryoglobulins don't produce hemolysis effect, however its serious complications such as systemic inflammatory or neoplastic disorders can in turn lead to anemia.

== Comparisons between cold agglutinin, Donath–Landsteiner antibodies and cryoglobulin ==
Although there is some overlap of symptoms, cryoglobulinemia and cold agglutinin disease differ in the process by which blood vessels become blocked. In cryoglobulinemia, antibodies accumulate and block blood vessels. In cold agglutinin disease, antibodies (different from those in cryoglobulinemia) attack and kill red blood cells, which then accumulate and block blood vessels.

	Cold agglutinin antibodies	Donath–Landsteiner antibodies	Cryoglobulin
Associated disease	Cold agglutinin disease	Paroxysmal cold hemoglobinuria	Cryoglobulinemia
Typical antibody types	IgM	IgG	Various types, but usually monoclonal IgM plus polyclonal IgG (type II)
Typical antibody targets	I or i antigen	P antigen	Other immunoglobulins
Typical patients	Women over 70 years	Children	People over 60 years
Typical symptoms	Anemia, acrocyanosis	Dark urine, fever, chills, back or leg pain	Palpable purpura, arthralgias, myalgias
Hemolysis	Extravascular	Intravascular	No

Common features among the three conditions above include:

- All can trigger Raynaud's phenomenon.
- All may be caused by infections, autoimmune disorders as well as lymphoma or other lymphoproliferative disorders.

=== Complement ===
Complement activation plays a definitive but limited role in warm-antibody AIHA (w-AIHA), whereas primary cold agglutinin disease (CAD), secondary cold agglutinin syndrome (CAS), and paroxysmal cold hemoglobinuria (PCH) are entirely complement-dependent disorders.

=== Hemolysis site ===
Hemolysis induced by cold agglutinin disease taking place outside the vessels while which of Donath–Landsteiner antibodies is taking place inside the vessels.
