= Anti-immunoglobulin =

Protein that detects other antibodies

Anti-immunoglobulin antibodies are protein that detects other antibodies from an organism. Specifically, anti-immunoglobulin antibodies are created by B-cells as antibodies to bind to other immunoglobulins. Immunoglobulins have two regions: the constant region and the variable region. The constant region is involved in effector function, while the variable region is involved in recognizing and binding to antigens. Anti-immunoglobulin antibodies may bind to either the variable or constant region. Anti-immunoglobulin antibodies are a type of secondary antibody. They are able to detect primary antibodies through multiple methods such as a Western blot, immunohistochemistry, immunofluorescence staining, flow cytometry, and ELISA.

== Creation of Anti-immunoglobulin Antibodies ==
The anti-immunoglobulin antibodies are created through recombinant DNA technology. Production via recombinant DNA technology allows the highest level of batch-to-batch reproducibility. This method of antibody engineering can expand the antibody compatibility to multiple assay components. All anti-immunoglobulin antibodies are laboratory-made, so there are a type and are engineered in laboratory to mimic the effects of primary antibodies, they can either be monoclonal or polyclonal. Monoclonal antibodies are clones of one antibody; therefore, monoclonal antibodies can only bind to one target. Polyclonal antibodies are clones of multiple antibodies and immune cells, so they can bind to various targets. Recombinant clonal antibodies are produced through in-vitro cloning process occurs through inserting genes for an antibody's light and heavy region into an expression vector. The vector is then introduced into host cells for expression. Hosts can range from rabbits to mice to goats. Anti-immunoglobulin antibodies are recognizable by their clone name. The clone name is commonly placed in brackets after the written name.

== Anti-Human Immunoglobulin Antibodies ==
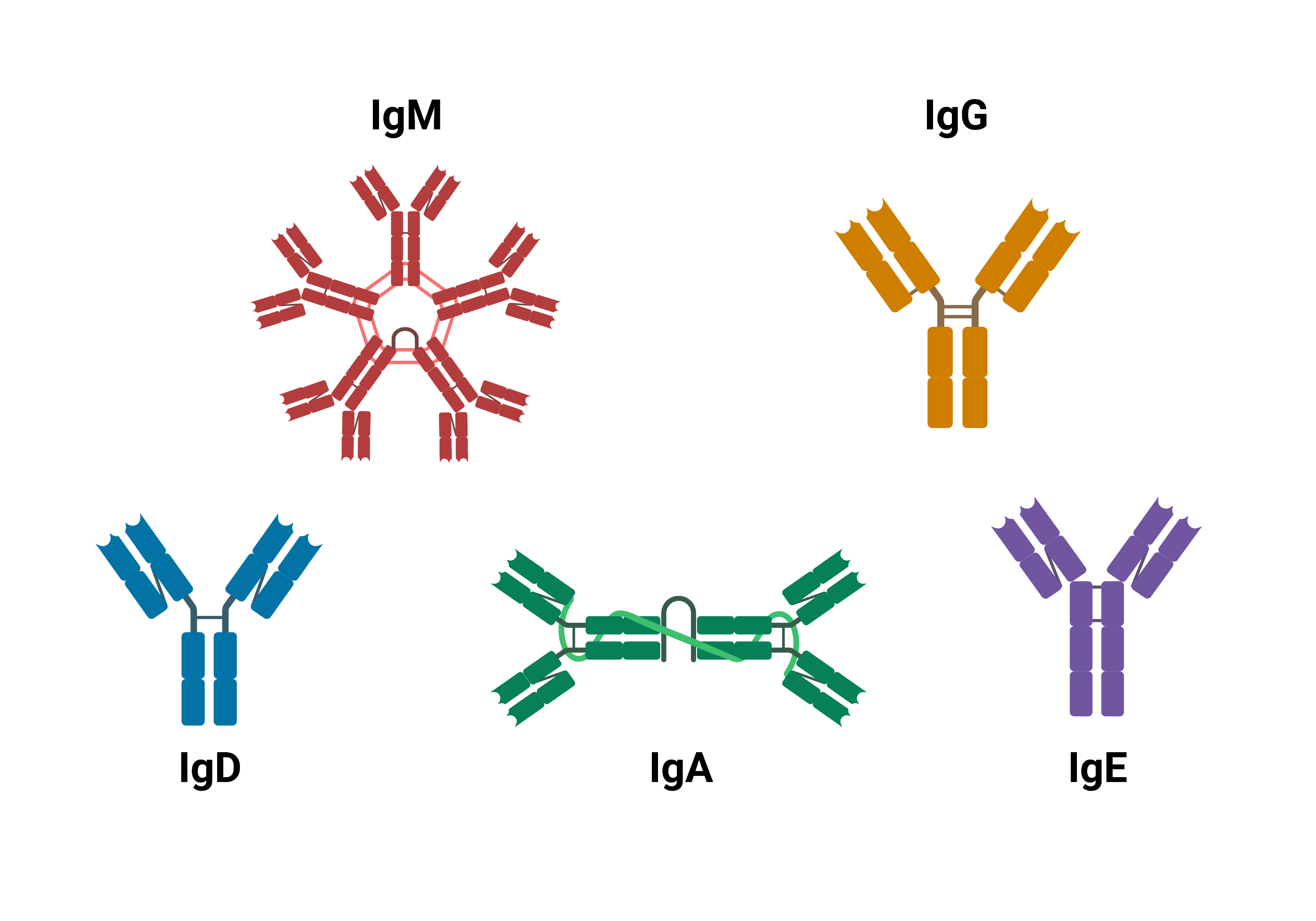
These are the five different human immunoglobulin antibodies that anti-human immunoglobulin antibodies can recognize via laboratory testing.

Anti-antibodies for human purposes are able to recognize IgM, IgA, IgE, IgD, and IgG. To detect all isotypes of human antibodies, anti-human kappa and lambda light chain antibodies are available. Anti-human immunoglobulin antibodies are available for purchase on a commercial laboratory scale.

=== Anti-IgG ===
There are anti-IgG antibodies that are heavy-and-light chain specific, Fc-part specific, and hinge-part specific.

Ant-IgG Type	Description
Anti-human IgG [17F12]	This is a recombinant monoclonal antibody to human IgG. It has the ability to bind to all 4 human IgG subtypes: IgG1, IgG2, IgG3, and IgG4.
Anti-Human IgG [8E11]	This is a recombinant monoclonal antibody to human IgG. However, it can screen for IgG in nonhuman primates including vervets, chimpanzees, and mangabeys. The anti-antibody can distinguish between human and nonhuman IgG.
Anti-Pan-Primate IgG [8F1]	This is a recombinant monoclonal antibody to Pan-primate IgG. The antibody reacts to most primate IgG, including human IgG. The most important use of anti-Pan-primate is to quantify IgG in homogenates from macaque lungs and lymph nodes.
Anti-IgG [NH3/130.5.2]	This is a recombinant monoclonal antibody to IgG. When using ELISA, the anti-antibody also recognizes rhesus macaque IgG1, cynomolgus monkey IgG1, and cynomolgus monkey IgG4.
Anti-IgG3 [NH3/15.8]	This is a recombinant monoclonal antibody to IgG3. Anti-IgG3 [NH3/15.8] is most commonly used in human IgG blood transfusion serology testing.

=== Anti-IgM ===
IgM antibodies are the largest antibodies and are the first to respond in an immune response. Anti-IgM antibodies are used to detect the presence of IgM antibodies in human serums. IgM antibodies are responsible for blood clotting during incorrect donor blood transfusions.

Anti-IgM Type	Description
Anti-IgM [M15/8]	This is a recombinant monoclonal antibody to IgM. The anti-antibody functions in early detection of antigens in serum rather than interstitial fluids.
Anti-IgM [B481]	This is a recombinant monoclonal antibody to IgM. It is recommended to use anti-IgM [B481] as a secondary antibody against IgM primary antibodies.

=== Anti-IgE ===
IgE antibodies are the least abundant immunoglobulins in the immune response. They are commonly found in response to allergic reactions. Using anti-antibodies for IgE can help prevent histamine responses.

Anti-IgE Type	Description
Anti-IgE [huMaE11 (Omalizumab)]	This is a recombinant monoclonal antibody to IgE. The antibody binds to IgE circulating in the blood. Therefore, IgE cannot bind to mast cells to trigger a histamine response. Anti-IgE [huMaE11 (Omalizumab)] is used in drugs that treat allergies and asthma.
Anti-IgE [TES-C21]	This is a recombinant monoclonal antibody to IgE. The anti-IgE antibody binds specifically to IgE antibodies by B cells (interleukins Il-4 and IL-13). Anti-IgE can be conjugated to cytotoxic drugs in order to deliver them to IgE-producing B cells.

=== Anti-IgA ===
The antibody IgA is most commonly found in mucosal secretions such as tears and saliva, but it is rarely found circulating in the bloodstream. Around 15% of antibodies produced each day are the IgA isotype.

Anti-IgA Type	Description
Anti-IgA [H15A43]	This is a recombinant monoclonal antibody to IgA. It specifically binds to the heavy chain of human IgA. Its most relevant application is the purification of IgA from serum.

=== Anti-IgD ===
Immature B-lymphocytes most commonly express the IgD isotype. IgD can also be found circulating in blood serum. IgD signals B cells to activate the immune response. This role is also shared by IgM. IgD is functional in the respiratory immune defense system since they activate basophils and mast cells that secrete antimicrobial factors.

Anti-IgD Type	Description
Anti-IgD [IgD26]	This is a recombinant monoclonal antibody. IgD26 can be used as either a primary or secondary antibody. Anti-IgD recognizes the IgD isotype present on immature B cells.

=== Anti-Lambda Light Chain ===
Lambda light chains are one of the two classes of light chains present on mammalian immunoglobulins. They are found in combination with kappa light chains. These chains are usually present in a 70:30 ratio of kappa to lambda. Anti-lambda light chain antibodies can nonspecifically bind to multiple isotypes of immunoglobulins.

Immunoglobulins will either express Kappa or Lambda light chains. This is a depiction of an immunoglobulin that expresses Lambda light chains. The anti-lambda light chain immunoglobulins will be able to recognize the Lambda light chains on specific immunoglobulin isotypes.

Anti-Lambda Light Chain Type	Description
Anti-Lambda Light Chain [N10/2]	This is a recombinant monoclonal antibody to the Lambda light chain. It does not cross react with Kappa light chains. N10/2 most importantly recognizes pathologies such as leukemias, plasmacytomas, and non-Hodgkin's lymphomas.

=== Anti-Kappa Light Chain ===
Kappa light chains are the second of the two classes of light chains present on mammalian immunoglobulins. One immunoglobulin only has one type of light chain. Each light chain has both a constant and a variable region.

Anti-Kappa Light Chain Type	Description
Anti-Kappa Light Chain [NH3/41.34]	This is a recombinant monoclonal antibody to the kappa light chain. Specifically, [NH3/41.34] binds to IgG antibodies via Western blot. There is no cross reactivity with cynomolgus monkey IgG1 and cynomolgus monkey IgG4, which are recognized by Anti-IgG [NH3/130.5.2].

It is critical to note that these are not the only anti-human immunoglobulin antibodies. These are examples of the most common anti-immunoglobulin antibodies used in current human research. These antibodies can be purchased on a commercial scale.

== Anti-Non-Human Immunoglobulin Antibodies ==
A majority of non-human immunoglobulin antibodies are detected in non-human primate (NHP) models. The NHP models serve as proxies for humans during preclinical studies. The most common NHP models for important antibody isotypes and subtypes include rhesus macaques, cynomolgus monkeys, and baboons. Therefore, certain antibodies will only react with certain NHP species. The most common antibody isotypes are rhesus monkey macaque and cynomolgus monkey IgG1 and IgG4.

=== Anti-Macaque ===
Anti-Macaque Antibody Type	Description
Anti-Macaque pan-species IgG [1B3]	This is a recombinant monoclonal antibody to Macaque pan-species IgG. This is used in ELISA to detect anti-rhesus mouse antibodies in serum. The antibody is able to distinguish between human and macaque IgG antibodies. In HIV research it has been used to detect macaque antibodies while against IV-administered HIV broadly neutralizing antibodies.

=== Anti-Baboon ===
While the methods used in Anti-baboon antibody creation and detection are very similar, each anti-antibody is responsible for identifying a different isotype of IgG. The isotypes include IgG1, IgG2, IgG3, and IgG4.

Anti-Rhesus Antibody Type	Description
Anti-Baboon IgG1 [7H4.G8.G10]	This is a recombinant monoclonal antibody to baboon IgG1. It specifically reacts with baboon IgG1 via ELISA. There is no cross reactivity with other primate IgG1 subtypes. Immunizing mice against a baboon immunoglobulin gives rise to anti-baboon IgG1.
Anti-Baboon IgG2 [1E11.1]	This is a recombinant monoclonal antibody to baboon IgG2. It specifically reacts with baboon IgG2 via ELISA. There is no cross reactivity with other primate IgG2 subtypes. Immunizing mice against a baboon immunoglobulin gives rise to anti-baboon IgG2.
Anti-Baboon IgG3 [4A6.1]	This is a recombinant monoclonal antibody to baboon IgG3. It specifically reacts with baboon IgG3 via ELISA. There is no cross reactivity with other primate IgG3 subtypes. Immunizing mice against a baboon immunoglobulin gives rise to anti-baboon IgG3.
Anti-Baboon IgG4 [5F3.E11.G4]	This is a recombinant monoclonal antibody to baboon IgG4. It specifically reacts with baboon IgG4 via ELISA. There is no cross reactivity with other primate IgG4 subtypes. Immunizing mice against a baboon immunoglobulin gives rise to anti-baboon IgG4.

=== Anti-Rhesus ===
The following anti-rhesus antibodies are isotypes of anti-IgG. The isotypes include IgG1 and IgG4. Both [2C6] and [7A8] are subtypes of anti-IgG4.

Anti-Rhesus Antibody Type	Description
Anti-Rhesus IgG1 [3C10.3]	This is a recombinant monoclonal antibody to rhesus IgG1. It specifically reacts with rhesus IgG1 via ELISA. Specificity of anti-rhesus IgG1 to rhesus IgG1 was confirmed through antibody responses to HIV-1 vaccine in rhesus macaques.
Anti-Rhesus IgG4 [2C6]	This is a recombinant monoclonal antibody to rhesus IgG4. It specifically reacts with rhesus IgG4 via ELISA. There is no cross reactivity with other primate IgG4 subtypes. Immunizing mice against a rhesus immunoglobulin gives rise to anti-rhesus IgG4.
Anti-Rhesus IgG4 [7A8]	This is a recombinant monoclonal antibody to rhesus IgG4. It specifically reacts with rhesus IgG4 via ELISA. Specificity of anti-rhesus IgG4 to rhesus IgG1 was confirmed through antibody responses to HIV-1 vaccine in rhesus macaques.

=== Anti-Pan-Primate ===
Anti-Pan-Primate Antibody Type	Description
Anti-Pan-Primate IgG [8F1]	This is a recombinant monoclonal antibody to pan-primate IgG. This antibody reacts with most primate IgG antibodies, including human IgG. In a research setting the antibody has been used via ELISA to count IgG in supernatants from lung and lymph node tissues from cynomolgus macaques.

=== Anti-Marmoset ===
Anti-Marmoset Antibody Type	Description
Anti-Marmoset IgG [4H12]	This is a recombinant monoclonal antibody to marmoset-IgG. The antibody minimally reacts with IgG antibodies from other primate species. The specificity of the antibody was confirmed via ELISA.

It is critical to note that these are not the only anti-non-human immunoglobulin antibodies. These are examples of the most common anti-immunoglobulin antibodies used in current NHP research.

== Clinical Applications ==
Recombinant monoclonal anti-immunoglobulin antibodies have various clinical applications that include diagnosis, disease treatment, and research. The most practical use for anti-immunoglobulin antibodies is in diagnostic tests. Assays use anti-immunoglobulin antibodies to detect immune responses in cancer patients, autoimmune therapy drug developments, infectious disease studies, and vaccine trials. The most current application of anti-immunoglobulin antibodies is in the development of asthma treatments and COVID-19 detection.

Anti-immunoglobulin IgE antibodies are currently being used in asthma treatment medications for severe cases. The treatment focuses on bronchial asthma which is defined as the chronic inflammation of airways. Symptoms include wheezing, dyspnea, and cough. The use of anti-immunoglobulin E antibodies is reserved for severe cases of asthma that are related to allergic reactions. Long term treatment plans for severe asthma come in four steps, with use of an anti-IgE antibody being used in the fourth step in conjunction with an inhaled corticosteroid. The use of anti-IgE antibodies in treatment is only effective in patients with a serum total IgE value within 30-1500 IU/mL. Omalizumab is the drug therapy used to deliver the anti-immunoglobulin E antibodies. Omalizumab is a human anti-IgE monoclonal antibody. It blocks IgE-mediated reactions and reduces asthma symptoms by binding to free IgE antibodies in serum. The drug is delivered every 2-4 weeks depending on severity of the patient. Effectiveness of the drug is predictive of higher eosinophil counts, higher serum periostin counts, and higher fractional exhaled nitric oxide levels. The treatment is effective in about 60% of patients.

With the spread of COVID-19 worldwide, it became vital for researchers to develop an efficient method to detect COVID-19 in PCR tests. In 2021 researchers developed an assay to detect both viral RNA and human antibodies from one clinical sample. The assay is known as OPIPE, a one-pot pre-coated interface proximity extension assay. The assay recognizes antibodies by using a pre-coated antigen interface and a pair of anti-antibodies labeled with oligosaccharides. The recognized antibodies extend to double stranded DNA templates to initiate the final steps of the PCR. The serum detection level is 100 fg/mL for the anti-SARS-CoV-2 antibody and 10 copies/μL for viral DNA. The success of the method to co-detect viral RNA and human antibodies is imperative in finding cheaper alternatives for COVID-19 infection identifications.
