= Hemosiderinuria =

Presence of hemosiderin in urine

Hemosiderinuria (syn. haemosiderinuria) is the presence of hemosiderin in urine. It is often the result of chronic intravascular hemolysis, in which hemoglobin is released from red blood cells into the bloodstream in excess of the binding capacity of haptoglobin. The function of haptoglobin is to bind to circulating hemoglobin, thereby reducing renal excretion of hemoglobin and preventing injury to kidney tubules. The excess hemoglobin that is not bound to haptoglobin is filtered by the kidneys and reabsorbed in the proximal convoluted tubule, where the iron portion is removed and stored in ferritin or hemosiderin. The tubule cells of the proximal tubule become damaged, slough off with the hemosiderin and are excreted into the urine, producing a "brownish" color. It is usually seen three to four days after the onset of hemolytic conditions.

Hemoglobinuria is another indicator of intravascular hemolysis, but disappears more quickly than hemosiderin, which can remain in the urine for several weeks; therefore, hemosiderinuria is a better marker for intravascular hemolysis.
