= Acrocyanosis =

Persistent blue or cyanotic discoloration of the extremities

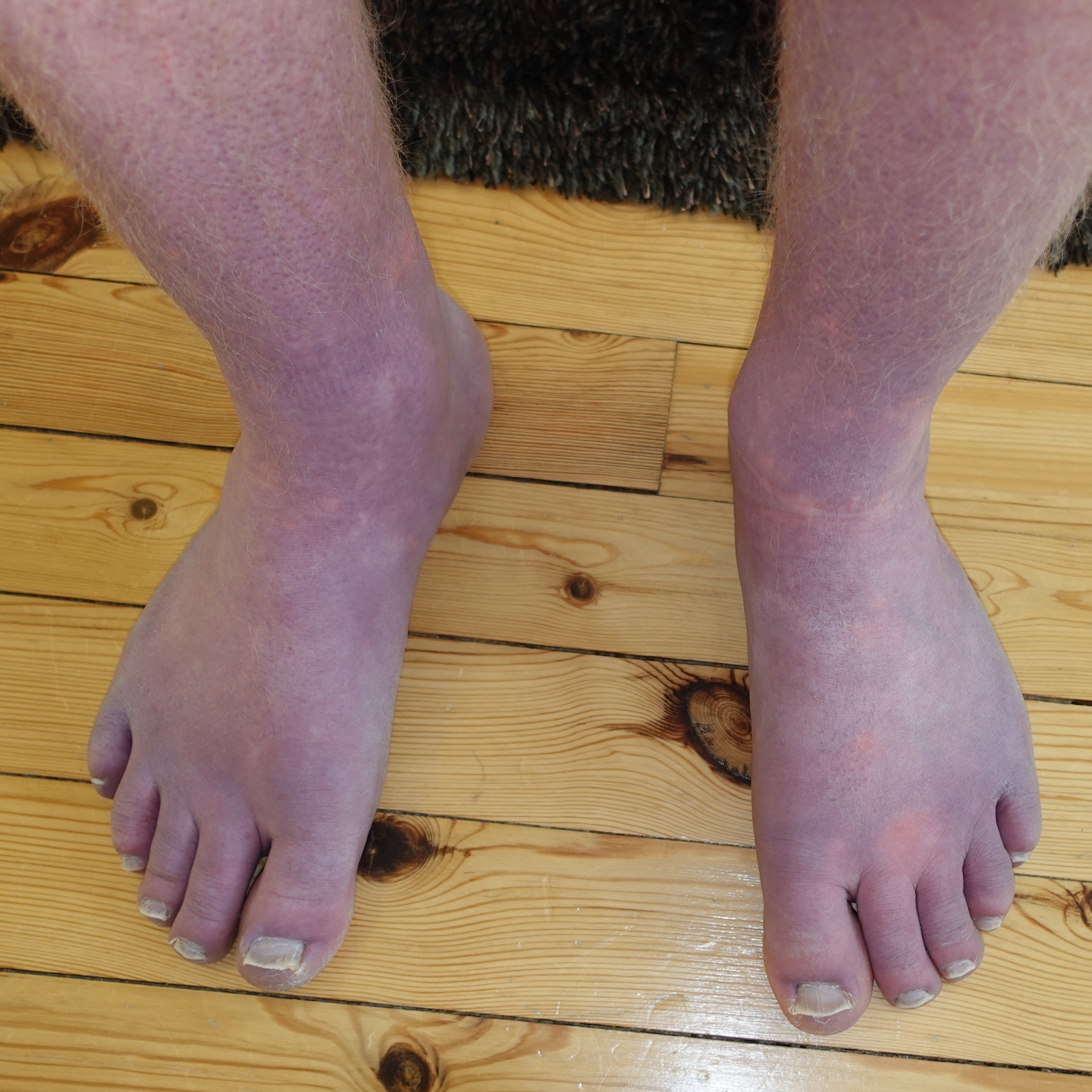
- Dependent acrocyanosis in Postural orthostatic tachycardia syndrome patient
- Specialty: Cardiology

Acrocyanosis is persistent blue or cyanotic discoloration of the extremities, most commonly occurring in the hands, although it also occurs in the feet and distal parts of the face. Although described over 100 years ago and not uncommon in practice, the nature of this phenomenon is still uncertain. The very term "acrocyanosis" is often applied inappropriately in cases when blue discoloration of the hands, feet, or parts of the face is noted. The principal (primary) form of acrocyanosis is that of a benign cosmetic condition, sometimes caused by a relatively benign neurohormonal disorder. Regardless of its cause, the benign form typically does not require medical treatment. A medical emergency would ensue if the extremities experience prolonged periods of exposure to the cold, particularly in children and patients with poor general health. However, frostbite differs from acrocyanosis because pain (via thermal nociceptors) often accompanies the former condition, while the latter is very rarely associated with pain. There are also a number of other conditions that affect hands, feet, and parts of the face with associated skin color changes that need to be differentiated from acrocyanosis: Raynaud phenomenon, pernio, acrorygosis, erythromelalgia, and blue finger syndrome. The diagnosis may be challenging in some cases, especially when these syndromes co-exist.

Acrocyanosis may be a sign of a more serious medical problem, such as connective tissue diseases and diseases associated with central cyanosis. Other causative conditions include infections, toxicities, antiphospholipid syndrome, cryoglobulinemia, neoplasms. In these cases, the observed cutaneous changes are known as "secondary acrocyanosis". They may have a less symmetric distribution and may be associated with pain and tissue loss.

== Signs and symptoms ==
Acrocyanosis is characterized by peripheral cyanosis: persistent cyanosis of the hands, feet, knees, or face. The extremities often are cold and clammy and may exhibit some swelling (especially in warmer weather). The palms and soles exhibit a wide range of sweating from moderately moist to profuse, but all peripheral pulses should have normal rate, rhythm, and quality. Exposure to cold temperatures worsens the cyanosis, while it often improves on warming. Aside from the color changes, patients normally are asymptomatic and therefore there is usually no associated pain. The most common sign, discoloration, usually is what prompts patients to seek medical care.

== Pathophysiology ==
The precise mechanism of acrocyanosis is not known. The current line of thinking goes that vasospasms in the cutaneous arteries and arterioles produce cyanotic discoloration, while compensatory dilatation in the postcapillary venules causes sweating. Arteriovenous subpapillary plexus shunting also occurs. Persistent vasoconstriction at the precapillary sphincter creates a local hypoxic environment, thus releasing adenosine into the capillary bed. Vasospasms force adenosine to enter the capillary bed, where it vasodilates the postcapillary venules. Such differences in vessel tone create a countercurrent exchange system that attempts to retain heat. Profuse sweating would then be caused by an overwhelmed countercurrent exchange system. In addition to adenosine, other hormones may contribute to acrocyanosis such as increase blood levels of serotonin. This would seem to support case studies reporting acrocyanosis as an unusual side effect for pediatric patients taking tricyclic antidepressants, as these medications can inhibit the reuptake of serotonin and thus increase their blood concentrations. Acrocyanosis has been reported in association with many other medications and substances.

== Diagnosis ==
Acrocyanosis is diagnosed clinically, based on a medical history and physical examination; laboratory studies or imaging studies are not necessary. The normal peripheral pulses rule out peripheral arterial occlusive disease, where arterial narrowing limits blood flow to the extremities. Pulse oximetry will show a normal oxygen saturation. Unlike the closely related Raynaud's phenomenon, cyanosis is continually persistent. In addition, there is usually no associated trophic skin changes, localized pain, or ulcerations. Capillaroscopy and other laboratory methods may be helpful but only complement clinical diagnosis in unclear cases, especially when connective tissue disorders may be present.

== Treatment ==
There is no standard medical or surgical treatment for acrocyanosis, and treatment, other than reassurance and avoidance of cold, is usually unnecessary. The patient is reassured that no serious illness is present. A sympathectomy would alleviate the cyanosis by disrupting the fibers of the sympathetic nervous system to the area. However, such an extreme procedure would rarely be appropriate. Treatment with vasoactive drugs is not recommended but traditionally is mentioned as optional. However, there is little, if any, empirical evidence that vasoactive drugs (α-adrenergic blocking agents or calcium channel blockers) are effective.

== Prognosis ==
While there is no cure for acrocyanosis, patients otherwise have excellent prognosis. Unless acrocyanosis results from another condition (e.g. malignancy, antiphospholipid syndrome, atherosclerosis, acute ischemic limb, bacterial endocarditis), there is no associated increased risk of disease or death, and there are no known complications. Aside from the discoloration, there are no other symptoms: no pain, and no loss of function. Patients can expect to lead normal lives. In secondary acrocyanosis treatment of the primary condition defines outcomes.

== Epidemiology ==
Although there is no definitive reporting on its incidence, acrocyanosis shows prevalence in children and young adults than in patients thirty years of age or older. Epidemiological data suggests that cold climate, outdoor occupation, and low body mass index are significant risk factors for developing acrocyanosis. As expected, acrocyanosis would be more prevalent in women than in men due to differences in BMI. However, the incidence rate of acrocyanosis often decreases with increasing age, regardless of regional climate. It completely resolves in many women after menopause implying significant hormonal influences. There is some evidence that many cases of idiopathic acrocyanosis are in some way related to a disorder of estrogen, or aromatase.

Around 50% of patients with POTS experience acrocyanosis of their legs while standing still.

== In newborns ==
Acrocyanosis is common initially after delivery in preterm and full term newborns. Intervention is typically not required as it is seen as a normal finding. Acrocyanosis can also return in a newborn if a baby is cold, such as after a bath, and is considered normal as well.

== See also ==
- Pernio (Chilblains)
- Cyanosis
- Peripheral artery occlusive disease
- Raynaud's phenomenon
- Postural orthostatic tachycardia syndrome
