= Warm antibody autoimmune hemolytic anemia =

- Other names: WAIHA
- Specialty: Hematology

Warm antibody autoimmune hemolytic anemia (WAIHA) is the most common form of autoimmune haemolytic anemia. About half of the cases are of unknown cause, with the other half attributable to a predisposing condition or medications being taken. Contrary to cold autoimmune hemolytic anemia (e.g., cold agglutinin disease and paroxysmal cold hemoglobinuria) which happens in cold temperature (28–31 °C), WAIHA happens at body temperature.

== Causes ==
AIHA may be:

- Idiopathic, that is, without any known cause
- Secondary to another disease, such as an antecedent upper respiratory tract infection, systemic lupus erythematosus or a malignancy, such as chronic lymphocytic leukemia (CLL)

=== Medications ===
- Several medications have been associated with the development of warm AIHA. These medications include quinidine, nonsteroidal anti-inflammatory drugs (NSAIDs), alpha methyldopa, and antibiotics such as penicillins, cephalosporins (such as ceftriaxone and cefotetan), and ciprofloxacin.

== Pathophysiology ==
The most common antibody isotype involved in warm antibody AIHA is IgG, though sometimes IgA is found. The IgG antibodies attach to a red blood cell, leaving their F_{C} portion exposed with maximal reactivity at 37 °C (versus cold antibody induced hemolytic anemia whose antibodies only bind red blood cells at low body temperatures, typically 28–31 °C). The F_{C} region is recognized and grabbed onto by F_{C} receptors found on monocytes and macrophages in the spleen. These cells will pick off portions of the red cell membrane, almost as if they are taking a bite. The loss of membrane causes the red blood cells to become spherocytes. Spherocytes are not as flexible as normal RBCs and will be singled-out for destruction in the red pulp of the spleen as well as other portions of the reticuloendothelial system. The red blood cells trapped in the spleen cause the spleen to enlarge, leading to the splenomegaly often seen in these patients.

There are two models for this: the hapten model and the autoantibody model. The hapten model proposes that certain drugs, especially penicillin and cephalosporins, will bind to certain proteins on the red cell membrane and act as haptens (small molecules that can elicit an immune response only when attached to a large carrier such as a protein; the carrier may be one that also does not elicit an immune response by itself). Antibodies are created against the protein-drug complex, leading to the destructive sequence described above. The autoantibody model proposes that, through a mechanism not yet understood, certain drugs will cause antibodies to be made against red blood cells which again leads to the same destructive sequence. It is possible for it to occur in an immunocompromised patient.

== Diagnosis ==
Diagnosis is made by a positive direct Coombs test, other lab tests, and clinical examination and history. The direct Coombs test looks for antibodies attached to the surface of red blood cells.

=== Clinical findings ===
Laboratory findings include severe anemia, normal MCV (mean corpuscular volume), and hyperbilirubinemia (from increased red cell destruction) that can be of the conjugated or unconjugated type.

== Treatment ==
Corticosteroids and immunoglobulins are two commonly used treatments for warm antibody AIHA. Initial medical treatment consists of prednisone. If ineffective, splenectomy should be considered.If refractory to both these therapies, other options include rituximab, danazol, cyclosphosphamide, azathioprine, or ciclosporin. High-dose intravenous immune globulin may be effective in controlling hemolysis, but the benefit is short lived (1–4 weeks), and the therapy is very expensive.

== See also ==
- List of circulatory system conditions
