= Lymphoproliferative disorders =

Excessive production of lymphocytes by the immune system

- Specialty: Hematology and oncology

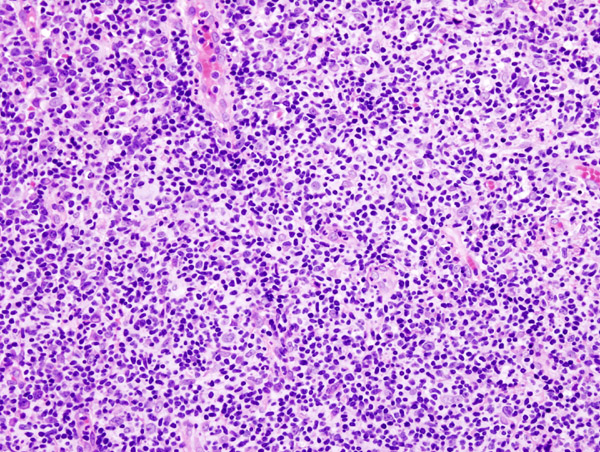
Histopathology of diffuse large B-cell lymphoma occurring in the tonsil. H&E stain.

Lymphoproliferative disorders (LPDs) refer to a specific class of diagnoses, comprising a group of several conditions, in which lymphocytes are produced in excessive quantities. These disorders primarily present in patients who have a compromised immune system. Due to this factor, there are instances of these conditions being equated with "immunoproliferative disorders"; although, in terms of nomenclature, lymphoproliferative disorders are a subclass of immunoproliferative disorders—along with hypergammaglobulinemia and paraproteinemias.

== Lymphoproliferative disorders (examples) ==
- Follicular lymphoma
- Chronic lymphocytic leukemia
- Acute lymphoblastic leukemia
- Hairy cell leukemia
- Hemophagocytic lymphohistiocytosis (HLH)
- B-cell lymphomas
- T-cell lymphomas
- Multiple myeloma
- Waldenström's macroglobulinemia
- Wiskott–Aldrich syndrome
- Langerhans cell histiocytosis (LCH)
- Lymphocyte-variant hypereosinophilia
- Pityriasis lichenoides (PL, PLC, PLVA)
- Post-transplant lymphoproliferative disorder
- Autoimmune lymphoproliferative syndrome (ALPS)
- Lymphoid interstitial pneumonia
- Epstein–Barr virus-associated lymphoproliferative diseases
- Castleman disease
- X-linked lymphoproliferative disease
- Primary cutaneous acral CD8 positive T cell lymphoproliferative disorder

== Types ==
Lymphoproliferative disorders are a set of disorders characterized by the abnormal proliferation of lymphocytes into a monoclonal lymphocytosis. The two major types of lymphocytes are B cells and T cells, which are derived from pluripotent hematopoietic stem cells in the bone marrow. Individuals who have some sort of dysfunction with their immune system are susceptible to develop a lymphoproliferative disorder because when any of the numerous control points of the immune system become dysfunctional, immunodeficiency or deregulation of lymphocytes is more likely to occur. There are several inherited gene mutations that have been identified to cause lymphoproliferative disorders; however, there are also acquired and iatrogenic causes.

=== X-linked Lymphoproliferative disorder ===
A mutation on the X chromosome is associated with a T cell and natural killer cell lymphoproliferative disorder.

=== Autoimmune lymphoproliferative disorder ===
Some children with autoimmune lymphoproliferative disorders are heterozygous for a mutation in the gene that codes for the Fas receptor, which is located on the long arm of chromosome 10 at position 24.1, denoted 10q24.1. This gene is member 6 of the TNF-receptor superfamily (TNFRSF6). The Fas receptor contains a death domain and has been shown to play a central role in the physiological regulation of programmed cell death. Normally, stimulation of recently activated T cells by antigen leads to coexpression of Fas and Fas receptor on the T cell surface. The engagement of Fas by Fas receptor results in apoptosis of the cell and is important for eliminating T cells that are repeatedly stimulated by antigens. As a result of the mutation in the Fas receptor gene, there is no recognition of Fas by Fas receptor, leading to a primitive population of T cells that proliferates in an uncontrolled manner.

=== Other inherited causes ===
Boys with X-linked immunodeficiency syndrome are at a higher risk of mortality associated with Epstein–Barr virus infections, and are predisposed to develop a lymphoproliferative disorder or lymphoma.

Children with common variable immunodeficiency (CVID) are also at a higher risk of developing a lymphoproliferative disorder.

Some disorders that predispose a person to lymphoproliferative disorders are severe combined immunodeficiency (SCID), Chédiak–Higashi syndrome, Wiskott–Aldrich syndrome (an X-linked recessive disorder), and ataxia–telangiectasia.

Even though ataxia telangiectasia is an autosomal recessive disorder, people who are heterozygotes for this still have an increased risk of developing a lymphoproliferative disorder.

=== Acquired causes ===
Viral infection is a very common cause of lymphoproliferative disorders. In children, the most common is believed to be congenital HIV infection because it is highly associated with acquired immunodeficiency, which often leads to lymphoproliferative disorders.

=== Iatrogenic causes ===
There are many lymphoproliferative disorders that are associated with organ transplantation and immunosuppressant therapies. In most reported cases, these cause B cell lymphoproliferative disorders; however, some T cell variations have been described. The T cell variations are usually caused by the prolonged use of T cell suppressant drugs, such as sirolimus, tacrolimus, or ciclosporin. The Epstein-Barr virus, which infects >90% of the world population, is also a common cause of these disorders, being responsible for a wide range of non-malignant, pre-malignant, and malignant Epstein-Barr virus-associated lymphoproliferative diseases.

== See also ==
- Evans syndrome
- Leukaemia
- Lymphoma
- Lymphocytosis
- Myeloma
- Myeloproliferative disease
