= Normocytic anemia =

Type of anemia

Normocytic anemia is a type of anemia and is a common issue that occurs for people typically over 85 years old. Its prevalence increases with age, reaching 44 percent in men older than 85 years. The most common type of normocytic anemia is anemia of chronic disease.

== Classification ==
An anemia is normocytic when the red blood cells (RBCs) are of normal size. RBCs are normocytic when the mean corpuscular volume (MCV) is between 80 and 100 femtolitres (fL), which is within the normal and expected range. However, the hematocrit and hemoglobin are decreased. In contrast, microcytic anemias are defined as an anemia with a mean corpuscular volume (MCV) less than 80 fL and macrocytic anemias have a mean corpuscular volume over 100 fL.

== Causes ==
The issue is thought of as representing any of the following:

- An acute loss of blood of a substantial volume;
- a decreased production of normal-sized red blood cells (e.g., anemia of chronic disease, aplastic anemia);
- an increased production of HbS as seen in sickle cell disease (not sickle cell trait);
- an increased destruction or loss of red blood cells (e.g., hemolysis, posthemorrhagic anemia, hypersplenism);
- an uncompensated increase in plasma volume (e.g., pregnancy, fluid overload);
- a B2 (riboflavin) deficiency
- a B6 (pyridoxine) deficiency
- or a mixture of conditions producing microcytic and macrocytic anemia.

Blood loss, suppressed production of RBCs or hemolysis represent most cases of normocytic anemia. In blood loss, morphologic findings are generally unremarkable, except after 12 to 24 hrs where polychromasia appears. For reduced production of RBCs, like with low erythropoietin, the RBC morphology is unremarkable. Patients with disordered RBC production, e.g. myelodysplastic syndrome, may have a dual population of elliptocytes, teardrop cells, or other poikilocytes as well as a nucleated RBCs. Hemolysis will often demonstrate poikilocytes specific to a cause or mechanism, e.g. bite cells and/or blister cells for oxidative hemolysis, acanthocytes for pyruvate kinase deficiency or McLeod phenotype, sickle cells for sickle cell anemia, spherocytes for immune-mediated hemolysis or hereditary spherocytosis, elliptocytosis for iron deficiency or hereditary elliptocytosis and schistocytes for intravascular hemolysis. Many hemolytic anemias show multiple poikilocytes such as G6PD deficiency, which may show blister and bites cells as well as shistocytes. Neonatal hemolysis may not follow the classic patterns as in adults.

== Diagnosis ==
To aid with determining the underlying cause of the normocytic anemia, a lab test is done on reticulocyte count. A reticulocyte count that is high, normal or low will aid with the classification process. A high reticulocyte count signifies that bone marrow processes are normal. A low reticulocyte count would signify there is a problem at the level of the bone marrow, which produce the stem cells. Acute blood loss would result in a high reticulocyte count, as bone marrow processes are normal and the bone marrow responds accordingly to the body's need for blood.

== Treatment ==
Treatment will depend on the cause of the normocytic anemia. Treatment for anemia due to chronic diseases, such as kidney disease, focus on healing the primary condition first. Dietary foods or supplements should be added if anemia is due to a lack of a particular vitamin. Erythropoietin may be considered if anemia is severe. Erythropoietin will stimulate the bone marrow to make more blood cells.
