= Neuroacanthocytosis =

Group of neurological genetic diseases involving misshapen spiky red blood cells

- Specialty: Neurology, medical genetics
- Frequency: 0.0001%

Neuroacanthocytosis is a label applied to several genetic neurological conditions in which the blood contains misshapen, spiculated red blood cells called acanthocytes.

The 'core' neuroacanthocytosis syndromes, in which acanthocytes are a typical feature, are chorea acanthocytosis and McLeod syndrome. Acanthocytes are seen less frequently in other conditions including Huntington's disease-like syndrome 2 (HDL2) and pantothenate kinase-associated neurodegeneration (PKAN).

The neuroacanthocytosis syndromes are caused by a range of genetic mutations and produce a variety of clinical features but primarily produce neurodegeneration of the brain, specifically the basal ganglia.

The diseases are hereditary but rare.

== Acanthocytes ==
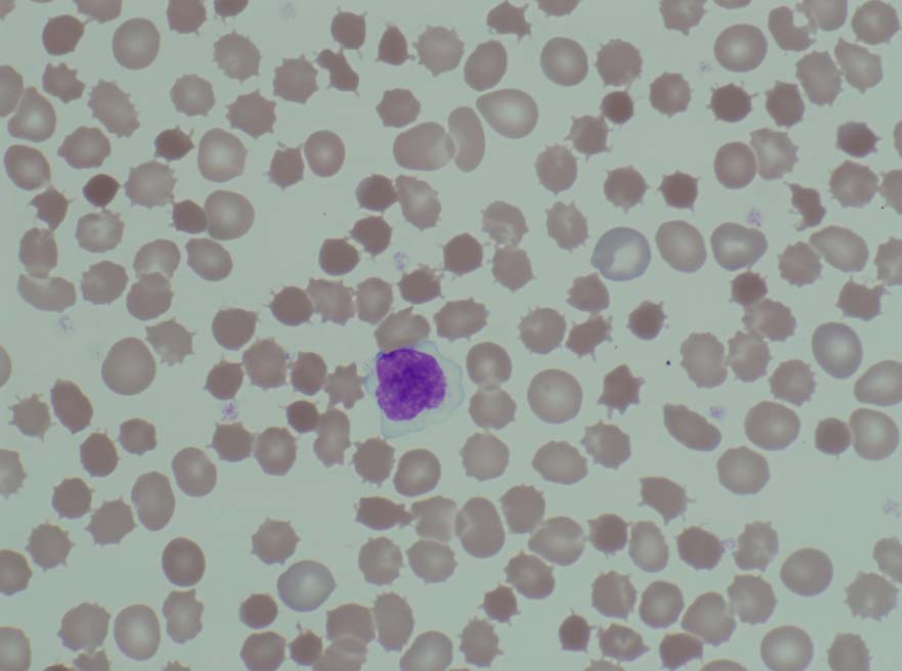
Acanthocytosis in a patient with abetalipoproteinemia

The hallmark of the neuroacanthocytosis syndromes is the presence of acanthocytes in peripheral blood. Acanthocytosis originated from the Greek word acantha, meaning thorn. Acanthocytes are spiculated red blood cells and can be caused by altered distribution of membrane lipids or membrane protein/skeleton abnormalities. In neuroacanthocytosis, acanthocytes are caused by protein but not lipid membrane abnormalities

== Signs and symptoms ==
The 'core' neuroacanthocytosis syndromes are chorea acanthocytosis and McLeod syndrome. Acanthocytes are nearly always present in these conditions and they share common clinical features. Some of these features are also seen in the other neurological syndromes associated with neuroacanthocytosis.

A common feature of the core syndromes is chorea: involuntary dance-like movements. In neuroacanthocytosis, this is particularly prominent in the face and mouth which can cause difficulties with speech and eating. These movements are usually abrupt and irregular and present during both rest and sleep.

Individuals with neuroacanthocytosis also often have parkinsonism, the uncontrolled slowness of movements, and dystonia, abnormal body postures. Many affected individuals also have cognitive (intellectual) impairment and psychiatric symptoms such as anxiety, paranoia, depression, obsessive behavior, and pronounced emotional instability. Seizures may also be a symptom of neuroacanthocytosis.

Onset differs between individual neuroacanthocytosis syndromes but is usually between ages 20 and 40. Affected individuals usually live for 10–20 years after onset.

== Core neuroacanthocytosis syndromes ==
Core neuroacanthocytosis syndromes
Disease	Mutation	Inheritance
Chorea acanthocytosis	VPS13A (CHAC gene)	autosomal recessive
McLeod syndrome	XK gene on X-chromosome	X-linked recessive

=== Chorea acanthocytosis ===
Chorea acanthocytosis is an autosomal recessive disorder caused by mutations in the VPS13A, also called CHAC, on chromosome 9q21. The gene encodes the protein Vacuolar protein sorting-associated protein 13A, also known as chorein. The protein's function is unknown.

Chorea acanthocytosis is characterised by dystonia, chorea and progressive cognitive, behavioural changes and seizures. Strikingly, many people with chorea acanthocytosis uncontrollably bite their tongue, lips, and the inside of the mouth. Eye movement abnormalities are also seen.

There are about 500–1,000 cases of chorea acanthocytosis worldwide and it is not specific to any particular ethnic group.

=== McLeod syndrome ===
McLeod syndrome is an X-linked recessive disorder caused by mutations in the XK gene encoding the Kx blood type antigen, one of the Kell antigens.

Like the other neuroacanthocytosis syndromes, McLeod syndrome causes movement disorder, cognitive impairment and psychiatric symptoms. The particular features of McLeod syndrome are heart problems such as arrhythmia and dilated cardiomyopathy (enlarged heart).

McLeod syndrome is very rare. There are approximately 150 cases of McLeod syndrome worldwide. Because of its X-linked mode of inheritance, it is much more prevalent in males.

== Other neurological conditions causing acanthocytosis ==
Many other neurological conditions are associated with acanthocytosis but are not considered 'core' acanthocytosis syndromes. The commonest are:

- Pantothenate kinase-associated neurodegeneration, an autosomal recessive condition caused by mutations in PANK2.
- Huntington's disease-like syndrome type 2, an autosomal dominant condition caused by mutations in JPH3 that closely resembles Huntington's disease.
- Bassen-Kornzweig disease, or Bassen-Kornzweig Syndrome (see also History).
- Levine-Critchley syndrome (see History).
- Paroxysmal movement disorders associated with GLUT1 mutations.
- Familial acanthocytosis with paroxysmal exertion-induced dyskinesias and epilepsy (FAPED).
- Some cases of mitochondrial disease.

== Management ==
Currently, no treatment slows the neurodegeneration in any of the neuroacanthocytosis disorders. Medication may be administered to decrease the involuntary movements produced by these syndromes. Antipsychotics are used to block dopamine, anticonvulsants treat seizures and botulinum toxin injections may control dystonia. Patients usually receive speech, occupational and physical therapies to help with the complications associated with movement. Sometimes, physicians will prescribe antidepressants for the psychological problems that accompany neuroacanthocytosis. Some success has been reported with deep brain stimulation.

Mouthguards and other physical protective devices may be useful in preventing damage to the lips and tongue due to the orofacial chorea and dystonia typical of chorea acanthocytosis.

== History ==
Neuroacanthocytosis was first identified in 1950 as Bassen-Kornzweig disease, or Bassen-Kornzweig Syndrome, a rare, autosomal recessive, childhood-onset disorder in which the body fails to produce chylomicrons, low density lipoprotein (LDL) and very low density lipoprotein (VLDL). Symptoms include ataxia, peripheral neuropathy, retinitis pigmentosa and other forms of nerve dysfunction. It was first noted by the North American physician Frank Bassen, who later partnered with the ophthalmologist Abraham Kornzweig to identify and describe causes and symptoms of the disease. Affected children appear normal at birth but usually fail to thrive during their first year.

A second form of neuroacanthocytosis, Levine-Critchley syndrome, was discovered by the American internist Irvine M. Levine in 1960 and reported in Neurology in 1964, and again in 1968. Subsequently, similar symptoms were identified and described by the British neurologist MacDonald Critchley in 1968. In both cases, the physicians described a hereditary syndrome that combined acanthocytosis with neurological peculiarities but normal serum lipoprotein. Specific symptoms included tics, grimacing, movement disorders, difficulty swallowing, poor coordination, hyporeflexia, chorea, and seizures. Patients often mutilated their tongues, lips, and cheeks. The diseases appeared in both sexes, and were usually diagnosed in infancy.

== Research ==
Research is underway worldwide to increase scientific understanding of these disorders as well to identify prevention and treatment methods. Known genetic mutations provide a basis for studying some of the conditions.
