= KX blood-group antigen family =

Family of transport proteins

The KX Blood-group Antigen (KXA) Family (TC# 2.A.112) consists of transport proteins that are part of the TOG superfamily. The KX gene codes for a novel protein with characteristics of membrane transporters that has been proposed to be a Na^{+} -dependent neutral amine and/or oligopeptide transporter. It is predicted to be 444 amino acyl residues in length and exhibits 10 putative transmembrane α-helical segments. The KX blood group antigen mRNA expression pattern correlates with McLeod syndrome.

== Structure ==
Two covalently linked proteins, Kell and XK, constitute the Kell blood group system. Kell, a 93-Kd type II glycoprotein, is highly polymorphic and carries all but one of the known Kell antigens, and XK, which traverses the membrane ten times, carries a single antigen, the ubiquitous Kx.

== Transport Reaction ==
The generalized reactions proposed to be catalyzed by KXA family members are:

1) Amino acid or peptide (out) → Amino acid or peptide (in)
2) Phospholipid (inner monolayer of the plasma membrane) → Phospholipid (outer monolayer of the plasma membrane)

== McLeod Syndrome ==
The X-linked McLeod syndrome is defined by absent Kx red blood cell antigen and weak expression of Kell antigens. Most carriers of this McLeod blood group phenotype have acanthocytosis and elevated serum creatine kinase levels and are prone to develop a severe neurological disorder resembling Huntington's disease. Onset of neurological symptoms ranges between 25 and 60 years, and the penetrance of the disorder appears to be high. Additional symptoms of the McLeod neuroacanthocytosis syndrome that warrant therapeutic and diagnostic considerations include generalized seizures, neuromuscular symptoms leading to weakness and atrophy, and cardiopathy mainly manifesting with atrial fibrillation, malignant arrhythmias and dilated cardiomyopathy.

== Apoptosis ==
A classic feature of apoptotic cells is the cell-surface exposure of phosphatidylserine (PtdSer) as an 'eat me' signal for engulfment. Suzuki et al. showed that the Xk-family protein Xkr8 mediates PtdSer exposure in response to apoptotic stimuli. Mouse Xkr8(-/-) cells or human cancer cells in which Xkr8 expression was repressed by hypermethylation failed to expose PtdSer during apoptosis and were inefficiently engulfed by phagocytes. Xkr8 was activated directly by caspases and required a caspase-3 cleavage site for its function. CED-8, the only Caenorhabditis elegans Xk-family homolog, also promoted apoptotic PtdSer exposure and cell-corpse engulfment. Thus, Xk-family proteins have evolutionarily conserved roles in promoting the phagocytosis of dying cells by altering the phospholipid distribution in the plasma membrane.

Chen et al. report that CED-8, a Caenorhabditis elegans protein implicated in controlling the kinetics of apoptosis and a homologue of the XK family proteins, is a substrate of the CED-3 caspase. Cleavage of CED-8 by CED-3 activates its proapoptotic function and generates a carboxyl-terminal cleavage product, acCED-8, that promotes PS externalization in apoptotic cells and can induce ectopic PS exposure in living cells. Consistent with its role in promoting PS externalization in apoptotic cells, ced-8 is important for cell corpse engulfment in C. elegans. Thus, there is a link between caspase activation and PS externalization, which triggers phagocytosis of apoptotic cells.
