= Drug-induced nonautoimmune hemolytic anemia =

- Specialty: Hematology

Drug-induced nonautoimmune hemolytic anemia is a uncommon cause of hemolytic anemia. In drug-induced nonautoimmune hemolytic anemia, red blood cells (RBC) are destroyed from various non-immune mechanisms such as direct oxidative stress from certain drugs. This is in contrast to drug-induced autoimmune hemolytic anemia where certain drugs result in the formation of antibodies against RBCs, resulting in hemolysis.

Since drug-induced nonautoimmune hemolytic anemia often occurs due to oxidative mechanisms, it is commonly seen in those with antioxidant enzyme deficiencies such as in Glucose-6-phosphate dehydrogenase deficiency or Hemoglobin H disease, often in response to drugs such as primaquine or dapsone. Drug-induced nonautoimmune hemolytic anemia can also occur due to other various mechanisms that damage RBCs such as in drug induced thrombotic microangiopathy.

Individuals with drug-induced nonautoimmune hemolytic anemia often have symptoms of fatigue, pallor, shortness of breath, and abdominal pain. Treatment involves stopping of the suspected drug and supportive measures such as hydration and possible transfusions.

== Signs and symptoms ==
The initial signs and symptoms of drug-induced nonautoimmune hemolytic anemia can initially present suddenly after exposure to a drug or can begin to present days to weeks after exposure. Signs and symptoms can range from mild to severe. Drug-induced nonautoimmune hemolytic anemia can present with symptoms of anemia such as pallor, fatigue, dizziness, shortness of breath, increased heart rate, or fainting. It can also present with signs and symptoms of hemolysis including abdominal pain, back pain, jaundice, or dark or red urine. More severe complications include shock, disseminated intravascular coagulation, acute renal failure, or death.

== Causes ==
Many drugs have been implicated in causing oxidative damage to RBCs, which may cause a hemolytic anemia especially if these drugs are used in individuals with compromised antioxidant mechanisms such as G6PD deficiency or Hemoglobin H disease.

Drugs commonly implicated in causing hemolytic anemia in these individuals include:

- Primaquine
- Dapsone
- Nitrofurantoin
- Rasburicase
- Pegloticase
- Sulfonylureas
- Phenazopyridine

Methemoglobinemia may also uncommonly cause hemolytic anemia and commonly implicated drugs include topical anesthetics such as benzocaine or lidocaine, dapsone, inhaled nitric oxide, rasburicase, chloroquine, sulfasalazine and primaquine. Notably, methylene blue is used as the main treatment for methemoglobinemia, however in G6PD individuals, methylene blue may cause further oxidative stress and that may induce or worsen hemolysis in those with methemoglobinemia.

Hemolytic anemia may also occur secondarily due to thrombotic microangiopathy after exposure to certain drugs. Drug-induced thrombotic microangiopathy can occur due to autoimmune and nonautoimmune mechanisms and commonly implicated causes of nonautoimmune thrombotic microangiopathy various chemotherapeutic drugs, immunosuppressive drugs such as cyclosporine A and tacrolimus, cocaine, or polyethylene oxide (an inert ingredient included with opioids).

== Mechanism ==
Drug-induced nonautoimmune hemolytic anemia can occur due to multiple different mechanisms. A common mechanism is RBC destruction through oxidative injury. Many drugs cause oxidative injury by causing the formation of intracellular oxidizing radicals such as hydrogen peroxide which can interact with hemoglobin and the RBC membrane. These oxidizing radicals can directly damage and crosslink the membrane and intracellular structures of RBCs, cause lipid peroxidation, and promote the formation of Heinz bodies that further impede RBC function.

Those with a deficiency in antioxidant mechanisms such as those with G6PD deficiency or Hemoglobin H disease are particularly susceptible to oxidative injury from drugs. In G6PD deficiency, there is a deficiency of the glucose-6-phosphate dehydrogenase enzyme, which plays a crucial role in the generation of the key antioxidant NADPH. In Hemoglobin H disease, individuals have a loss of three alpha hemoglobin chain genes, leading to the formation of abnormal hemoglobin and also increasing the generation of oxidizing radicals.

Methemoglobinemia is also an uncommon cause of drug-induced nonautoimmune hemolytic anemia. In methemoglobinemia, drug-induced oxidative stress causes the oxidation of the Fe^{2+} ion within the heme molecule in hemoglobin to Fe^{3+}, forming excessive amounts of methemoglobin. Methemoglobin is unable to bind to oxygen causing the individual to be unable to oxygenate their tissues. Continued oxidation and eventual precipitation of methemoglobin can cause the formation of Heinz bodies, which attach to the RBC membrane. These Heinz bodies are then removed by macrophages in the spleen, causing hemolysis and forming bite cells.

Hemolytic anemia can also occur in drug-induced thrombotic microangiopathies (DITMA) where drugs cause platelets to collect together to form platelet collections against the walls of the small vessels of the body. These collections of platelets are referred to as thrombi and shear passing RBCs, causing hemolysis. DITMA can occur due to autoimmune or non-immune mechanisms. In the autoimmune mechanisms, drugs will bind to naturally occurring antibodies that then proceed to bind to platelets, neutrophils, and the walls of the small vessels. Non-immune DITMAs occur generally due to direct tissue injury to the small vessels of the body causing cellular damage and increased accumulation of platelets. This injury may occur after a single dose of a drug or may occur due to a cumulative effect over long term exposure to the drug.

== Diagnosis ==
Drug-induced nonautoimmune hemolytic anemia can occur often suddenly and severely after exposure to a drug and initial work up typically includes a complete blood count and a blood smear. Initial laboratory results will show likely show a decrease in hemoglobin and hematocrit as the initial production of new RBCs in the bone marrow is not quick enough to compensate for the ongoing hemolysis. Reticulocytes may be increased as the bone marrow attempts to increase the production of new RBCs as the hemolytic anemia progresses. Laboratory results may also show signs of hemolysis such as an increase in lactate dehydrogenase and unconjugated bilirubin with a decrease in haptoglobin. A urine dipstick may also be positive for heme and the a urine study may also be positive for hemosiderin. A peripheral blood smear may show abnormally shaped RBCs such as blister or "bite" cells, particularly in those with G6PD deficiency.

Direct antiglobulin testing can be used to differentiate between an autoimmune hemolytic anemia and a nonautoimmune hemolytic anemia. Direct antiglobulin testing helps determine whether the RBCs of the patient are bound by IgG or complement. Since nonautoimmune hemolytic anemia occurs due to mechanisms that do not involve the creation of IgG or complement, direct antiglobulin testing will often be negative.

== Treatment ==
When drug-induced nonautoimmune hemolytic anemia is suspected, stabilizing or life saving treatments should be taken aggressively prior to diagnosis. These include aggressive hydration with IV fluids or transfusion. Treatment with corticosteroids can also be considered. Once diagnosis is established, the suspected drug must be stopped and most patients can be expected to recover over the next few days to weeks.

If drug-induced nonautoimmune hemolytic anemia occurs secondarily to drug induced methemoglobinemia, methylene blue can be used as a first-line therapy. However methylene blue should be avoided in those with a concomitant G6PD deficiency as methylene blue may cause further oxidative hemolysis. In these individuals, Vitamin C is the preferred treatment.

== See also ==
- List of circulatory system conditions
