= Drug-induced autoimmune hemolytic anemia =

Drug-induced autoimmune heamolytic anemia
- Other names: Drug-induced immune hemolytic anemia, DIIHA.
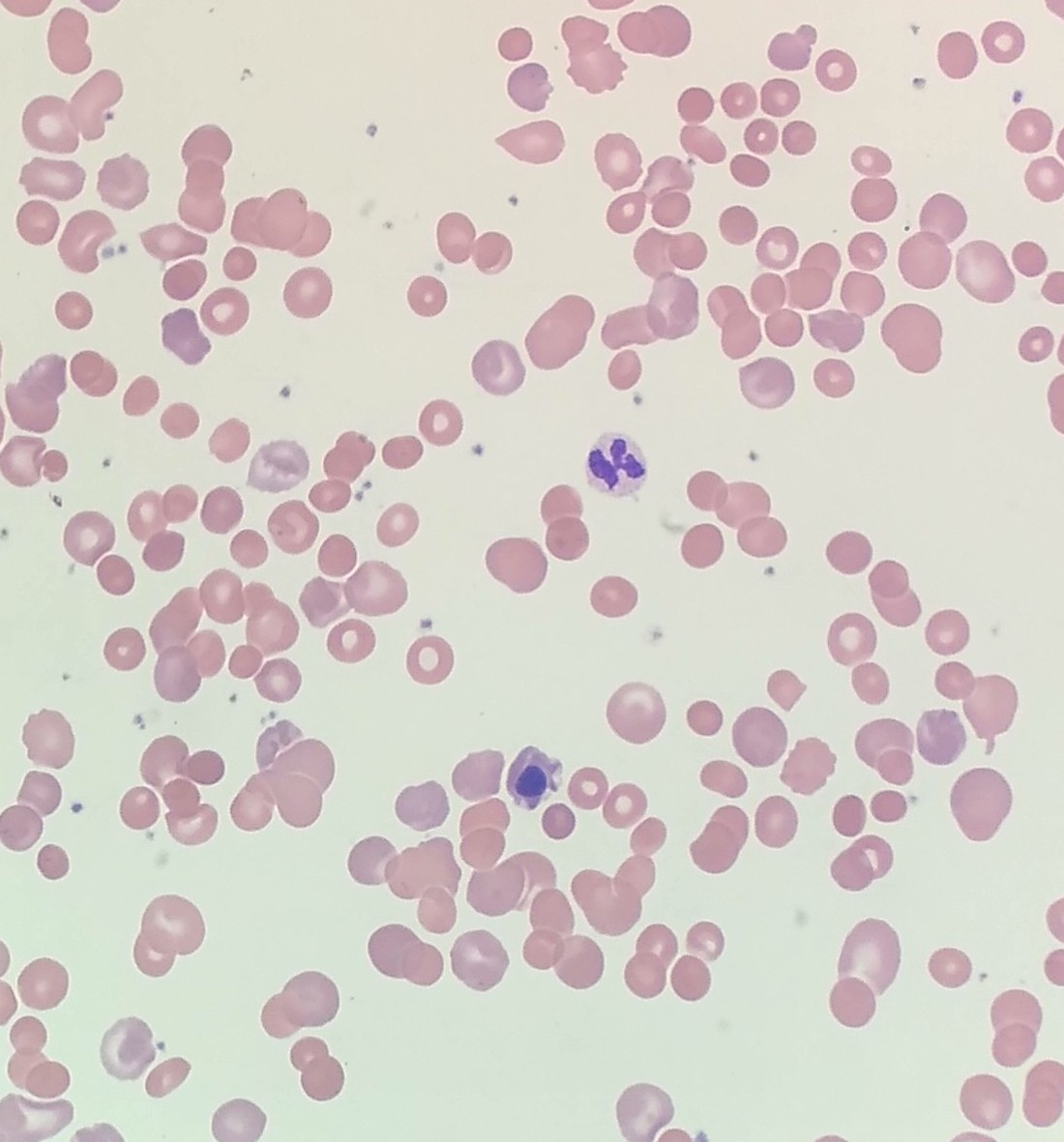
- Blood smear from a patient with warm autoimmune hemolytic anemia showing spherocytes, marked polychromasia and a nucleated red blood cell.
- Specialty: Hematology
- Symptoms: Fatigue, shortness of breath, dizziness, bloody urine, jaundice, weakness, and palpitations
- Complications: Hemolysis, shock, ischemia, acute respiratory distress syndrome, disseminated intravascular coagulation, and acute renal failure.
- Usual onset: Hours to months (various types of hypersensitivities reactions)of the initial drug exposure.
- Causes: Antimicrobials, nonsteroidal anti-inflammatory drugs, antineoplastic drugs, and other drugs.
- Diagnostic method: Blood tests, blood smear, and Direct antiglobulin testing
- Differential diagnosis: Warm antibody autoimmune hemolytic anemia.
- Treatment: Stopping the offending drug, blood transfusions, and thromboprophylaxis.
- Frequency: One to two people per million worldwide.

Drug-induced autoimmune hemolytic anemia, also known as Drug-induced immune hemolytic anemia (DIIHA), is a rare cause of hemolytic anemia. It is difficult to differentiate from other forms of anemia which can lead to delays in diagnosis and treatment. Many different types of antibiotics can cause DIIHA and discontinuing the offending medication is the first line of treatment. DIIHA has is estimated to affect one to two people per million worldwide.

In some cases, a drug can cause the immune system to mistakenly think the body's own red blood cells are dangerous, foreign substances. Antibodies then develop against the red blood cells. The antibodies attach to red blood cells and cause them to break down too early. It is known that more than 150 drugs can cause this type of hemolytic anemia. The list includes:

- Cephalosporins (a class of antibiotics)
- Dapsone
- Levodopa
- Levofloxacin
- Methyldopa
- Nitrofurantoin
- Nonsteroidal anti-inflammatory drugs (NSAIDs) - among them, the commonly used Diclofenac and Ibuprofen
- Phenazopyridine (pyridium)
- Quinidine

== Signs and symptoms ==
Initial symptoms of drug-induced autoimmune hemolytic anemia are typically vague and reflect mild, moderate, or severe anemia. Symptoms of DIIHA can manifest within hours to months of the initial drug exposure. DIIHA ranges in severity from severe intravascular hemolysis to milder presentations of extravascular hemolysis. Common symptoms of DIIHA are fatigue, shortness of breath, dizziness, bloody or dark urine, weakness, and palpitations. DIIHA will occasionally present as hemoglobinuria with chills, however this is quite rare. Patients with DIIHA may appear pale and have jaundice. Hepatomegaly, splenomegaly, and adenopathy have also been observed.When DIIHA is not recognized promptly it can have life-threatening complications such as hemolysis leading to shock, ischemia, acute respiratory distress syndrome, disseminated intravascular coagulation, and acute renal failure.

== Causes ==
As of 2020 over 130 drugs have been reported to cause DIIHA. That number will continue to rise as new drugs are discovered. Antimicrobials are responsible for 42% of DIIHA cases, making them the most common cause. Nonsteroid anti-inflammatory drugs cause about 15% of cases and antineoplastic drugs cause around 11%.

== Mechanism ==
The main mechanism of DIIHA is the development of antibodies. Drug-induced antibodies can be classified into two groups, drug-dependent antibodies and drug-independent autoantibodies. Drug-dependent antibodies are common in DIIHA. They require the offending drug to be present in order to bind and lyse cells.Drug-independent autoantibodies are a less common factor in DIIHA. Drug-independent autoantibodies are found in Drug-induced autoimmune hemolytic anemia because of beta-lactamase inhibitors and platinum-based chemotherapeutics. These autoantibodies can sometimes bind and react to red blood cells even in the absence of whatever drug triggered the anemia.

== Diagnosis ==
Drug-induced autoimmune hemolytic anemia causes a significant drop in hemoglobin and hematocrit. Occasionally DIIHA can present with mild leukocytosis. In its earlier stages patients with DIIHA will have low reticulocytes. As HIIHA progresses reticulocytes increase leading to an elevated mean corpuscular volume. Indirect bilirubin and Lactate dehydrogenase become elevated. LFTs occasionally become elevated. In some cases, a peripheral blood smear may show schistocytes, anisocytosis, polychromasia, or poikilocytosis.

Direct antiglobulin testing is the only way to confirm DIIHA. Direct antiglobulin testing can determine if complement C3 antibody and/or immunoglobulin G is bound to the red blood cell membrane. A positive direct antiglobulin test differentiates immune-mediated hemolytic anemia from a nonimmune-mediated cause. Other situations such as liver disease, post-transfusion or immunoglobulin administration, renal disease, and malignancy can cause a positive direct antiglobulin test. If both complement C3 Antibodies and immunoglobulin G are positive or if only immunoglobulin G is positive then warm antibody autoimmune hemolytic anemia must be considered as a differential diagnosis.

== Treatment ==
An appropriate course of treatment for drug-induced autoimmune hemolytic anemia hasn't yet been established. Once DIIHA has been recognized, the patient must stop whatever drug caused the anemia in order to provide proper treatment. Patients should be given blood transfusions as needed. The use of thromboprophylaxis is encouraged because despite being anemic, patients are often hypercoagulable. Although corticosteroids have been used to treat DIIHA it is difficult to differentiate how much effects corticosteroids actually have on DIIHA.

If drug-independent autoantibodies are involved and stopping the offending agents results in no response then intravenous immunoglobulins and immunosuppressants such as rituximab, azathioprine, cyclophosphamide, cyclosporine, danazol, and mycophenolate can be used. Improvement is typically seen within a few weeks of cessation of the offending drug.

== See also ==
- Drug-induced nonautoimmune hemolytic anemia
- Warm antibody autoimmune hemolytic anemia
- Autoimmune hemolytic anemia
