= Abraham Kornzweig =

American ophthalmologist

- Born: September 18, 1900; New York City, New York
- Died: June 20, 1982 (aged 81)
- Education: Columbia University; New York University School of Medicine
- Spouse: Chifra Goldberg
- Children: 1
- Scientific career
- Fields: Ophthalmology
- Workplaces: Mount Sinai Hospital

Abraham Leon Kornzweig (September 18, 1900 – June 20, 1982), born in New York, was a physician and ophthalmologist specializing in geriatric ophthalmology. He opened a new field in investigative medicine and founded the Society of Geriatric Ophthalmology. He was also widely known as the co-discoverer and namer of Bassen-Kornzweig Syndrome, also called Abetalipoproteinemia. It was first noted by the United States physician Frank Bassen, who partnered Kornzweig to identify and describe causes and symptoms of the disease.

== Biography ==
Kornzweig graduated from Columbia University in 1922 and from the New York University School of Medicine in 1925. From 1925 to 1928, he trained as an intern at Mount Sinai Hospital, New York, including a study of pathology under the well-known Bernard Samuels, after which he entered private practice until 1934. He returned to Mount Sinai for a residency in ophthalmology and, in 1936, received a diplomate. For 17 years, he taught at NYU-Bellevue Medical School, where he was an associate clinical professor. He subsequently taught at Mount Sinai School of Medicine, where he was a clinical professor, and eventually emeritus professor, of ophthalmology. He was also director of research and chief of ophthalmology at the Jewish Home and Hospital for the Aged.

He retired in poor health in 1972, although he continued to work on his research projects until his death in 1982.

He married Chifra Goldberg, a naturalized citizen, born in Iași, Romania and they had one daughter.

== Disease ==
Bassen-Kornzweig disease, also called Bassen-Kornzweig Syndrome, is a rare congenital disorder in which the body fails to produce chylomicrons, a low density lipoprotein (LDL) and very low density lipoprotein (VLDL). Individuals with this condition are unable to properly digest fats. Symptoms include ataxia, peripheral neuropathy and other forms of nerve dysfunction. Treatment includes vitamin E.

Characteristics of the syndrome include the presence of acanthocytes (burr-cell malformation of the erythrocytes), and the reduction or even absence of B-lipoproteins. Complications include retinitis pigmentosa, degenerative changes in the central nervous system involving the cerebellum and long tracts, fatty diarrhea, ataxia, areflexia, demyelination, defective intestinal lipid absorption with low serum cholesterol level, intestinal malabsorption, amaurosis, retarded growth, and steatorrhea. Intellectual development may be slightly retarded. Many afflicted with the syndrome are unable to walk.

The syndrome appears in infancy. Affected children appear normal at birth but usually fail to thrive during their first year. The syndrome may predominate in males (71%). Most cases occur in children of Jewish descent, especially among Ashkenazi Jews. The disease is transmitted as an autosomal recessive trait. It is also commonly recognized as a betalipoprotein deficiency or abetalipoproteinemia.

== Publications ==
Kornzweig's publications include over 50 articles and books, beginning in 1948 with a series of articles on the "Eye in Old Age" and concluding with, in 1980, "New Ideas for the Old Eye".

=== Partial list ===
- Frank A. Bassen, M.D.; Abraham L. Kornzweig, M.D. (1950). "Malformation of the Erythrocytes in a Case of atypical Retinitis Pigmentosa". Blood. 5 (4): 381–387.
- Abraham L. Kornzweig, M.D.; Frank A. Bassen M.D. (1957). "Retinitis Pigmentosa, Acanthocytosis, and Heredodegenerative Neuromuscular Disease". AMA Arch Ophthalmology. 58 (2): 183–187.
- Abraham L. Kornzweig, MD; Ira Eliasoph, MD; Morris Feldstein, MD. (1968). "Selective Atrophy of the Radial Peripapillary Capillaries in Chronic Glaucoma". Archives of Ophthalmology. 80 (6): 696–702.
- Abraham L. Kornzweig, MD; Eliasoph, MD; Morris Feldstein, MD. (1966). "The Retinal Vasculature in Macular Degeneration". Archives of Ophthalmology. 75 (3): 326–333.
- Abraham L. Kornzweig, MD; Ira Eliasoph, MD; Morris Feldstein, MD. (1964). "Occlusive Disease of Retinal Vasculature". Archives of Ophthalmology. 71 (4): 542–551.
- Morris Feldstein, M.D.; Abraham L. Kornzweig, M.D.; Julius Schneider, M.D. (1959). "Ocular Surgery in the Aged". Journal of the American Medical Association. 170 (14): 1621–1625.

== See also ==
- Neuroacanthocytosis
