= Echinocyte =

Abnormal form of red blood cell

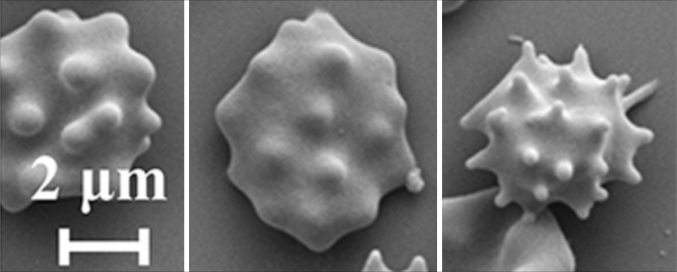
Scanning electron microscopy (SEM) of echinocytes

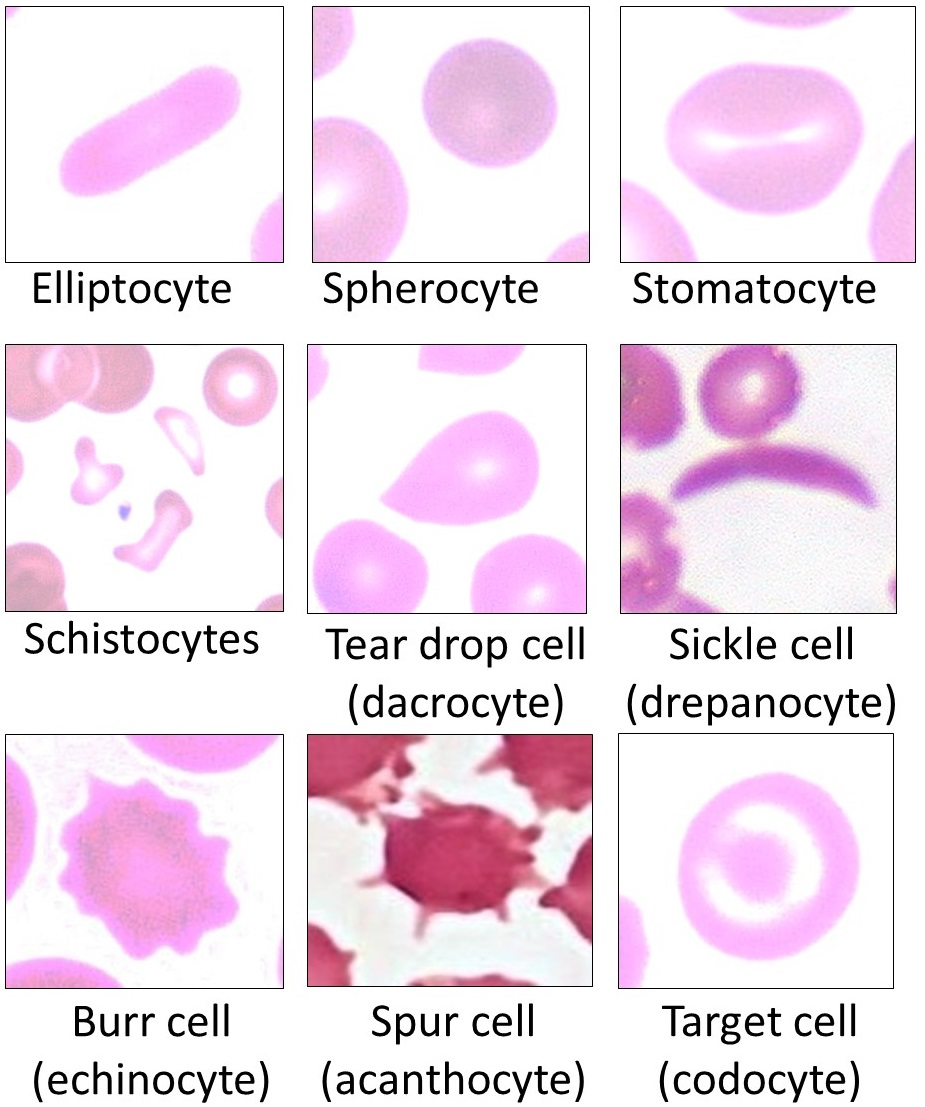
Echinocyte compared to other forms of poikilocytosis

Echinocyte (from the Greek word echinos, meaning 'hedgehog' or 'sea urchin'), in human biology and medicine, refers to a form of red blood cell that has an abnormal cell membrane characterized by many small, evenly spaced thorny projections. A more common term for these cells is burr cells.

== Physiology ==
Echinocytes are frequently confused with acanthocytes, but the mechanism of cell membrane alteration is different. Echinocytosis is a reversible condition of red blood cells that is often merely an artifact produced by EDTA, which is used as an anticoagulant in sampled blood. Echinocytes can be distinguished from acanthocytes by the shape of the projections, which are smaller and more numerous than in acanthocytes and are evenly spaced. Echinocytes also exhibit central pallor, or lightening of color in the center of the cell under Wright staining.

== Causes ==
In addition to appearing as an artifact of staining or drying, echinocytes are associated with:

- Uremia and chronic kidney disease
- pyruvate kinase deficiency
- hypophosphatemia
- hyperlipidemia
- Phosphoglycerate kinase deficiency
- Disseminated malignancy
- Myeloproliferative disorders
- Vitamin E deficiency
- Early posttransfusion of RBC

Echinocytes, like acanthocytes, may be found in hyperlipidemia caused by liver dysfunction, but the lipids themselves do not integrate into the membrane. Instead, it is speculated that cell surface receptors on the red blood cells bind with HDL cholesterol, which induces the shape change.

These cells were also shown to develop in vivo during hemodialysis, and disappear at the end of the procedure. The level of echinocytosis appeared to be related to the increase in blood viscosity that occurs during hemodialysis.

The formation of echinocytes can also be induced by electric field pulses. Alternating electric current produces modifications in the membranes of red blood cells, attributed to a higher permeability to water and a decreased tonicity, leading to the transformation into echinocytes.

== See also ==
- Poikilocytosis
