= Frank Bassen =

Frank Albert Bassen (14 November 1903 – 17 February 2003) practiced as a haematologist and internist in New York, 1933–1978, in affiliation with Mount Sinai Hospital. He was born 14 November 1903 in St. George, New Brunswick, Canada and graduated from McGill University. He emigrated to the United States via Vanceboro, Maine, in 1928 and was subsequently naturalized as a citizen of the United States. He died in 2003 at the age of 99 years.

In partnership with Abraham Kornzweig, Bassen identified Bassen-Kornzweig disease, a rare autosomal recessive disorder in which the body fails to produce chylomicrons, a low density lipoprotein (LDL) and very low density lipoprotein (VLDL). Individuals with this condition are unable to properly digest fats. Symptoms include ataxia, peripheral neuropathy and other forms of nerve dysfunction. Treatment includes vitamin E.

Characteristics of the syndrome include the presence of acanthocytes (burr-cell malformation of the erythrocytes), and the reduction or even absence of B-lipoproteins. Complications include retinitis pigmentosa, degenerative changes in the central nervous system involving the cerebellum and long tracts, fatty diarrhea, ataxia, areflexia, demyelination, defective intestinal lipid absorption with low serum cholesterol level, intestinal malabsorption, amaurosis, retarded growth, and steatorrhea. Intellectual development may be slightly retarded. Many afflicted with the syndrome are unable to walk.

The syndrome appears in infancy. Affected children appear normal at birth but usually fail to thrive during their first year. The syndrome may predominate in males (71%). Most cases occur in children of Jewish descent, especially among Ashkenazi Jews. The disease is transmitted as an autosomal recessive trait. It is also commonly recognized as a betalipoprotein deficiency or abetalipoproteinemia .
