= Chorea-acanthocytosis =

Rare autosomal recessive genetic condition

Neuroacanthocytosis
- Other names: Acanthocytosis with neurologic disorder, Levine-Critchley syndrome, ChAc
- This condition is inherited via autosomal recessive manner

Chorea-acanthocytosis (ChAc, also called choreoacanthocytosis) is a rare hereditary disease—evidence suggests that only 500 to 1,000 people worldwide have the condition. It is caused by a mutation in a gene that directs structural proteins in red blood cells. It belongs to a group of four diseases characterized under the name neuroacanthocytosis. When a patient's blood is viewed under a microscope, some of the red blood cells appear thorny. These thorny cells are called acanthocytes.

Other effects of the disease may include involuntary muscle movements, impaired balance and coordination, behavioral changes, memory problems, difficulty swallowing, speech difficulties, seizures, muscle weakness, personality changes, and neuronal degradation similar to Huntington's disease. The average age of onset of symptoms is 35 years. The disease is incurable and inevitably leads to premature death.

Chorea-acanthocytosis is a very complex autosomal recessive adult-onset neurodegenerative disorder. It often shows itself as a mixed movement disorder, in which chorea, tics, dystonia and even parkinsonism may appear as a symptom.

This disease is also characterized by the presence of a few different movement disorders including chorea, dystonia etc.

Chorea-acanthocytosis is considered an autosomal recessive disorder, although a few cases with autosomal dominant inheritance have been noted.

== Signs and symptoms ==
There are multiple symptoms that can help this disease to be diagnosed, this disease is marked by the presence of acanthocytes in blood (these acanthocytes can sometimes be absent or even make a late appearance in the course of the disease.) and neurodegeneration causing a choreiform movement disorder.Another one of them would be that this disease should be considered in patients who have elevated levels of acanthocytes in a peripheral blood film.

The serum creatine kinase is often elevated in the body of the people who are affected by this disease.Choreoacanthocytosis patients may have a "rubber man" appearance with truncal instability and sudden, violent trunk spasms. Patients develop generalized chorea and a minority of Choreoacanthocytosis patients develops Parkinsonism.In a least one third of patients, seizures, typically generalized, are the first manifestation of disease. Impairment of memory and executive functions is frequent, although not invariable.People afflicted by this disease also experience a loss of neurons. Loss of neurons is a hallmark of neurodegenerative diseases. Due to the generally non-regenerative nature of neuronal cells in the adult central nervous system, this results in an irreversible and fatal process of neurodegeneration. There is also the presence of several movement related disorders including chorea, dystonia and bradykinesia, one of the more incapacitating ones includes Truncal spasms.

== Cause ==
Choreo-acanthocytosis is caused by a mutation in both copies of the gene VPS13A, which codes for vacuolar protein sorting-associated protein 13A.

== Diagnosis ==
Protein function tests that demonstrate a reduce in chorein levels and also genetic analysis can confirm the diagnosis given to a patient. For a disease like this it is often necessary to sample the blood of the patient on multiple occasions with a specific request given to the haematologist to examine the film for acanthocytes. Another point is that the diagnosis of the disease can be confirmed by the absence of chorein in the western blot of the erythrocyte membranes.

== Treatment ==
The treatment to battle the disease chorea-acanthocytosis is completely symptomatic. For example, botulinum toxin injections can help to control orolingual dystonia. Deep brain stimulation is a treatment that has varied effects on the people suffering from the symptoms of this disease, for some it has helped in a large way and for other people it did not help whatsoever, it is more effective on specific symptoms of the disease. Patients with chorea-acanthocytosis should undergo a cardiac evaluation every five years to look for cardiomyopathy.
