= Pyknocytosis =

Presence of irregular red blood cells

Pyknocytosis is a hematologic state characterized by the presence of pyknocytes in the blood. Pyknocytes are red blood cells that appear distorted, irregular and small with abnormal projections and would typically be identified by a medical scientist and verified by a pathologist on a peripheral blood smear.

Infantile pyknocytosis is the most commonly associated condition, and is a rare pediatric hematological condition. It is a potential cause of neonatal hemolytic anemia. Infantile pyknocytosis typically presents with neonatal jaundice and severe anemia, often requiring blood transfusions. The associated hemolytic anemia is often transient with peak incidence at 3–4 weeks, with spontaneous and complete resolution by four to six months of life. An etiology for this condition has not been established but some evidence, including the presence of dehydrated red cells on peripheral blood smear that seem to have undergone oxidative stress, points to causes that include deficiency of antioxidants such as vitamin E or the presence of an oxidative factor. The diagnosis of infantile pyknocytosis is essentially based on the peripheral blood smear, with additional diagnostic investigations to rule out similarly presenting conditions such as glucose-6-phosphate dehydrogenase deficiency and pyruvate kinase deficiency. Both of these conditions can also result in pyknocytes observable on the blood smear. Treatment involves phototherapy if blood bilirubin levels are greater than normal for the age of the infant, and blood transfusion if hemoglobin is found to be unacceptably low or decreasing based on clinical judgement of laboratory values.
