= Myelophthisic anemia =

- Specialty: Hematology

Myelophthisic anemia (or myelophthisis) is a severe type of anemia found in some people with diseases that affect the bone marrow. Myelophthisis refers to the displacement of hemopoietic bone-marrow tissue by fibrosis, tumors, or granulomas. The word comes from the roots myelo-, which refers to bone marrow, and phthisis, shrinkage or atrophy.

== Causes ==
Myelophthisis can occur in the setting of chronic myeloproliferative disease (e.g. myelofibrosis), leukemia, lymphoma, and metastatic carcinoma or myeloma. It is common in people who have chronic idiopathic myelofibrosis. It has been linked to small-cell lung cancer, breast cancer or prostate cancer that metastasizes to the bone marrow.Currently, the most common cause is displacement of bone marrow by metastatic cancer (extramedullary hematopoiesis tends to be modest). Other causes include myeloproliferative disorders (especially late-stage or spent polycythemia vera), granulomatous diseases, and (lipid) storage diseases. Myelofibrosis can occur in all of these. Factors that may contribute to decreased RBC production include a decreased quantity of functioning hematopoietic tissue, disordered metabolism related to the underlying disorder, and, in some cases, erythrophagocytosis.

== Pathophysiology ==
Some cases of myelophthisis are thought to be related to the release of cytokines that simulate fibroblastic proliferation and fibrosis in the marrow.

== Diagnosis ==
The first test for diagnosis myelophthisis involves looking at a small sample of blood under a microscope. Myelophthisis is suggested by the presence of red blood cells that contain nuclei or are teardrop-shaped (dacryocytes), or immature granulocyte precursor cells which indicates leukoerythroblastosis is occurring because the displaced hematopoietic cells begin to undergo extramedullary hematopoiesis. These immature granulocytes are seen in peripheral blood smears. Diagnosis is confirmed when a bone marrow biopsy demonstrates significant replacement of the normal bone marrow compartment by fibrosis, malignancy or other infiltrative process. The presence of immature blood cell precursors helps distinguish another cause of pancytopenia, aplastic anemia, from myelophthisic anemia because in aplastic anemia the hematopoietic cells are damaged and immature blood cells are not seen in the peripheral blood.

There may be evidence of extramedullary hematopoiesis (marrow elements can be found in the spleen, liver).

== Treatment ==
Treatment of this disorder involves treatment of the underlying cancer.

== See also ==
- List of circulatory system conditions
- List of hematologic conditions
