= Irvine M. Levine =

American physician

Irvine M. Levine is an American physician known for discovering Levine-Critchley syndrome in 1960. He described his findings in the journal Neurology in 1964 and again in 1968. Levine served as the chief of neurological research at the VA Hospital in Boston.
