= McLeod syndrome =

- Other names: McLeod phenomenon
- McLeod syndrome is inherited in an X-linked recessive manner.

McLeod syndrome (/məˈklaʊd/ mə-KLOWD) is an X-linked recessive genetic disorder that may affect the blood, brain, peripheral nerves, muscle, and heart. It is caused by a variety of recessively inherited mutations in the XK gene on the X chromosome. The gene is responsible for producing the Kx protein, a secondary supportive protein for the Kell antigen on the red blood cell surface.

== Presentation ==
Patients usually begin to notice symptoms in their 30s and the course is usually slowly progressive. Common features include peripheral neuropathy, cardiomyopathy, and hemolytic anemia. Other features include limb chorea, facial tics, other oral movements (lip and tongue biting), seizures, a late-onset dementia, and behavioral changes.

== Genetics ==
The McLeod phenotype is a recessive mutation of the Kell blood group system. The McLeod gene encodes the XK protein, which is located on the X chromosome, and has the structural characteristics of a membrane transport protein but an unknown function. Absence of the XK protein is an X-linked disease. Mutational variants result in McLeod syndrome either with or without neuroacanthocytosis: the gene on the X chromosome for McLeod syndrome is physically close to the gene for chronic granulomatous disease. As a result, an individual with one relatively small deletion may have both diseases.

The phenotype may be present without the syndrome presenting.

== Diagnosis ==
=== Laboratory features ===
McLeod syndrome is one of only a few disorders in which acanthocytes may be found on the peripheral blood smear. Blood chemistry testing may show increased lactate dehydrogenase (LDH) indicative of hemolytic anemia or elevated creatine kinase when the patient is affected by myopathy (skeletal muscle damage).

=== Radiologic and pathologic features ===
MRI shows increased T2 signal in the lateral putamen with caudate atrophy and secondary lateral ventricular dilation. Necropsy shows loss of neurons and gliosis in the caudate and globus pallidus. Similar changes may also be seen in the thalamus, substantia nigra, and putamen. The cerebellum and cerebral cortex are generally spared.

== Treatment ==
There is no cure for McLeod syndrome; the treatment is supportive depending on symptoms. Medication may assist with management of epilepsy, and cardiac and psychiatric features, although patients may respond poorly to treatment for chorea.

== Prognosis ==
A typical patient with severe McLeod syndrome that begins in adulthood lives for an additional 5 to 10 years. Patients with cardiomyopathy have elevated risk for congestive heart failure and sudden cardiac death. The prognosis for a normal life span is often good in some patients with mild neurological or cardiac sequelae.

== Epidemiology ==
McLeod syndrome is present in 0.5 to 1 per 100,000 of the population. McLeod males have variable acanthocytosis due to a defect in the inner leaflet bilayer of the red blood cell, as well as mild hemolysis. McLeod females have only occasional acanthocytes and very mild hemolysis; the lesser severity is thought to be due to X chromosome inactivation via the Lyon effect. Some individuals with McLeod phenotype develop myopathy, neuropathy, or psychiatric symptoms, producing a syndrome that may mimic chorea.

== History ==
McLeod syndrome was discovered in 1961 and, similar to the Kell antigen system, was named after the first patient in which it was discovered; a Harvard dental student by the name of Hugh McLeod. McLeod's red blood cells demonstrated a peculiar appearance when viewed microscopically (acanthocytic (spiky)) and showed weak expression of Kell system antigens.

A pattern of pregnancy loss and infant deaths associated with the wives of King Henry VIII of England suggests he may have been Kell-positive and had McLeod syndrome given his eventual premature mental deterioration.

== In popular culture ==
McLeod syndrome was featured in the Season 7, Episode 12 of House, "You Must Remember This".
