= Zieve's syndrome =

- Specialty: Gastroenterology

Zieve's syndrome is an acute metabolic condition that can occur during withdrawal from prolonged heavy alcohol use. It is defined by hemolytic anemia (with spur cells and acanthocytes), hyperlipoproteinemia (excessive blood lipoprotein), jaundice (elevation of unconjugated bilirubin), and abdominal pain. The underlying cause is liver delipidization. This is distinct from alcoholic hepatitis which, however, may present simultaneously or develop later.

Diagnosis of Zieve's syndrome should be considered in patients with prolonged alcohol use (especially after an episode of binge drinking) with an elevation of unconjugated bilirubin and without obvious signs of gastrointestinal bleeding.

== Pathogenesis ==
The proposed mechanism of the characteristic haemolytic anemia in Zieve's syndrome is due to alteration of the red cell metabolism, namely pyruvate kinase instability leaving them susceptible to circulating hemolysin such as lysolecithin. Changes in membrane lipid compositions such as increased cholesterol and polyunsaturated fatty acid (PUFA) have been reported during the hemolytic phase.

== Diagnosis ==
The diagnosis is demonstrated by the triad of jaundice, hemolytic anemia, and hyperlipidemia, also sometimes presenting with alcoholic hepatitis.

== Treatment ==
Definitive treatment for Zieve's syndrome is alcohol cessation. Individuals with markedly elevated triglycerides, particularly with a history of pancreatitis or intracerebral hemorrhage, may require plasmapharesis to avoid complications associated with hypertriglyceridemia.

== History ==
Zieve's syndrome was initially described in 1958. Leslie Zieve described patients with a combination of alcoholic liver disease, hemolytic anemia and hypertriglyceridemia.
