= Apolipoprotein B deficiency =

- Other names: Familial defective apolipoprotein B-100
- Specialty: Medical genetics

Apolipoprotein B deficiency or "familial hypobetalipoproteinemia" is an autosomal disorder caused by one of several possible mutations, either recessive or dominant. In all such cases, it is characterized by low levels of low-density lipoprotein and apoB-100. Affected patients are also usually found with vitamin E deficiency.

It is also known as "normotriglyceridemic hypobetalipoproteinemia".

== See also ==
- Familial hypercholesterolemia
