= Heinz body =

Abnormal inclusions in red blood cells

Heinz bodies (also referred to as "Heinz-Ehrlich bodies") are inclusions within red blood cells composed of denatured hemoglobin. They are not visible with routine blood staining techniques, but can be seen with supravital staining. The presence of Heinz bodies represents damage to hemoglobin and is classically observed in G6PD deficiency, a genetic disorder that causes hemolytic anemia. In veterinary medicine, Heinz bodies may be seen following the consumption of foods containing thiosulfate and propylene glycol compounds by cats, dogs and certain primates.

== History ==
They are named after Robert Heinz (1865–1924), a German physician who in 1890 described these inclusions in connection with cases of hemolytic anemia.

== Form and appearance ==
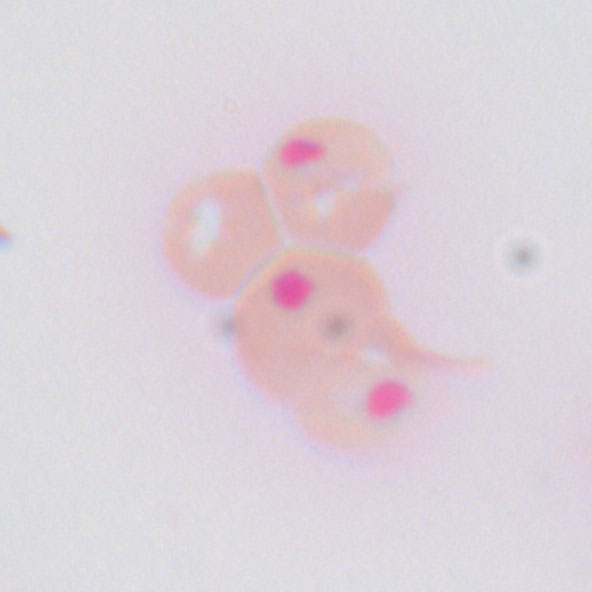
Heinz body stain of feline blood, showing three distinct Heinz bodies

Heinz bodies appear as small round inclusions within the red cell body, though they are not visible when stained with Romanowsky dyes. They are visualized more clearly with supravital staining (e.g., with new methylene blue, crystal violet or bromocresol green).

== Causes ==
Heinz bodies are formed by damage to the hemoglobin component molecules, usually through oxidative damage by administered drugs, or from an inherited mutation (i.e. change of an internal amino acid residue). As a result, an electron from the hemoglobin is transferred to an oxygen molecule, which creates a reactive oxygen species (ROS) that can cause severe cell damage leading to premature cell lysis. Damaged cells are cleared by macrophages in the spleen, where the precipitate and damaged membrane are removed, leading to characteristic "bite cells". The denaturing process is irreversible and the continual elimination of damaged cells leads to Heinz body anemia.

There are several pathways leading to the hemoglobin damage.

- NADPH deficiency can cause a dysfunction in glutathione peroxidase which is an enzyme that converts hydrogen peroxide (a reactive oxygen species) into water.
- G6PD (glucose-6-phosphate dehydrogenase) deficiency exacerbated by administration of oxidant drugs (e.g., primaquine, dapsone, quinidine) can also result in Heinz bodies. G6PD deficient red cells in combination with high levels of oxidants causes a cross-linking of sulfhydryl groups on globin chains which causes a denaturing and formation of Heinz body precipitates.
- Heinz bodies can also be found in chronic liver disease.
- Alpha-thalassemia. Normal adult hemoglobin is composed of two alpha and two beta chains. Alpha thalassemia patients have partial or complete defects in alpha globin production, leading to a relative abundance of beta globin chains in the cell. These excess beta globin chains aggregate to form HbH, which has decreased solubility and precipitates in the red blood cell cytoplasm. This is not direct damage to hemoglobin per se, but rather a perturbation in the quaternary structure of hemoglobin.

The presence of Heinz bodies may also be a feature of hyposplenism or asplenia, when a damaged or absent spleen cannot remove these damaged cells from circulation.

=== Veterinary ===
Heinz bodies are associated with the consumption of paracetamol (acetaminophen), garlic, and onions by cats, dogs, and various primates. Thiosulfate compounds in the flesh of onions have been identified as the cause.

Propylene glycol was once a common ingredient in soft moist cat food. According to the FDA "It was known for some time that propylene glycol caused Heinz Body formation in the red blood cells of cats (small clumps of proteins seen in the cells when viewed under the microscope), but it could not be shown to cause overt anemia or other clinical effects. However, recent reports in the veterinary literature of scientifically sound studies have shown that propylene glycol reduces the red blood cell survival time, renders red blood cells more susceptible to oxidative damage, and has other adverse effects in cats consuming the substance at levels found in soft-moist food. In light of this new data, CVM amended the regulations to expressly prohibit the use of propylene glycol in cat foods."

== Treatment ==
There is no specific treatment for Heinz bodies; however, they are important as a diagnostic indicator for the causative conditions listed above.
