= VPS13A =

Protein-coding gene in the species Homo sapiens

Identifiers
- Aliases: VPS13A, CHAC, CHOREIN, vacuolar protein sorting 13 homolog A
- External IDs: OMIM: 605978; MGI: 2444304; GeneCards: VPS13A

Gene location (Human)
Chr.	Chromosome 9 (human)
Band	9q21.2	Start	77,177,445 bp
Band	9q21.2	End	77,421,537 bp

Gene location (Mouse)
Chr.	Chromosome 19 (mouse)
Band	19|19 A- B	Start	16,592,730 bp
Band	19|19 A- B	End	16,758,297 bp
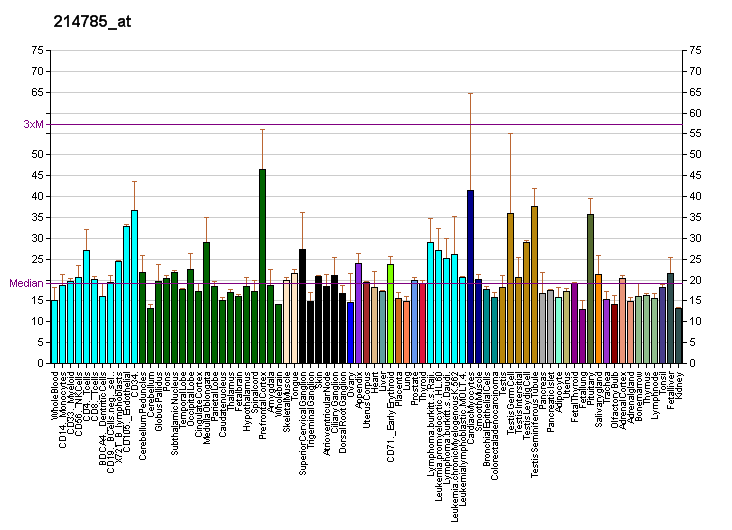

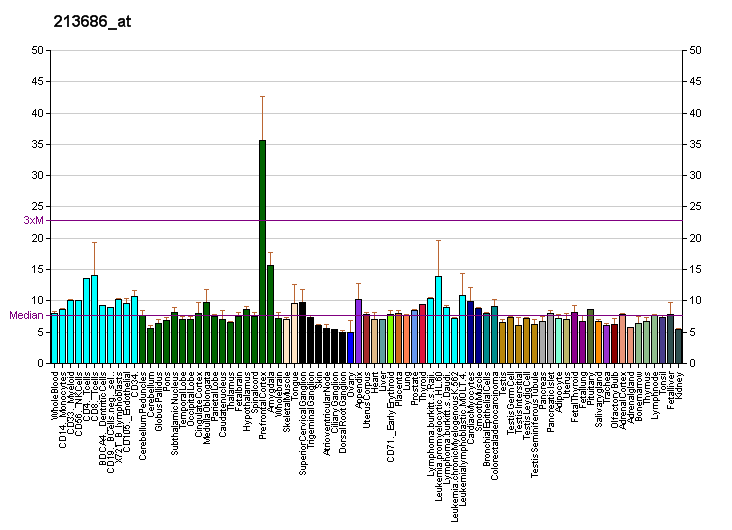
RNA expression pattern
Bgee	Human / Mouse (ortholog); Top expressed in: jejunal mucosa; biceps brachii; Skeletal muscle tissue of biceps brachii; Achilles tendon; testicle; left coronary artery; Brodmann area 23; hair follicle; gastric mucosa; rectum / Top expressed in: spermatocyte; secondary oocyte; spermatid; zygote; renal corpuscle; medullary collecting duct; primary oocyte; dentate gyrus of hippocampal formation granule cell; lumbar spinal ganglion; lumbar subsegment of spinal cord; More reference expression data
BioGPS	More reference expression data
Gene ontology
Molecular function	protein binding
Cellular component	dense core granule; cytosol; intracellular anatomical structure; extrinsic component of membrane
Biological process	Golgi to endosome transport; protein transport; social behavior; protein localization; locomotory behavior; nervous system development; autophagy; protein targeting to vacuole; protein retention in Golgi apparatus
Sources:Amigo / QuickGO
Orthologs
Databases	NCBI: entry; OMA: entry
Species	Human	Mouse
Entrez	23230	271564
Ensembl	ENSG00000197969	ENSMUSG00000046230
UniProt	Q96RL7	Q5H8C4
RefSeq (mRNA)	NM_001018037; NM_001018038; NM_015186; NM_033305	NM_173028
RefSeq (protein)	NP_001018047; NP_001018048; NP_056001; NP_150648	NP_766616
Location (UCSC)	Chr 9: 77.18 – 77.42 Mb	Chr 19: 16.59 – 16.76 Mb
PubMed search
- Wikidata
View/Edit Human	View/Edit Mouse

VPS13A (Vacuolar protein sorting-associated protein 13A) is a protein that in humans is encoded by the VPS13A gene.

== Function ==
The protein encoded by this gene may control steps in the cycling of proteins through the trans-Golgi network to endosomes, lysosomes and the plasma membrane. Mutations in this gene cause the autosomal recessive disorder, chorea acanthocytosis. Alternative splicing of this gene results in multiple transcript variants.
