= Elliptocyte =

Abnormal red blood cell

Cigar cells in elliptocytosis
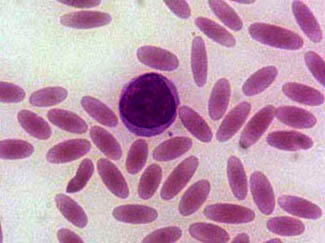
- Blood smear showing elliptocytes
- Specialty: Hematology

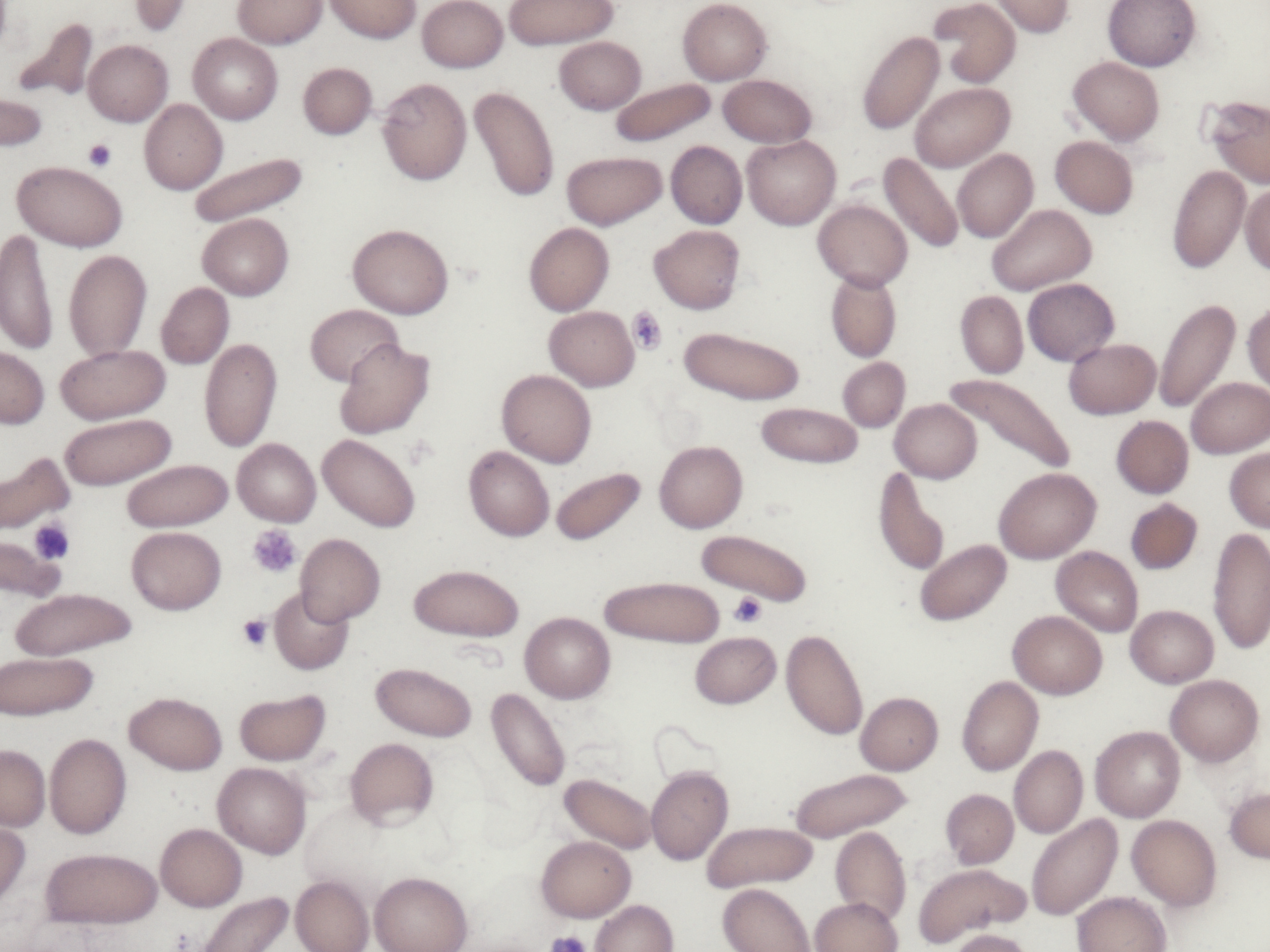
blood film in a patient with hereditary elliptocytosis: approximately 60% to 70% of the RBCs are elliptocytes.

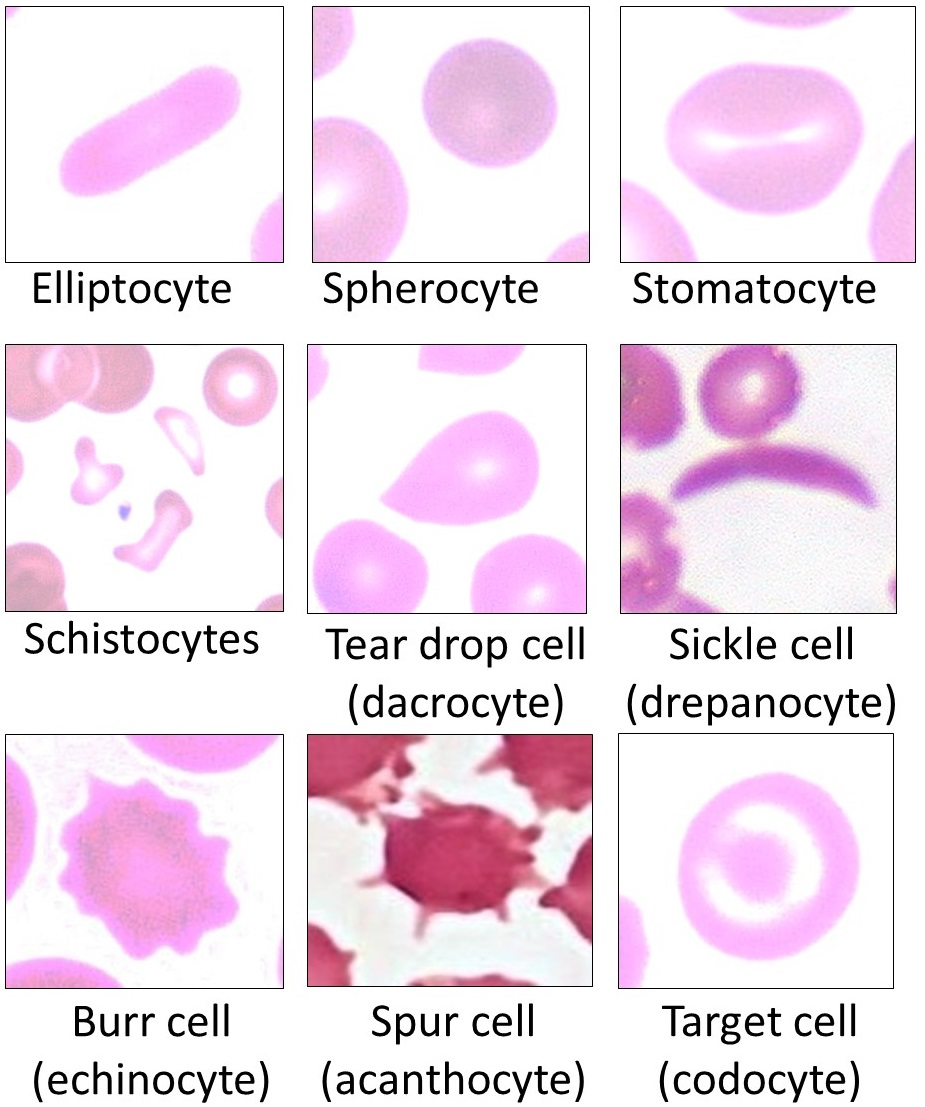
Elliptocyte compared to other forms of poikilocytosis.

Elliptocytes, also known as ovalocytes or cigar cells, are abnormally shaped red blood cells that appear oval or elongated, from slightly egg-shaped to rod or pencil forms. They have normal central pallor with the hemoglobin appearing concentrated at the ends of the elongated cells when viewed through a light microscope. The ends of the cells are blunt and not sharp like sickle cells.

Elliptocytes are commonly associated with hereditary elliptocytosis. However, they may also be seen in iron deficiency anemia, sepsis, malaria and other pathological states that decrease red blood cell turnover and or production. In the case of iron deficiency anemia, microcytosis and hypochromia would also be expected.

== Causes ==
Rare elliptocytes (less than 1%) on a peripheral blood smear are a normal finding.

These abnormal red blood cells are seen in higher numbers in the blood films of patients with blood disorders such as:

- Hereditary elliptocytosis and Southeast Asian ovalocytosis
- Thalassemia
- Iron deficiency
- Myelodysplastic syndrome and myelofibrosis
- Megaloblastic anemia
