= Dacrocyte =

Abnormal shape of red blood cell

Dacrocytes (teardrop cells)

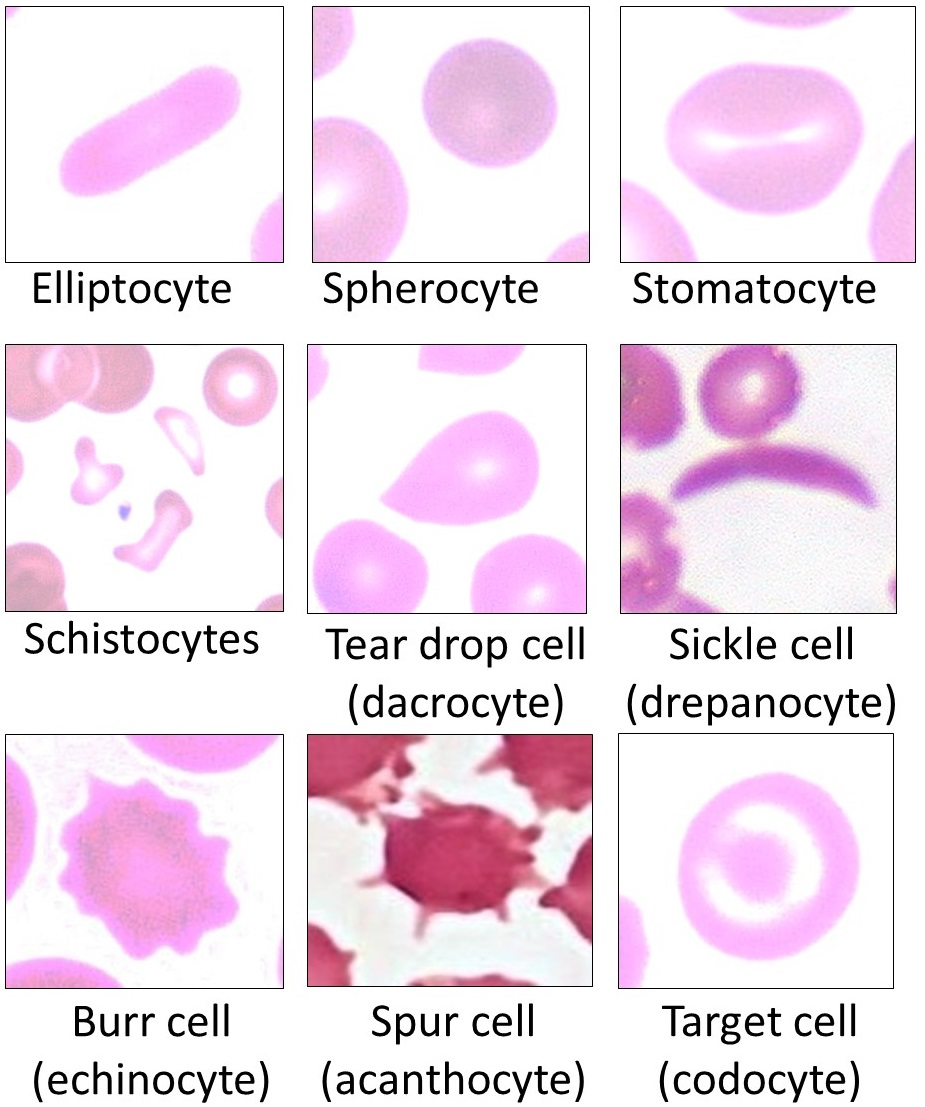
Dacrocytes compared to other forms of poikilocytosis

A dacrocyte (or dacryocyte) is a type of poikilocyte that is shaped like a teardrop (a "teardrop cell"). A marked increase of dacrocytes is known as dacrocytosis.

These tear drop cells are found primarily in diseases with bone marrow fibrosis, such as: primary myelofibrosis, myelodysplastic syndromes during the late course of the disease, rare form of acute leukemias and myelophthisis caused by metastatic cancers. Rare causes are myelofibrosis associated with post-irradiation, toxins, autoimmune diseases, metabolic conditions, inborn hemolytic anemias, iron-deficiency anemia or β-thalassemia.

== Etiology ==
One theory regarding dacrocyte formation is that red blood cells containing various inclusions undergo "pitting" by the spleen to remove these inclusions, and in the process, they can be stretched too far to return to their original shape. It is also thought that this can similarly occur when red blood cells with large inclusions are obstructed from passing through the microcirculation, and the portion containing the inclusion thus gets pinched, leaving a tailed end. As dacrocytes are associated with myelofibrosis, they are also theorized to be formed due to mechanically squeezing out from the bone marrow as a result of the infiltrative process.
