= Kell blood group glycoprotein =

KEL

Identifiers
- Aliases: KEL, Kell Blood Group, CD238, Kell metallo-endopeptidase (Kell blood group), Kell Blood Group Glycoprotein, Kell blood group, metallo-endopeptidase, Kell Blood Group Antigen, EC 3.4.24, Kell Blood Group, Metalloendopeptidase, Kell, ECE3, Kell–Cellano system
- External IDs: OMIM: 613883; MGI: 1346053; GeneCards: KEL

Gene location (Human)
Chr.	Chromosome 7 (human)
Band	7q34	Start	142,941,114 bp
Band	7q34	End	142,962,363 bp

Gene location (Mouse)
Chr.	Chromosome 6 (mouse)
Band	6 B2.1|6 19.86 cM	Start	41,663,264 bp
Band	6 B2.1|6 19.86 cM	End	41,681,273 bp
RNA expression pattern
Bgee	Human / Mouse (ortholog); Top expressed in: right testis; left testis; bone marrow; bone marrow cell; C1 segment; lymph node; corpus callosum; testicle; blood; spleen / Top expressed in: fetal liver hematopoietic progenitor cell; tibiofemoral joint; human fetus; spleen; blood; yolk sac; genital tubercle; endocardial cushion; embryo; body of femur; More reference expression data
BioGPS	n/a
Gene ontology
Molecular function	metalloendopeptidase activity; peptidase activity; protein binding; metallopeptidase activity; hydrolase activity; metal ion binding
Cellular component	integral component of membrane; plasma membrane; membrane
Biological process	regulation of cell size; negative regulation of potassium ion transmembrane transport; myelination; regulation of axon diameter; cellular magnesium ion homeostasis; cellular calcium ion homeostasis; skeletal muscle fiber development; vasoconstriction; proteolysis
Sources:Amigo / QuickGO
Orthologs
Databases	NCBI: entry; OMA: entry
Species	Human	Mouse
Entrez	3792	23925
Ensembl	ENSG00000276615; ENSG00000197993	ENSMUSG00000029866
UniProt	P23276	Q9EQF2
RefSeq (mRNA)	NM_000420	NM_032540
RefSeq (protein)	NP_000411	NP_115929
Location (UCSC)	Chr 7: 142.94 – 142.96 Mb	Chr 6: 41.66 – 41.68 Mb
PubMed search
- Wikidata
View/Edit Human	View/Edit Mouse

The Kell blood group glycoprotein also known as CD238 is a protein that in humans is encoded by the KEL gene. The KEL gene is highly polymorphic and forms the basis of the Kell antigen system.

== Structure ==
The Kell glycoprotein is a 732-amino-acid, single-pass, glycosylated protein that is expressed in the plasma membrane of red blood cells. It is covalently attached via a disulfide bond to the multipass XK protein.

== Function ==
The Kell protein is responsible for cleaving an inactive endothelin-3 precursor to its active form. The Kell–XK complex is also associated with red blood cell membrane integrity.

== Clinical significance ==
The Kell protein is clinically important since it strongly immunogenic and can cause life threatening red blood transfusion reactions. In addition, Kell alloimmunization is caused by a direct maternal immune response to fetal KELL antigens or through a prior antigen-positive pregnancy or transfusion.
