= Degmacyte =

Abnormally shaped mature red blood cell

A degmacyte or bite cell is an abnormally shaped mature red blood cell with one or more semicircular portions removed from the cell margin, known as "bites". These "bites" result from the mechanical removal of denatured hemoglobin during splenic filtration as red cells attempt to migrate through endothelial slits from splenic cords into the splenic sinuses. Bite cells are known to be a result from processes of oxidative hemolysis, such as Glucose-6-phosphate dehydrogenase deficiency, in which uncontrolled oxidative stress causes hemoglobin to denature and form Heinz bodies. Bite cells can contain more than one "bite." The "bites" in degmacytes are smaller than the missing red blood cell fragments seen in schistocytes.

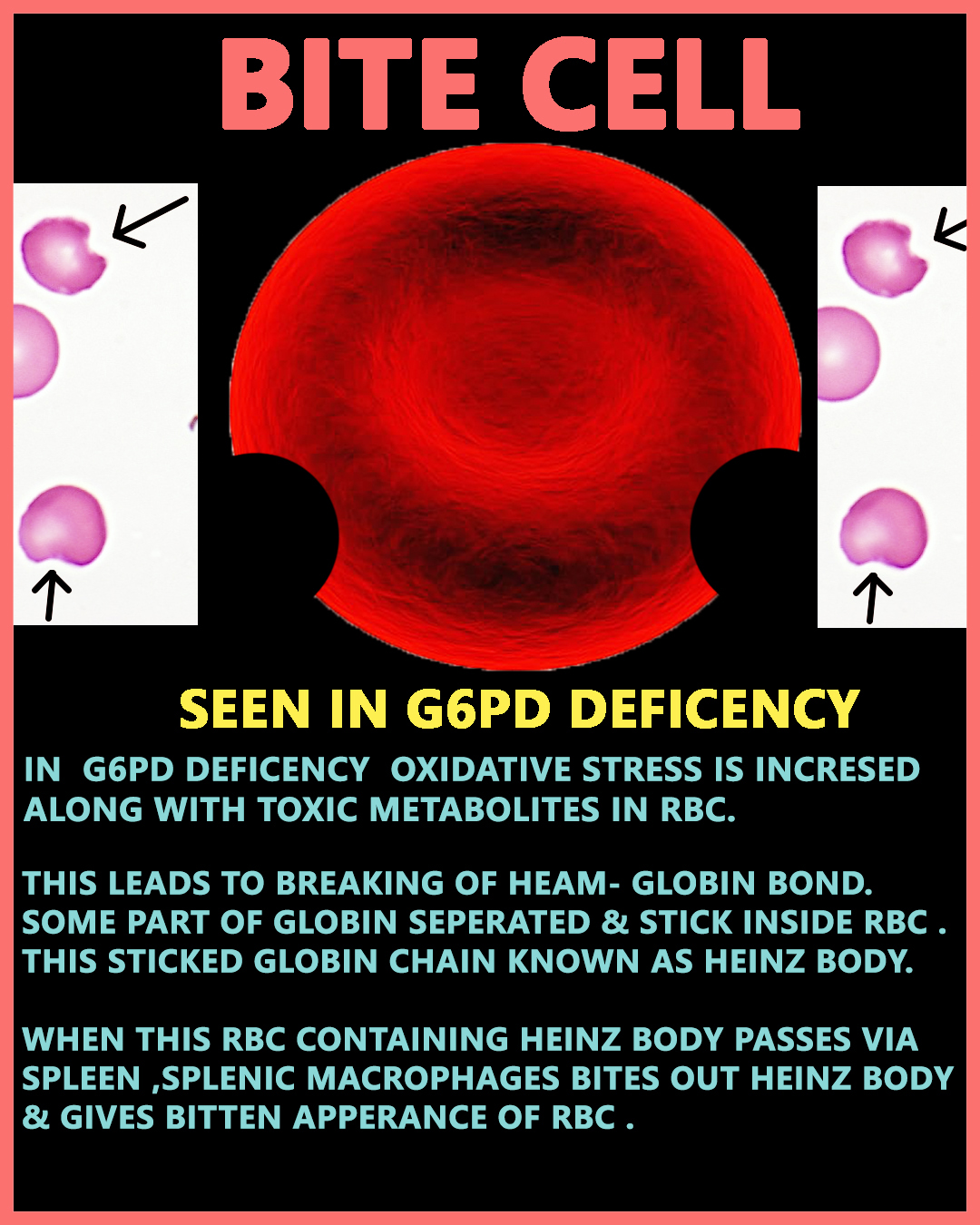
BITE CELLS

Degmacytes usually appear smaller, denser, and more contracted than a normal red blood cell due to the bites. The appearance of the "bites" in red blood cells may vary in number, smoothness, and size. These cells can also exhibit other peripheral effects.

== Blister cell ==
In blister cells or hemighost cells, an outer rim of cytoplasm is maintained, and when this ruptures, the resulting bite cells have horn-like projections. Blister cells appear as red blood cells containing a peripherally located vacuole.

== Causes ==
Bite cells are caused by G6PD deficiency, NADPH deficiency, thalassemia, glutathione synthase deficiency, and other red-cell enzymopathies involving the pentose phosphate shunt, oxidative drugs and unstable hemoglobins. People receiving large quantities of oxidative drugs such as dapsone or sulfasalazine are more prone to have degmacytes. The underlying cause of degmacytes is a result of the splenic macrophages removing Heinz bodies from the membrane of red blood cells, which results in a "bitten" appearance of the cell.

== Diagnosis ==
The diagnosis of degmacytes is performed by using a peripheral blood smear to analyze the red blood cells in the blood. The degmacyte look similar to a "bitten apple", which is their defining feature. However, bite cells may be difficult to distinguish from helmet cells, a fragmented red blood cell, due to the similarity in shape. Confirming the presence of degmacytes in patients likely indicates a form of red blood cell oxidant injury or hemolysis.

== Treatment and Prevention ==
Bite cells are primarily formed due to a G6PD deficiency combined with oxidative stress or other trigger, such as fava beans and certain antimalarial or sulfa drugs. Patients may attempt to decrease exposure to hypoxia, which can then lead to hemolytic disorders. If one is not G6PD deficient, lessening the use of oxidative triggers may help prevent the formation of degmacytes.

As there are currently no means of reversing red blood cell damage and the formation of degmacytes, treatment options are limited to blood transfusions.

== Etymology ==
From Ancient Greek δῆγμα (dêgma): “to bite” + -cyte.
