= XK (protein) =

Protein-coding gene in the species Homo sapiens

Identifiers
- Aliases: XK, Kell blood group precursor, X-linked Kx blood group, KX, MCLDS, NA, NAC, X1k, XKR1
- External IDs: OMIM: 314850; MGI: 103569; GeneCards: XK

Gene location (Human)
Chr.	X chromosome (human)
Band	Xp21.1	Start	37,685,791 bp
Band	Xp21.1	End	37,732,130 bp

Gene location (Mouse)
Chr.	X chromosome (mouse)
Band	X A1.1|X 4.22 cM	Start	9,138,995 bp
Band	X A1.1|X 4.22 cM	End	9,179,489 bp
RNA expression pattern
Bgee	Human / Mouse (ortholog); Top expressed in: trabecular bone; jejunal mucosa; mucosa of colon; mucosa of sigmoid colon; endothelial cell; duodenum; bone marrow; mucosa of ileum; middle temporal gyrus; Brodmann area 23 / Top expressed in: muscle of thigh; dentate gyrus of hippocampal formation granule cell; cerebellar cortex; granulocyte; superior frontal gyrus; primary visual cortex; ventricular zone; genital tubercle; tail of embryo; embryo; More reference expression data
BioGPS	n/a
Gene ontology
Molecular function	protein binding; transporter activity
Cellular component	integral component of membrane; plasma membrane; membrane
Biological process	regulation of cell size; myelination; regulation of axon diameter; cellular magnesium ion homeostasis; cellular calcium ion homeostasis; skeletal muscle fiber development; amino acid transport
Sources:Amigo / QuickGO
Orthologs
Databases	NCBI: entry; OMA: entry
Species	Human	Mouse
Entrez	7504	22439
Ensembl	ENSG00000047597	ENSMUSG00000015342
UniProt	P51811	Q9QXY7
RefSeq (mRNA)	NM_021083	NM_023500
RefSeq (protein)	NP_066569	NP_075989
Location (UCSC)	Chr X: 37.69 – 37.73 Mb	Chr X: 9.14 – 9.18 Mb
PubMed search
- Wikidata
View/Edit Human	View/Edit Mouse

XK (protein)

Identifiers
- Symbol: XK
- Alt. symbols: XKR1, Kx, X1k
- NCBI gene: 7504
- HGNC: 12811
- OMIM: 314850
- PDB: BAE48708
- RefSeq: NM_021083
- UniProt: P51811

Other data
- Locus: Chr. X p21.2-p21.1
Search for
- Structures: Swiss-model
- Domains: InterPro

XK (also known as Kell blood group precursor) is a protein found on human red blood cells and other tissues which is responsible for the Kx antigen which helps determine a person's blood type.

== Clinical significance ==
The Kx antigen plays a role in matching blood for blood transfusions.

Mutation of XK protein may lead to McLeod syndrome, a multi-system disorder characterized by hemolytic anemia, myopathy, acanthocytosis, and chorea.

XK is located on the X chromosome (cytogenetic band Xp21.1) and absence of the XK protein is an X-linked disease.

== Clinical diagnostic ==
Clinical testing in patient care for Kx antigen follows published minimum quality and operational requirements, similar to red cell genotyping for any of the other recognized blood group systems. Molecular analysis can identify gene variants (alleles) that may affect Kx antigen expression on the red cell membrane.

== Function ==
XK is a membrane transport protein of unknown action.
