= Poikilocytosis =

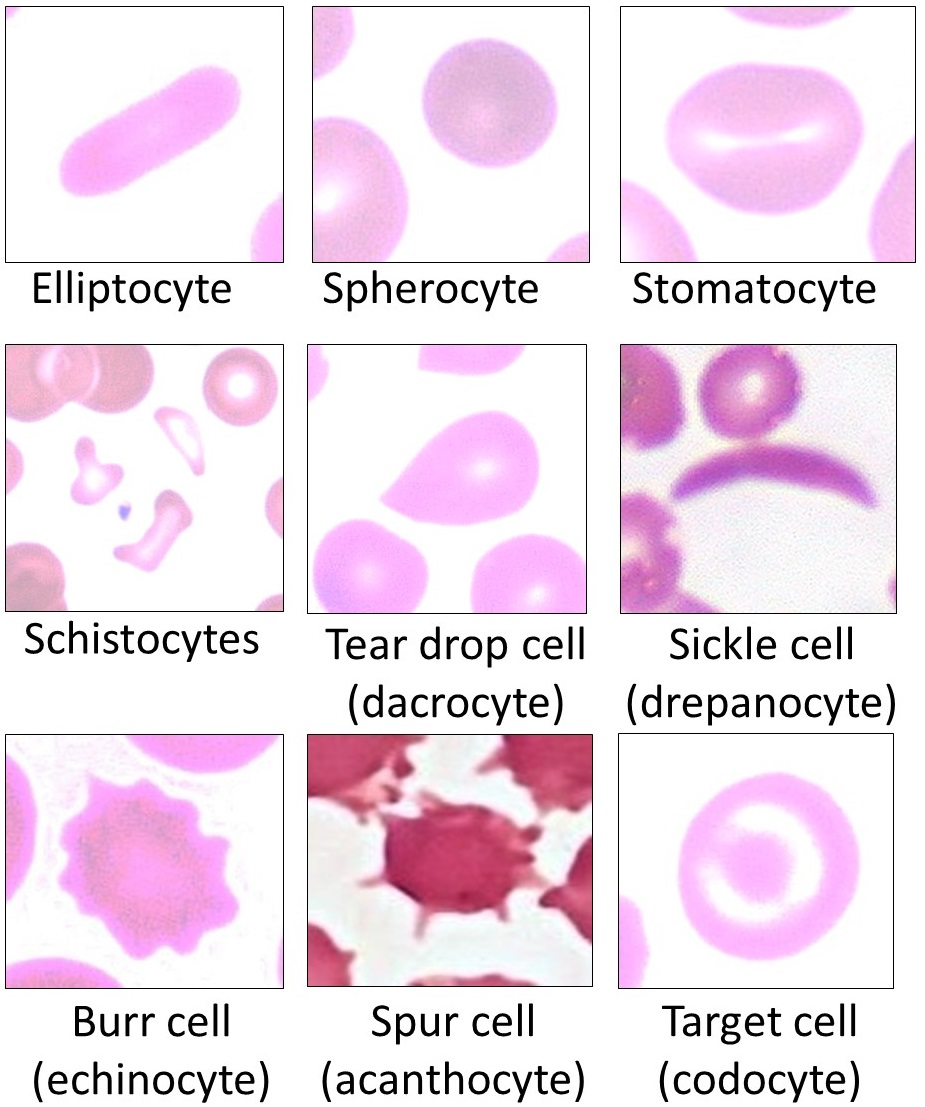
- Examples of red blood cell types that can give rise to poikilocytosis.

Poikilocytosis is variation in the shapes of red blood cells. Poikilocytes may be oval, teardrop-shaped, sickle-shaped or irregularly contracted.

Normal red blood cells are round, flattened disks that are thinner in the middle than at the edges. A poikilocyte is an abnormally-shaped red blood cell. Generally, poikilocytosis can refer to an increase in abnormal red blood cells of any shape, where they make up 10% or more of the total population of red blood cells.

== Types ==
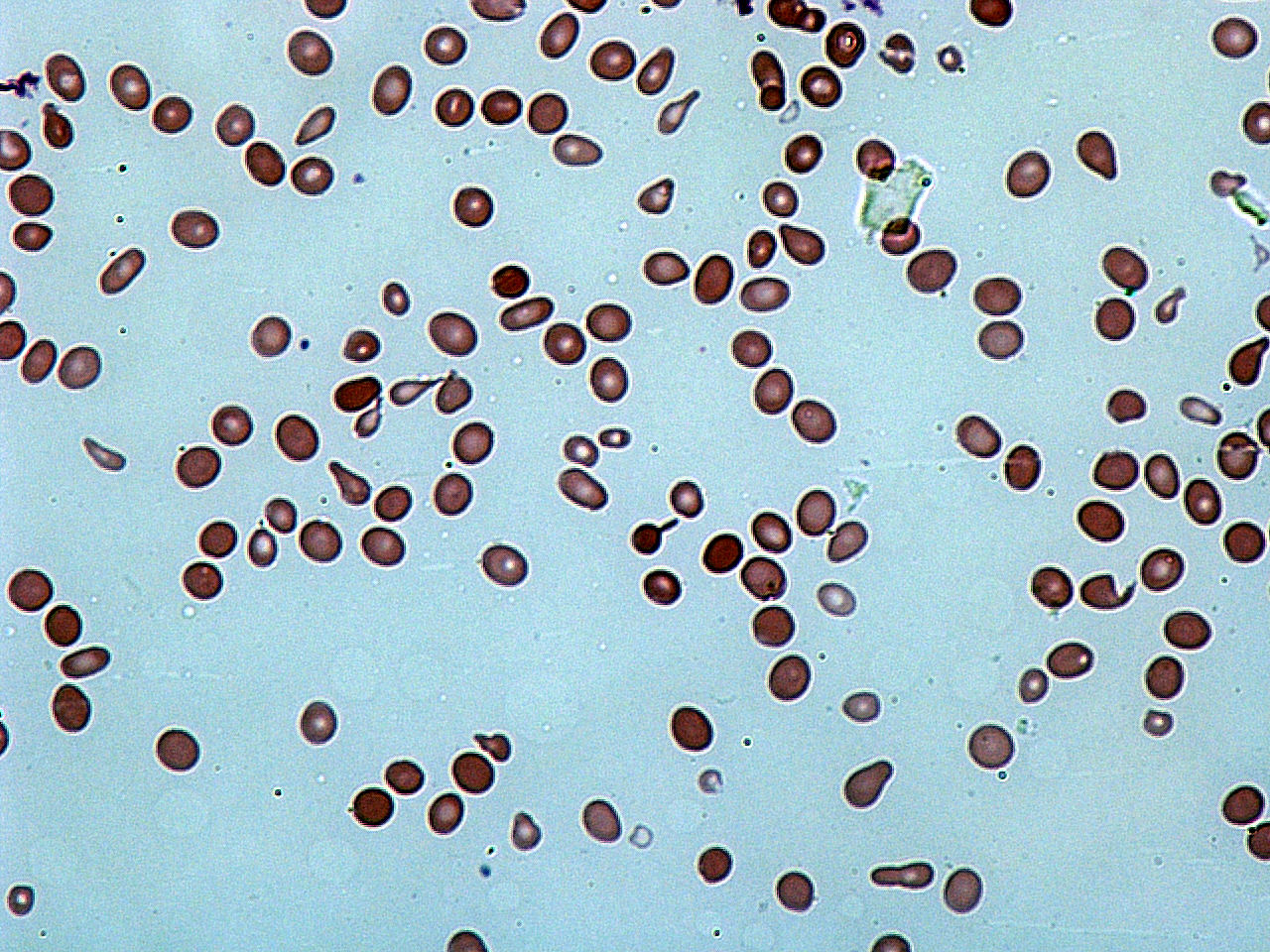
Human red blood cells showing poikilocytosis

=== Membrane abnormalities ===
1. Acanthocytes or Spur/Spike cells
2. Codocytes or Target cells
3. Echinocytes and Burr cells
4. Elliptocytes and Ovalocytes
5. Spherocytes
6. Stomatocytes or Mouth cells
7. Drepanocytes or Sickle Cells
8. Degmacytes or "bite cells"

=== Trauma ===
1. Dacrocytes or Teardrop Cells
2. Keratocytes
3. Microspherocytes and Pyropoikilocytes
4. Schistocytes
5. Semilunar bodies

== Diagnosis ==
Poikilocytosis may be diagnosed with a test called a blood smear. During a blood smear, a medical technologist/clinical lab scientist spreads a thin layer of blood on a microscope slide and stains the blood to help differentiate the cells. The technologist/clinical lab scientist then views the blood under a microscope, where the sizes and shapes of the red blood cells can be seen.

== Treatment ==
In all cases, the treatment of poikilocytosis depends on its cause. For example, poikilocytosis can be caused by a vitamin deficiency (e.g. vitamin B_{12}, folic acid), in which case the treatment is to replenish the deficient vitamin. It can be caused by a digestive disease, such as celiac disease, in which case the solution may lie in treating the underlying celiac disease so that nutrients can be properly absorbed.

== Etymology ==
The term derives from poikilos (ποικίλος), which means "varied" in Greek.

== See also ==
- Anisocytosis
