= Congenital dyserythropoietic anemia type I =

- Specialty: Hematology

Congenital dyserythropoietic anemia type I (CDA I) is a disorder of blood cell production, particularly of the production of erythroblasts, which are the precursors of the red blood cells (RBCs).

== Presentation ==
Many affected individuals have yellowing of the skin and eyes (jaundice) and an enlarged liver and spleen (hepatosplenomegaly). This condition also causes the body to absorb too much iron, which builds up and can damage tissues and organs. In particular, iron overload can lead to an abnormal heart rhythm (arrhythmia), congestive heart failure, diabetes, and chronic liver disease (cirrhosis). Rarely, people with CDA type I are born with skeletal abnormalities, most often involving the fingers and toes.

== Genetics ==
CDA type I, an autosomal recessive disorder, is transmitted by both parents and usually results from mutations in the CDAN1 gene. Little is known about the function of this gene, and it is unclear how mutations cause the characteristic features of CDA type I. Some people with this condition do not have identified mutations in the CDAN1 gene, leading researchers to believe that mutations in at least one other gene can also cause this form of the disorder.

Version	Type	OMIM	Gene	Locus
Ia	CDAN1A	224120	CDAN1	15q15
Ib	CDAN1B	615631	C15ORF41	15q14

== Diagnosis ==
CDA type I is characterized by moderate to severe anemia. It is usually diagnosed in childhood or adolescence, although in some cases, the condition can be detected before birth.

== Treatment ==
Treatment consists of frequent blood transfusions and chelation therapy. Potential cures include bone marrow transplantation and gene therapy.

== See also ==
- Congenital dyserythropoietic anemia
- List of hematologic conditions
- Hemoglobinopathy
- Thalassemia
