= TSR2 =

TSR2 may refer to:

- TSR2 (gene), a human gene encoding a protein involved in ribosome biogenesis
- BAC TSR-2, British Aircraft Corporation Tactical Strike/Reconnaissance 2
- Former name of RTS Deux, a public television channel in Switzerland owned by Radio Télévision Suisse
