= Ineffective erythropoiesis =

- Specialty: Hematology

Ineffective erythropoiesis a condition in which the bone marrow produces red blood cells (erythrocytes) that are unable to mature properly and are pre-maturely destroyed due to various causes. Erythropoiesis is the overall process that the body goes through to produce red blood cells. The red blood cell's main function is to carry and transport oxygen from the lungs to tissues throughout the body. If the red blood cells are unable to mature properly or are destroyed pre-maturely, this can lead to anemia. This mechanism is principally responsible for the anemia seen in acquired conditions such as certain subtypes of myelodysplastic syndrome (MDS) and inherited disorders such as β-thalassemia, inherited sideroblastic anemias, as well as congenital dyserythropoietic anemias.

== See also ==
- Congenital dyserythropoietic anemias
- List of hematologic conditions
