= CRMO =

CRMO may refer to:

- 41xx steel, also known CrMo
- CHOU (AM), a radio station in Quebec
- Chief risk officer (CRO), also known as Chief risk management officer (CRMO)
- Chronic recurrent multifocal osteomyelitis, a rare bone disease
