= Congenital dyserythropoietic anemia type III =

- Specialty: Hematology

Congenital dyserythropoietic anemia type III (CDA III) is a rare autosomal dominant disorder characterized by macrocytic anemia, bone marrow erythroid hyperplasia and giant multinucleate erythroblasts. New evidence suggests that this may be passed on recessively as well.

== Presentation ==
The signs and symptoms of CDA type III tend to be milder than those of the other types. Most affected individuals do not have hepatosplenomegaly, and iron does not build up in tissues and organs. In adulthood, abnormalities of a specialized tissue at the back of the eye (the retina) can cause vision impairment. Some people with CDA type III also have a blood disorder known as monoclonal gammopathy, which can lead to a cancer of white blood cells (multiple myeloma).

== Genetics ==
CDA type III is transmitted autosomal dominantly. The genetic cause of CDA type III is known to be a problem with the KIF23 gene, located on the long arm of chromosome 15 at a position designated 15q22.

Type	OMIM	Gene	Locus
CDAN3	105600	KIF23	15q21

== Treatment ==
Treatment consists of frequent blood transfusions and chelation therapy. Potential cures include bone marrow transplantation and gene therapy.

== See also ==
- Congenital dyserythropoietic anemia
- Hemoglobinopathy
- List of hematologic conditions
- Thalassemia
