= Johanna Rommens =

Canadian molecular biologist

- Education: University of New Brunswick
- Known for: discovery of genes responsible for cystic fibrosis and Shwachman-Diamond syndrome
- Scientific career
- Fields: molecular genetics
- Workplaces: Hospital for Sick Children, SickKids Research Institute, University of Toronto
- Thesis: (1986)
- Academic advisors: Lap-Chee Tsui

Johanna Rommens is a Canadian geneticist who was on the research team which identified and cloned the CFTR gene, which when mutated, is responsible for causing cystic fibrosis (CF). She later discovered the gene responsible for Shwachman-Diamond syndrome, a rare genetic disorder that causes pancreatic and hematologic problems. She is a Senior Scientist Emeritus at SickKids Research Institute and a professor in the Department of Molecular Genetics at the University of Toronto.

== Early life and education ==
Rommens grew up on a farm in eastern New Brunswick, Canada. She earned both her bachelor's degree and a PhD in molecular biology from the University of New Brunswick in Fredericton. She was awarded a Beaverbrook Scholarship for her undergraduate education, and she earned a dual undergraduate degree in biology and organic chemistry. During her graduate education she studied synthetic chemistry in addition to molecular biology, and she received her PhD in 1986. In 1986, she started post-doctoral training in the lab of Lap-Chee Tsui at the Hospital for Sick Children in Toronto, Canada (commonly referred to as SickKids).

== Career ==
Rommens became a senior scientist at the Hospital for Sick Children in Toronto, Canada and a professor at the University of Toronto.

== Research ==
Rommens helped identify the gene behind cystic fibrosis, the CFTR gene (short for cystic fibrosis transmembrane conductance regulator), which was found to be an ion channel. This work was carried out when she was a postdoctoral fellow in the lab of Lap-Chee Tsui at the Hospital for Sick Children (SickKids) in Toronto, Canada, and was a collaboration between Tsui's lab, including fellow postdoctoral researcher Batsheva Kerem, and a team of researchers led by Francis Collins at the University of Michigan. The CFTR gene was discovered through genetic linkage analysis involving looking for genetic markers that were present in patients with cystic fibrosis but not present in their non-affected relatives. Due to the phenomenon of recombination, whereby parts of chromosomes swap homologous segments during germ cell development, each chromosome a child inherits is a mix of the both of that parent's copies of that chromosome. Markers would only be consistently co-inherited with the gene behind cystic fibrosis if they were close together on the chromosome, so Rommens and other researchers used markers to find the approximate location of the gene. They then used a combination of chromosome walking and chromosome hopping or jumping to locate the CF gene, which they named cystic fibrosis transmembrane conductance regulator (CFTR).

Rommens' work on cystic fibrosis didn't stop after she helped identify the CFTR gene. Instead, she continued to research CF once she started her own lab, using her molecular genetics expertise to look outside of the CFTR gene for insight into CF. She helped lead research to discover genetic modifiers of CF - versions of genes other than CFTR that either worsen or ameliorate the effects of CFTR mutations. Such modifiers could help explain why patients with the same CFTR mutations can have differing disease severity. For example, around 15 percent of CF patients are born with an intestinal obstruction called meconium ileus, and, by analyzing genomes from almost 4,000 CF patients, Rommens' team found genetic risk factors associated with developing meconium ileus and lung problems. In addition to using genetics to investigate how multiple genes contribute to CF pathology, she used mouse models to study how mutations in the CFTR gene affect multiple organ systems.

Rommens also investigated the causes of other genetic diseases, chiefly Shwachman-Diamond syndrome (SDS), a rare autosomal recessive genetic disorder that causes pancreatic and hematologic problems. It presents with some of the same symptoms as CF and, after CF, SDS Is the second most common cause of pancreatic insufficiency in children. The pancreas is responsible for producing many digestive enzymes and problems with the pancreas in SDS patients prevent sufficient amounts of these enzymes from reaching the intestines, leading to malabsorption of nutrients. Among other symptoms, the disease often presents with digestive problems, skeletal abnormalities, and frequent infections. In 2002, Rommens discovered that SDS is caused by mutations in the SBDS gene. In addition to the SBDS gene, humans have an SBDS pseudogene (SBDSP), a copy of the SBDS gene which arose via a genetic duplication event, then became inactivated through genetic mutations. Rommens found that patients with SDS had segments of their normal SBDS genes swapped out for the corresponding (mutated) segments of the pseudogene. The most common of the mutations they discovered introduced premature stop codons (PTCs) which led the patients to produce truncated versions of the SBDS protein. This gene was uncharacterized at the time, but Rommens' lab and others would go on to show that, among other potential functions, SBDS is involved in ribosomal maturation. Ribosomes are cellular protein-making complexes, so problems with SBDS could lead to problems with protein synthesis. Rommens helped educate families affected with SDS at a weeklong volunteer-run camp called Camp Sunshine in Casco, Maine.

Rommens also discovered genes implicated in breast and prostate cancer, as well as Alzheimer's disease. She was involved in genetic research on the neurodegenerative disease Huntington's disease as well as Wilson's disease, a copper storage disorder.

== Key publications ==
- Rommens, J.; Iannuzzi, M.; Kerem, B; Drumm, M.; Melmer, G; Dean, M; Rozmahel, R; Cole, J.; Kennedy, D; Hidaka, N; et, al. (1989-09-08). "Identification of the cystic fibrosis gene: chromosome walking and jumping". Science. 245 (4922): 1059–1065. Bibcode:1989Sci...245.1059R. doi:10.1126/science.2772657. ISSN 0036-8075. PMID 2772657.
- Boocock, Graeme R. B.; Morrison, Jodi A.; Popovic, Maja; Richards, Nicole; Ellis, Lynda; Durie, Peter R.; Rommens, Johanna M. (January 2003). "Mutations in SBDS are associated with Shwachman-Diamond syndrome". Nature Genetics. 33 (1): 97–101. doi:10.1038/ng1062. ISSN 1061-4036. PMID 12496757. S2CID 5091627.
