= List of hematologic conditions =

This is an incomplete list, which may never be able to satisfy certain standards for completion.

There are many conditions of or affecting the human hematologic system—the biological system that includes plasma, platelets, leukocytes, and erythrocytes, the major components of blood and the bone marrow.

== Anemias ==
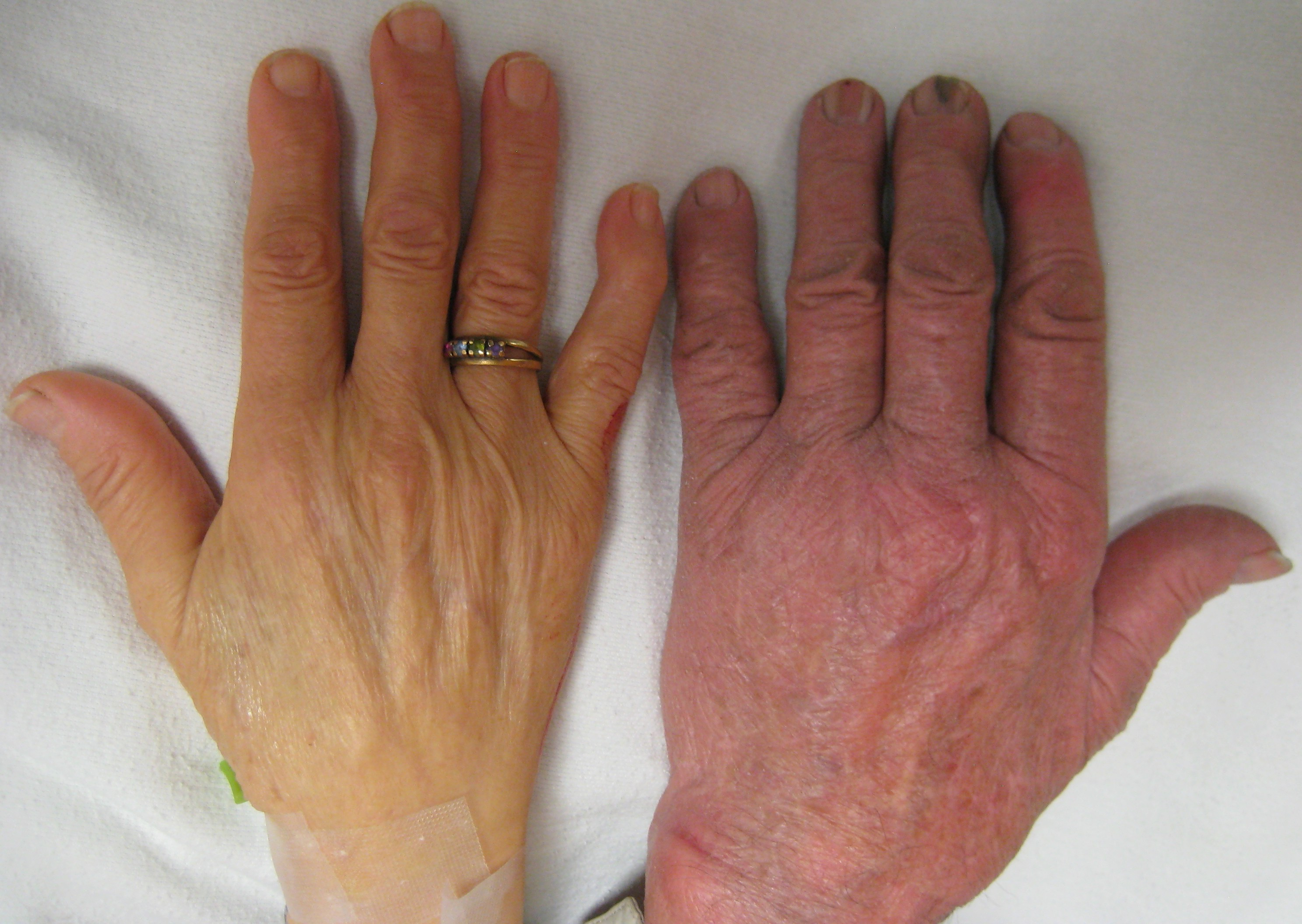
The pale hand of a woman with severe anemia (left) in comparison to the normal hand of her husband (right)

An anemia is a decrease in number of red blood cells (RBCs) or less than the normal quantity of hemoglobin in the blood. However, it can include decreased oxygen-binding ability of each hemoglobin molecule due to deformity or lack in numerical development as in some other types of hemoglobin deficiency.

Anemia is the most common disorder of the blood. There are several kinds of anemia, produced by a variety of underlying causes. Anemia can be classified in a variety of ways, based on the morphology of RBCs, underlying etiologic mechanisms, and discernible clinical spectra, to mention a few. The three main classes of anemia include excessive blood loss (acutely such as a hemorrhage or chronically through low-volume loss), excessive blood cell destruction (hemolysis) or deficient red blood cell production (ineffective hematopoiesis). Based on 2005-2006 estimates, the Centers for Disease Control and Prevention has stated that approximately 5.5 million Americans a year are either admitted to a hospital or seen by a physician, with some form of anemia as their primary diagnosis.

Symptoms of anaemia include Plummer–Vinson syndrome, candidal infections. Altered taste sensation, smooth, red painful burning sensation of tongue, filiform followed by fungiform papillae atrophy may also be seen. Others include generalized stomatitis, angular cheilitis and gingivitis.

Oral manifestation of anemia include angular cheilitis, generalized stomatitis, candidiasis and gingivitis. There will be pallor of lips and oral mucosa. Patients might have a smooth, red painful tongue, experience burning sensation of tongue or disturbed taste sensation. Atrophy of filiform and fungiform papillae may also occur.

=== Nutritional anemias ===
A nutritional anemia is a type of anemia that can be directly attributed to either a nutritional disorder or a nutritional deficiency.

Condition name	ICD-10 coding number	Diseases Database coding number	Medical Subject Headings
Iron-deficiency anemia	D50	6947	
Iron-deficiency anemia (or iron deficiency anaemia) is a common anemia that occurs when iron loss (often from intestinal bleeding or menses) occurs, and/or the dietary intake or absorption of iron is insufficient. In such a state, hemoglobin, which contains iron, cannot be formed.
Plummer–Vinson syndrome	D50.1	10134	
Plummer–Vinson syndrome (PVS), also called Paterson–Brown–Kelly syndrome or sideropenic dysphagia presents as a triad of dysphagia (due to esophageal webs), glossitis, and iron-deficiency anemia. It most usually occurs in postmenopausal women.
Vitamin B12 deficiency anemia	E53.8	13905	
Vitamin B12 deficiency anemia occurs when a "lower-than-normal" amount of the vitamin B12 is available within the body, leading to a decreased production of healthy red blood cells.
Vitamin B12 deficiency anemia due to intrinsic factor deficiency	D51.0		
Vitamin B12 deficiency is caused by a lack of intrinsic factor, as seen in pernicious anemia, causes a vitamin B12 deficiency.
Pernicious anemia	D51.0	9870	
Pernicious anemia (also known as macrocytic achylic anemia, congenital pernicious anemia, juvenile pernicious anemia, and Vitamin B12 deficiency) is one of many types of the larger family of megaloblastic anemias. It is caused by loss of gastric parietal cells, and subsequent inability to absorb vitamin B_{12}. Pernicious anemia is the result of inadequate production of the protein intrinsic factor needed by the body to absorb vitamin B _{12}, causing a reduction of new red blood cells.
Vitamin B 12 deficiency anemia due to selective vitamin B 12 malabsorption with proteinuria			
Vitamin B 12 deficiency anemia due to selective vitamin B 12 malabsorption with proteinuria (also known as Imerslund-Gräsbeck syndrome) is a rare autosomal recessive disorder which requires the indefinite administration of Vitamin B12 injections.
Megaloblastic hereditary anemia	D51.1, D52.0, D53.1	29507	
Megaloblastic anemia (or megaloblastic anaemia) is an anemia (of macrocytic classification) that results from inhibition of DNA synthesis in red blood cell production.
Transcobalamin II deficiency	D51.2		
Transcobalamin II deficiency (TCII) (also known as hereditary transcobalamin II deficiency) is a rare autosomal recessive disorder that results in neurological dysfunction. Transcobalamin II are a type of carrier proteins which bind with plasma vitamin B12 (cobalamin) in the production of red blood cells.
Folate-deficiency anemia	D52 E53.8	4894	
Folate-deficiency anemia (also known as dietary folate-deficiency anemia) is a condition that develops when the body does not have the adequate supply of folic acid available that is needed for the production of new healthy blood cells.
Nutritional megaloblastic anemia	D51.1, D52.0, D53.1	29507	D000749
Nutritional Megaloblastic anemia is an anemia (of macrocytic classification) that results from inhibition of DNA synthesis in red blood cell production.
Drug-induced folate deficiency anemia	D52.1		
Protein-deficiency anemia			
Protein deficiency anemia is an anemia that results from an inadequate intake of dietary protein.
Scurvy	E54	13930	
Scurvy is a disease resulting from a deficiency of vitamin C, which is required for the synthesis of collagen in humans.

=== Non-nutritional (hemolytic, aplastic and other) anemias ===
Condition name	ICD-10 coding number	Diseases Database coding number	Medical Subject Headings
Acanthocytosis			
Acanthocytosis can refer generally to the presence of this type of crenated red blood cell, such as may be found in severe cirrhosis or pancreatitis, but can refer specifically to abetalipoproteinemia, a clinical condition with acanthocytic red blood cells, neurologic problems and steatorrhea. This particular cause of acanthocytosis (also known as abetalipoproteinemia, apolipoprotein B deficiency, and Bassen-Kornzweig syndrome) is a rare, genetically inherited, autosomal recessive condition due to the inability to fully digest dietary fats in the intestines as a result of various mutations of the microsomal triglyceride transfer protein (MTTP) gene.
Acute posthemorrhagic anemia	D62.0		
Acute posthemorrhagic anemia (also known as acute blood loss anemia) is a condition in which a person quickly loses a large volume of circulating hemoglobin. Acute blood loss is usually associated with an incident of trauma or a severe injury resulting in a large loss of blood. It can also occur during or after a surgical procedure.
Alpha-thalassemia	D56.0	448, 33334, 33678	
Alpha-thalassemia (α-thalassemia) is a form of thalassemia involving the genes HBA1 and HBA2. It is condition that causes a reduction of hemoglobin production. There are two types of Alpha-thalassemia, named hemoglobin Bart hydrops fetalis syndrome (also known as Hb Bart syndrome) and HbH disease.
Anemia	D50-D64	663	
Anemia is a type of medical condition that results in a decrease in the number of red blood cells (RBCs) or less than the normal quantity of hemoglobin in the blood.
Anemia of chronic disease			
Anemia of chronic disease (ACD) (also known as anemia of inflammatory response) is a condition where the body converts iron into unused ferrin, causing a drop in hemoglobin production, and as a result; decreased red blood cell production and count. This is caused by a natural defense mechanism initiated by an inflammatory response in response to the underlying chronic disease.
Anemia in kidney disease and dialysis			
Anemia in kidney disease and dialysis results from the diseased kidney's inability to produce enough of the hormone erythropoietin. Erythropoietin is used to stimulate an adequate production of red blood cells from the bone marrow.
Anemia of prematurity	P61.2		
Anemia of prematurity is a form of anemia affecting preterm infants with decreased hematocrit.
Aplastic anemia	D60-D61	866	
Aplastic anemia is a condition where bone marrow does not produce sufficient new cells to replenish blood cells.
Autoimmune hemolytic anemia	D59.0-D59.1		
Autoimmune hemolytic anemia (AIHA) is a type of hemolytic anemia where the body's immune system attacks its own red blood cells (RBCs), leading to their destruction (hemolysis). Types of AIHA include warm autoimmune hemolytic anemia, cold agglutinin disease, and paroxysmal cold hemoglobinuria.
Beta-thalassemia	D56.1	3087	
Beta-thalassemia (β-thalassemia) is an autosomal dominant blood condition that results in the reduction of hemoglobin production. The cause for the disorder is related to a genetic mutation of the HBB gene. This gene is responsible for providing the instructions to produce beta-globin; one of the major components of hemoglobin. The two classification types of beta thalassemia are thalassemia major (also known as Cooley's anemia) and thalassemia intermedia.
Diamond–Blackfan anemia	D61.0	29062	
Diamond–Blackfan anemia (DBA), (also known as Blackfan–Diamond anemia and Inherited erythroblastopenia) is a congenital erythroid aplasia that usually presents in infancy.
Congenital dyserythropoietic anemia	D64.4		
Congenital dyserythropoietic anemia (CDA) is a generically inherited autosomal recessive (types I and II) or autosomal dominant (type III) blood disorder that affects the normal maturation process of red blood cell production. Mutations to the CDAN1 gene (type I), SEC23B gene (type II), and a currently unknown gene for type III causes a disruption in the normal formation of erythropoiesis, thereby causing a reduction of circulating healthy mature red blood cells.
Drug-induced autoimmune hemolytic anemia	D59.0		
Drug-induced autoimmune hemolytic anemia is a type of hemolytic anemia in which a mediated immune response triggers IgG and IgM antibody production in regards to the presence of high doses of penicillin via the hapten mechanism causing the reduction of red blood cells in the spleen.
Drug-induced nonautoimmune hemolytic anemia			
Glucose-6-phosphate dehydrogenase deficiency	D55.0	19674	D005955
Hemoglobinopathy	D58.2	5037	
Hemoglobinopathy is a kind of genetic defect that results in abnormal structure of one of the globin chains of the hemoglobin molecule. Hemoglobinopathies are inherited single-gene disorders; in most cases, they are inherited as autosomal co-dominant traits. Hemoglobinopathies imply structural abnormalities in the globin proteins themselves. Hemoglobinopathy variants include sickle-cell disease.
Hemolytic anemia	D55-D59	5534	
Hemolytic anemia (also known as haemolytic anaemia) is an anemia due to hemolysis, the abnormal breakdown of red blood cells. A number of different mediating factors can cause this condition; either from within the blood cell itself (intrinsic factors) or outside of the cell (extrinsic factors).
Congenital hemolytic anemia			
Fanconi anemia	D61.0	4745	D005199
Fanconi anemia is a rare genetic autosomal recessive aplastic anemia that involves chromosomes 9q and 20q.
Hereditary spherocytosis	D58.0	5827	
Hereditary spherocytosis is a genetically transmitted (autosomal dominant) form of spherocytosis, an auto-hemolytic anemia characterized by the production of red blood cells that are sphere-shaped rather than bi-concave disk shaped (donut-shaped), and therefore more prone to hemolysis.
Hereditary elliptocytosis	D58.1	4172	
Hereditary elliptocytosis (HE) (also known as ovalocytosis), is an inherited blood disorder in which an abnormally large number of circulating red blood cells are elliptical or cigar shaped rather than the typical biconcave disc shape. It is caused in part by mutations in the formation of specific spectrin tetramers or proteins responsible for giving the red blood cell its shape and elasticity causing continued deformation as the cell matures. Subtypes of this condition include southeast Asian ovalocytosis and spherocytic elliptocytosis.
Hereditary pyropoikilocytosis			
Hereditary pyropoikilocytosis (HPP) is an autosomal recessive form of hemolytic anemia which typically presents at infancy or early childhood, characterized by abnormal red blood cell morphology including "budding red cells, fragmented red cells, spherocytes, elliptocytes, triangular cells, and other bizarre-shaped red cells."
Acquired hemolytic anemia			
Cold hemagglutinin disease	D59.1	2949	
Cold hemagglutinin disease (also known as cold agglutinin disease and autoimmune anemia due to cold-reactive antibodies)is an autoimmune disease characterized by the presence of high concentrations of circulating antibodies, usually IgM, directed against red blood cells. It is a form of autoimmune hemolytic anemia, specifically one in which antibodies only bind red blood cells at low body temperatures, typically 28-31 °C.
Paroxysmal cold hemoglobinuria	D59.6	9679	
Paroxysmal cold hemoglobinuria (PCH) (also known as Donath-Landsteiner syndrome) is a rare condition characterized by the sudden presence of hemoglobin in the urine (called hemoglobinuria), typically after exposure to cold temperatures.
Hemolytic-uremic syndrome	D59.3	13052	
Hemolytic-uremic syndrome (HUS) (also known as haemolytic-uraemic syndrome) is a disease characterized by hemolytic anemia, acute renal failure (uremia) and a low platelet count (thrombocytopenia). It predominantly but not exclusively affects children. Most cases are preceded by an episode of diarrhea caused by E. coli O157:H7, which is acquired as a foodborne illness.
Hereditary persistence of fetal hemoglobin			
Hereditary stomatocytosis	D58.8	29710	
Hereditary stomatocytosis is a classification of inherited autosomal dominant human conditions which affect the red blood cell, in which the membrane or outer coating of the cell 'leaks' sodium and potassium ions, causing cell lyses and eventual haemolytic anaemia.
Hexokinase deficiency	D55.2		
Hexokinase deficiency (also known as human erythrocyte hexokinase deficiency) is an anemia-causing condition associated with inadequate hexokinase.
Hyperanaemia			
Hypochromic anemia			
Hypochromic anemia is any type of anemia in which the red blood cells (erythrocytes) are paler than normal. This is caused by a proportionally reduced amount of hemoglobin present in relation to the size of the red blood cell.
Ineffective erythropoiesis			
Ineffective erythropoiesis is an anemia caused by the premature apoptosis of the body's mature red blood cells and subsequent reduction in an adequate production and full maturation of new healthy red blood cells.
Macrocytic anemia			
Megaloblastic anemia	D51.1, D52.0, D53.1	29507	
Megaloblastic anemia (or megaloblastic anaemia) is an anemia of macrocytic classification that results from inhibition of DNA synthesis in red blood cell production.
Microangiopathic hemolytic anemia			
Minkowski-Chauffard syndrome			
Myelophthisic anemia	D61.9		
Myelophthisic anemia (also known as myelophthisis) is a severe kind of anemia found in some people with diseases that affect the bone marrow. Myelophthisis is the displacement of hemopoietic bone-marrow tissue into the peripheral blood, either by fibrosis, tumors or granulomas.
Neuroacanthocytosis		29707	D054546
Neuroacanthocytosis (also known as Levine-Critchley syndrome) is a group of rare, genetic conditions that are characterized by movement disorders and acanthocytosis.
Chorea acanthocytosis		29707	D054546
Chorea-acanthocytosis (ChAc)(also known as Levine-Critchley syndrome, acanthocytosis with neurologic disorder, neuroacanthocytosis, and choreoacanthocytosis) is a rare hereditary disease caused by a mutation of the gene that directs structural proteins in red blood cells. It belongs to a group of four diseases characterized as neuroacanthocytosis.
Non sideropenic hypochromic anaemia			
Normocytic anemia			
A normocytic anemia is an anemia with a mean corpuscular volume (MCV) of 80–100.
Paroxysmal nocturnal hemoglobinuria	D59.5	9688	
Paroxysmal nocturnal hemoglobinuria (also known as Marchiafava-Micheli syndrome) is a rare, acquired, life-threatening blood disease, with anemia due to red blood cell destruction, red urine, and thrombosis.
Pyruvate kinase deficiency	D55.2	11090	
Pyruvate kinase deficiency, also called erythrocyte pyruvate kinase deficiency, is an inherited metabolic disorder of the enzyme pyruvate kinase which affects the survival of red blood cells and causes them to deform into echinocytes on peripheral blood smears.
Rh deficiency syndrome			
Rh deficiency syndrome is a type of hemolytic anemia that involves erythrocytes whom membranes are deficient in Rh antigens. It is considered a rare condition.
Sickle-cell disease			
Sickle cell disease is a group of inherited blood disorders, caused by a genetic abnormality in the oxygen-carrying protein haemoglobin found in red blood cells. Under certain circumstances, this leads to the red blood cells adopting an abnormal sickle-like shape; with this shape, they are unable to deform as they pass through capillaries, causing blockages and consequent tissue damage. Sickled cells are quickly eliminated from the bloodstream, causing anemia.
Sideroblastic anemia	D64.0-D64.3	12110	
Sideroblastic anemia or sideroachrestic anemia is a disease in which the bone marrow produces ringed sideroblasts rather than healthy red blood cells (erythrocytes). It may be caused either by a genetic disorder or indirectly as part of myelodysplastic syndrome.
Southeast Asian ovalocytosis	D58.1	9416	
Southeast Asian ovalocytosis (also known as stomatocytic ovalocytosis, stomatocytic elliptocytosis, and Melanesian ovalocytosis) is a form of hereditary elliptocytosis common in some communities in Malaysia and Papua New Guinea, as it confers some resistance to cerebral falciparum malaria.
Spur cell hemolytic anemia			
Spur cell hemolytic anemia is a form of hemolytic anemia that results when free cholesterol binds to the red blood cell's membrane increasing its surface area, causing later deformities such as rough or thorny projections on the erythrocyte named acanthocytes. This condition is caused by the deceased liver's decreased ability to esterificate cholesterol.
Thalassemia	D56		D013789
Thalassaemia is an inherited blood disorder which is caused by genetic mutations that causes the body to make fewer healthy red blood cells and less hemoglobin due to lack of protein chains.
Triosephosphate isomerase deficiency	D55.2	30116	
Triosephosphate isomerase (TPI) deficiency is a genetically inherited autosomal recessive condition "characterized bychronic hemolytic anemia, cardiomyopathy, susceptibility to infections, severe neurological dysfunction, and, in most cases, death in early childhood."
Warm autoimmune hemolytic anemia	D59.1	29723	
Warm autoimmune hemolytic anemia is an autoimmune hemolytic anemia (AIHA) characterized by formation of antibodies that attack the body's own red blood cells in a destructive immune system response.

== Blood cancers ==
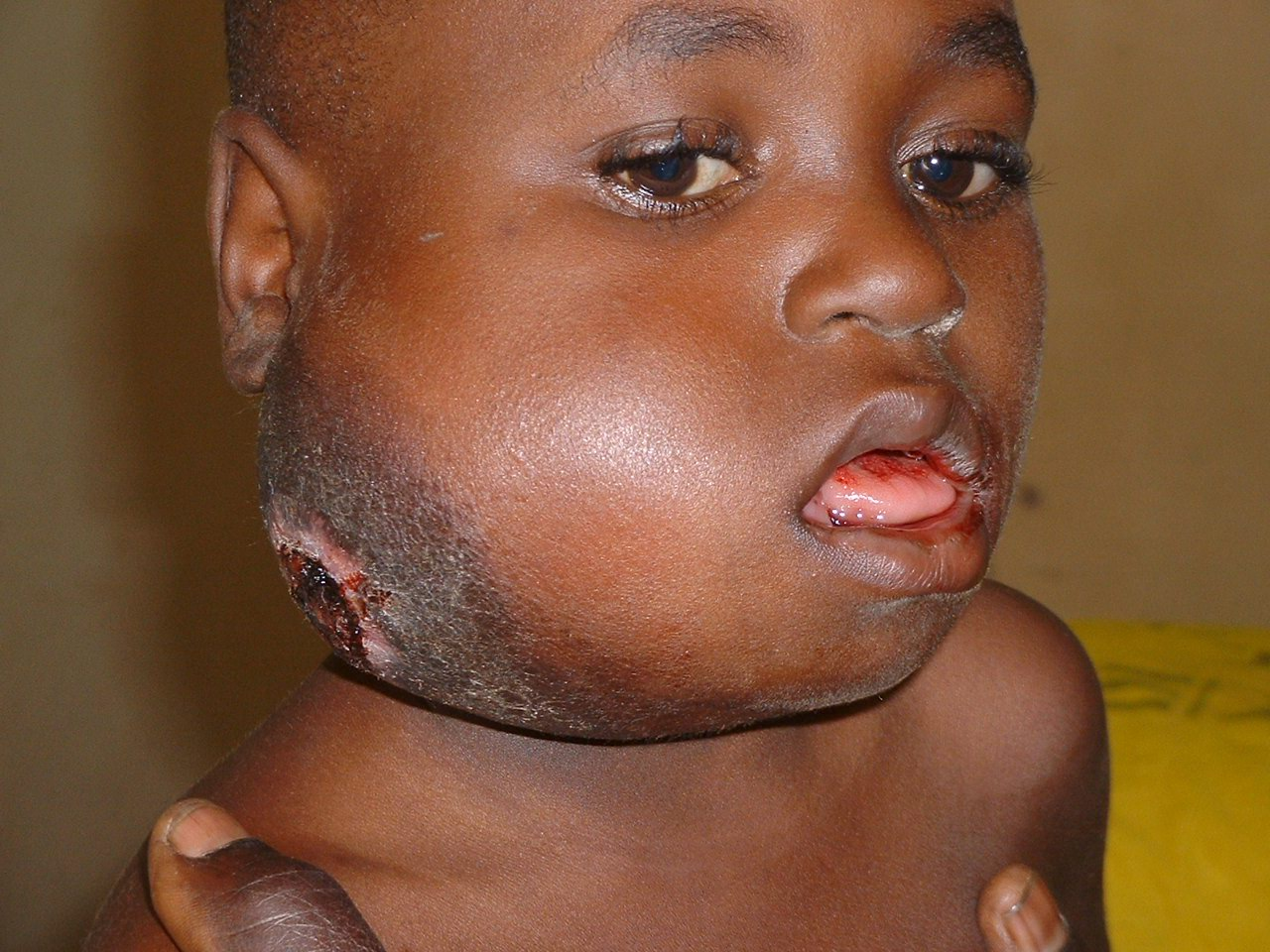
Seven-year-old Nigerian boy with Burkitt's lymphoma presenting with a severely ulcerated and swollen jaw

A blood cancer or hematological malignancy is a type of malignant cancer that originates, affects, or involves the blood, bone marrow, or lymph nodes. These cancers include leukemias, lymphomas, and myelomas. These particular types of cancers can arise as defected mature cell types that have differentiated from hematopoietic precursor cells (often in the bone marrow) and begin to quickly proliferate through the bloodstream where it can then often infiltrate other organs and tissues. Others can involve the formation of tumors from lymphoblasts from within the lymphoid tissue. Incidence of affected people with a form of blood cancer has been steady increasing over recent years; however, due in part to early detection methods and subsequent advancements in the treatment of the diseases, mortality rates have continued to decrease.

=== Lymphoma ===
Condition name	ICD-10 coding number	Diseases Database coding number	Medical Subject Headings
Hodgkin lymphoma	C81	5973	
Non-Hodgkin lymphoma	C82-C85	9065	
The non-Hodgkin lymphomas (NHLs) are a diverse group of blood cancers that include any kind of lymphoma except Hodgkin's lymphomas.
Anaplastic large cell lymphoma			
Angioimmunoblastic T-cell lymphoma	C84.4		
Angioimmunoblastic T-cell lymphoma (AILT) (also known as Angioimmunoblastic lymphadenopathy with dysproteinemia) is a mature T-cell lymphoma with systemic characterized by a polymorphous lymph node infiltrate showing a marked increase in follicular dendritic cells (FDCs) and high endothelial venules (HEVs) and systemic involvement. It is also known as immunoblastic lymphadenopathy (Lukes-Collins Classification) and AILD-type (lymphogranulomatosis X) T-cell lymphoma (Kiel Classification).
Hepatosplenic T-cell lymphoma			
Hepatosplenic T-cell lymphoma is a systemic neoplasm comprising medium-sized cytotoxic T-cells that show a significant sinusoidal infiltration in the liver, spleen, and bone marrow. It is a rare and generally incurable form of lymphoma.
B-cell lymphoma			
reticuloendotheliosis			
reticulosis			
Microglioma			
Diffuse large B-cell lymphoma			
Follicular lymphoma	C82		
Follicular lymphoma (also known as indolent follicular lymphoma) is a type of non-Hodgkin's lymphoma that involves both large and small B-cell lymphocytes that spreads from the lymphatic system and into the blood, bone marrow, and internal organs. Approximately 20 to 30 percent of non-Hodgkin's lymphomas are diagnosed as follicular lymphoma, with a majority of cases involving those 60 years of age or older.
Mucosa-associated lymphatic tissue lymphoma		31339	
Mucosa-associated lymphatic tissue lymphoma (as known as MALT lymphoma and extra-nodal marginal zone lymphoma) is a condition in which lymphatic tissue abnormally presents outside the lymphatic system (extra-nodular) and instead within the mucosa of the gastrointestinal tract, typically as a lesion in the stomach.
B-cell chronic lymphocytic leukemia	C91.1	2641	
B-cell chronic lymphocytic leukemia (also known as small cell lymphocytic lymphoma) is a blood cancer that involves the B-cell lymphocytes; responsible for the creation of antibodies. Of the two general types of chronic lymphocytic leukemias (the other involving T-cells), B-cell chronic lymphocytic leukemia accounts for approximately 95 percent of the diagnoses.
Mantle cell lymphoma	C85.7		
Mantle cell lymphoma (MCL) is a type of B-cell lymphoma and one of the rarest forms of non-Hodgkin's lymphomas comprising approximately 6% of diagnosed cases.
Burkitt lymphoma	C83.7	1784	
Burkitt lymphoma (also known as Burkitt's tumor or malignant lymphoma, Burkitt's type) is a type of B-cell lymphoma that is categorized into one of variant types. These variants are endemic (occurring in equatorial Africa), sporadic ("non-African"), and immunodeficiency-associated (usually associated with HIV).
Mediastinal large B cell lymphoma			
Waldenström's macroglobulinemia	C88.0	14030	
Waldenström's macroglobulinemia (also known as lymphoplasmacytic lymphoma) is a lymphoproliferative disease that involves an abnormal increase of lymphocytes within the bone marrow, creasing disruption of normal red blood cell production.
Nodal marginal zone B cell lymphoma			
Splenic marginal zone lymphoma			
Splenic marginal zone lymphoma (SMZL) (also known as well-differentiated lymphocytic lymphoma, small lymphocytic lymphoma, and splenic lymphoma with circulating villous lymphocytes) is a lymphoma made up of small B-cells that replace the normal architecture of the white pulp of the spleen. The neoplastic cells are both small lymphocytes and larger, transformed blasts, and they invade the mantle zone of splenic follicles and erode the marginal zone, ultimately invading the red pulp of the spleen. Frequently, the bone marrow and splenic hilar lymph nodes are involved along with the peripheral blood.
Intravascular large B-cell lymphoma			
Primary effusion lymphoma		33904	
Primary effusion lymphoma is a condition caused by Kaposi's sarcoma-associated herpesvirus (KSHV).
Lymphomatoid granulomatosis			
Nodular lymphocyte predominant Hodgkin's lymphoma			

=== Leukemia ===
Leukemia is a malignancy producing of white blood cells in bone marrow. It can be a serious disease if not treated early. Sometimes it can be cured by chemotherapy or stem cell treatment. It can affect our bloodstream, skin, lymph nodes, heart, and brain.

Condition name	ICD-10 coding number	Diseases Database coding number	Medical Subject Headings
Plasma cell leukemia	C90.1		D007952
Plasma cell leukemia (PCL), a lymphoproliferative disorder, is a rare cancer involving a subtype of white blood cells called plasma cells.
Acute erythraemia and erythroleukaemia			
Acute erythremic myelosis			
Acute erythroid leukemia	C94.0		
Acute erythroid leukemia (also known as Guglielmo's disease, and acute Di Guglielmo syndrome) is a rare form of acute myeloid leukemia.
Heilmeyer-Schöner disease			
Acute megakaryoblastic leukemia			D007947
Acute megakaryoblastic leukemia (AMKL) is a form of acute myeloid leukemia where megakaryoblasts account for approximately 30% of the nucleated cells within the bone marrow.
Mast cell leukemia			
Panmyelosis	C94.4		
Acute panmyelosis with myelofibrosis	C94.4		
Acute panmyelosis with myelofibrosis (APMF) is a poorly defined disorder that arises as either a clonal disorder, or following toxic exposure to the bone marrow.
Lymphosarcoma cell leukemia			
Acute leukaemia of unspecified cell type			
Blastic phase chronic myelogenous leukemia			
Blastic phase chronic myelogenous leukemia is a phase of chronic myelogenous leukemia in which more than 30% of the cells in the blood or bone marrow are blast cells.
Stem cell leukemia			
Chronic leukaemia of unspecified cell type			
Subacute leukaemia of unspecified cell type			
Accelerated phase chronic myelogenous leukemia			
Acute myeloid leukemia	C92.0	203	
Acute myeloid leukemia (AML), also known as acute myelogenous leukemia, is a cancer of the myeloid line of blood cells, characterized by the rapid growth of abnormal white blood cells that accumulate in the bone marrow and interfere with the production of normal blood cells.
Polycythemia vera			
Acute promyelocytic leukemia			
Acute basophilic leukemia			
Acute eosinophilic leukemia			
Acute lymphoblastic leukemia			
Acute monocytic leukemia			
Acute myeloblastic leukemia with maturation			
Acute myeloid dendritic cell leukemia			
Adult T-cell leukemia/lymphoma			
Aggressive NK-cell leukemia			
B-cell prolymphocytic leukemia			
B-cell chronic lymphocytic leukemia			
B-cell leukemia			
Chronic myelogenous leukemia			
Chronic myelomonocytic leukemia			p
Chronic neutrophilic leukemia			
Chronic lymphocytic leukemia			
Hairy cell leukemia			
Chronic idiopathic myelofibrosis			
Myleofibrosis is one of the myeloproliferative neoplasms.

=== Myeloma ===
Condition name	ICD-10 coding number	Diseases Database coding number	Medical Subject Headings
Multiple myeloma			
Kahler's disease			
Myelomatosis			
Solitary myeloma			
Plasma cell leukemia			
Plasmacytoma, extramedullary			
Malignant plasma cell tumour NOS			
Plasmacytoma NOS			

=== Malignant Immunoproliferative Diseases ===
Condition name	ICD-10 coding number	Diseases Database coding number	Medical Subject Headings
Monoclonal gammopathy			
Multiple Myeloma			
Angiocentric immunoproliferative lesion			
Lymphoid granulomatosis			
Angioimmunoblastic lymphadenopathy			
T-gamma lymphoproliferative disease			
Waldenström's macroglobulinaemia			
Alpha heavy chain disease			
Gamma heavy chain disease			
Franklin's disease			
Immunoproliferative small intestinal disease			
Mediterranean disease			
Malignant immunoproliferative disease, unspecified			
Immunoproliferative disease NOS			

== Coagulation, purpura, and other hemorrhagic conditions ==
is also related with Blood Clot

Condition name	ICD-10 coding number	Diseases Database coding number	Medical Subject Headings
Disseminated intravascular coagulation (DIC, defibrination syndrome)			
Protein C deficiency			
Protein C deficiency is a rare genetic trait that predisposes to thrombotic disease.
Protein S deficiency			
Factor V Leiden			
Thrombocytosis			
Idiopathic thrombocytopenic purpura	D69.3	6673	D016553
Idiopathic thrombocytopenic purpura (ITP) is the condition of having a low platelet count (thrombocytopenia) of no known cause (idiopathic).
Recurrent thrombosis			
Hemophilia			
Hemophilia A			
Hemophilia B			
Hemophilia C			
Von Willebrand disease			
Antiphospholipid syndrome			
Thrombocytopenia			
Glanzmann's thrombasthenia			
Wiskott–Aldrich syndrome			
Thrombotic thrombocytopenic purpura			

== Infection-related ==
Hematological disorders may be caused by a number of infection-related conditions involving the introduction of microorganisms into the host, such as bacteria, viruses, microfilaria, fungus and protozoa.

=== Bacterium-related ===
Condition name	ICD-10 coding number	Diseases Database coding number	Medical Subject Headings
Clostridium infection			
Cholera infection			
E. coli 0157:H7 infection			
Typhoid fever			

=== Protozoan-related ===
Condition name	ICD-10 coding number	Diseases Database coding number	Medical Subject Headings
Leishmania infection			*
Malaria infection (Plasmodium infection)			
Toxoplasmosis			

== Immune system regulation-related ==
=== Immunodeficiency with predominantly antibody defects ===
Condition name	ICD-10 coding number	Diseases Database coding number	Medical Subject Headings
Hereditary hypogammaglobulinemia			
Nonfamilial hypogammaglobulinemia			
Selective deficiency of immunoglobulin A [IgA]			
Selective deficiency of immunoglobulin G [IgG] subclasses			
Selective deficiency of immunoglobulin M [IgM]			
Immunodeficiency with increased immunoglobulin M [IgM]			
Antibody deficiency with near-normal immunoglobulins or with hyperimmunoglobulinemia			
Transient hypogammaglobulinemia of infancy			
