= Spur cell hemolytic anemia =

Medical condition

Spur cell hemolytic anemia, Chronic liver disease impairs the liver's ability to esterify cholesterol, causing free cholesterol to bind to the red cell membrane, increasing its surface area without increasing its volume. This condition also creates rough or thorny projections on the erythrocyte named acanthocytes.

== See also ==
- List of hematologic conditions
- Spur cell
