= Acute panmyelosis with myelofibrosis =

- Specialty: Hematology, oncology
- Frequency: 0.0001%

Acute panmyelosis with myelofibrosis (APMF) is a poorly defined disorder that arises as either a clonal disorder, or following toxic exposure to the bone marrow.

== Signs and symptoms ==
Bone biopsy shows abnormal megakaryocytes, macrocytic erythropoiesis, and defects in neutrophil production and fibrosis of the marrow (myelofibrosis).

Clinically, patients present with reduction in the count of all blood cells (pancytopenia), very few blasts in the peripheral blood, and no or little spleen enlargement (splenomegaly).

Cells are usually CD34 positive.

== Prognosis and treatment ==
Autologous stem cell transplantation has been used in treatment.

== Terminology ==
Controversy remains today whether this disorder is a subtype of acute myeloid leukemia or myelodysplastic syndromes; however, it is currently classified as a form of AML.

== See also ==
- List of hematologic conditions

== See also ==
- Acute myeloid leukemia
- Panmyelosis
- Myelofibrosis
