= Kenneth Blackfan =

American physician

- Born: September 9, 1883; Cambridge, New York, U.S.
- Died: November 29, 1941 (aged 58); Louisville, Kentucky, U.S.
- Education: Albany Medical School
- Medical career
- Profession: Medicine
- Field: Pediatrics
- Institutions: Cincinnati Children's Hospital; Boston Children's Hospital
- Sub-specialties: Hematology

Kenneth Blackfan (September 9, 1883 – November 29, 1941) was an American pediatrician. He took particular interest in nutrition and hematology. A childhood blood disorder, Diamond–Blackfan anemia, is partly named after him. Early in his career, Blackfan did work that identified the origin of cerebrospinal fluid.

== Biography ==
Blackfan was born on September 9, 1883, in Cambridge, New York. He began his medical studies at the Albany Medical College, graduating at the age of only 22. Initially, he returned home to join his father in general practice. He became bored with this, however, and four years later in 1909 he returned to Albany seeking fresh challenges. Encouraged by Richard Pearse, he decided to do some pediatric training in the Founding Hospital in Philadelphia.

He did a residency under John Howland starting in 1911 at Washington University in St. Louis, and in 1913 Blackfan followed Howland to Johns Hopkins Hospital in Baltimore. Here he worked with Walter Dandy (described of the Dandy–Walker syndrome) on internal hydrocephalus. Walker and Blackfan discovered where cerebrospinal fluid originated by tracking dye injected into the cerebral ventricle of a dog.

Blackfan eventually became an associate professor of pediatrics at Johns Hopkins Hospital in 1918, then moved to Cincinnati Children's Hospital Medical Center and finally to Harvard University where he became director of clinical services at Children's Hospital and professor of pediatrics. He occupied this position until his death in 1941.

At Harvard, his main interests were nutrition and hematology. He was Louis K. Diamond’s mentor, and together they wrote the first collection of photographs of microscopic appearances of the Blood in Childhood disease. In 1938, they described Diamond–Blackfan syndrome. He also mentored Sidney Farber, the father of modern cancer chemotherapy, after whom is named the Dana–Farber Cancer Institute in Boston.

Blackfan died of lung cancer in 1941 at the height of his career. Boston Children's Hospital is in front of Blackfan Circle which is named after Blackfan.
