= Acute posthemorrhagic anemia =

- Other names: Acute blood loss anemia
- Specialty: Emergency medicine
- Symptoms: Tiredness , Weakness ,
- Causes: Reticulocytosis

Acute posthemorrhagic anemia or acute blood loss anemia is a condition in which a person quickly loses a large volume of circulating hemoglobin. Acute blood loss is usually associated with an incident of trauma or a severe injury resulting in a large loss of blood. It can also occur during or after a surgical procedure. As this causes a lack of oxygen that can be delivered to the organs, it can lead to hemorrhagic shock and its symptoms, such as: tachycardia; hypotension; pallor and an altered state of mind.

This condition belongs to normocytic and normochromic anemia.

== Treatment ==
The treatments for the acute anaemia are resuscitation and fast replacement of lost blood with packed red blood cells which should aim to increase the level of haematocrit by 3 points and the level of haemoglobin by 1 point. The loss of blood should also be stopped with pressure and, if necessary, tools such as a tourniquet.

== See also ==
- List of circulatory system conditions
- List of hematologic conditions
