= Painful bruising syndrome =

- Other names: Autoerythrocyte sensitization, Gardner–Diamond syndrome, and psychogenic purpura.
- Specialty: Dermatology
- Frequency: 0.0001%

Painful bruising syndrome, also known as autoerythrocyte sensitization, Gardner–Diamond syndrome, and psychogenic purpura, is an idiopathic trauma-induced condition seen in young to middle-aged women who sometimes manifest personality disorders. It is characterized by a distinctive localized purpuric reaction occurring primarily on the legs, face and trunk, with recurring painful ecchymoses variably accompanied by syncope, nausea, vomiting, gastrointestinal and intracranial bleeding.

Patients with this condition can experience frequent painful bruising around joints and muscles. Because of the rarity of the disorder, there are few methods of support in place for patients.

Many patients are labelled with the stigma of having a psychological condition without this having a specifically proven link. There have been cases of painful bruising syndrome reported where there are no additional psychological disorders. This has been known to be put into remission with chemotherapy. It was characterized in 1955 by Frank Gardner and Louis Diamond.

== See also ==
- List of cutaneous conditions
