= Louis Diamond =

American pediatrician

- Born: May 11, 1902; Chişinău, Bessarabia Governorate, Russian Empire
- Died: June 14, 1999 (aged 97); Los Angeles, California, United States
- Education: Harvard Medical School (M.D.)
- Occupation: Pediatrician
- Known for: Father of pediatric hematology
- Awards: John Howland Award

Louis Klein Diamond (Yiddish: לאָויס קלעין דיאַמאָנד; May 11, 1902 – June 14, 1999) was an American pediatrician. He is known as the "father of pediatric hematology".

== Early life and education ==
Diamond was born on May 11, 1902 in Kishinev, then part of the Bessarabia Governorate of the Russian Empire (now Chişinău, Moldova). He was the son of Jewish parents Eliezer Dimant and Lena Klein. His family emigrated to the United States in 1904 following the Kishinev pogrom. He began his medical studies at Harvard University in 1919 and, on graduating in 1923, entered Harvard Medical School, receiving his M.D. in 1927.

== Career ==
Shortly after finishing medical school, Diamond studied briefly with Florence Sabin at the Rockefeller Institute before returning to New England, where he spent several years studying pediatrics at Boston Children's Hospital under the guidance of Dr. Kenneth Blackfan.

Diamond set up one of the first pediatric hematology research centers in the United States at Children's. Focusing on anemias, by 1930, he had succeeded in identifying thalassemia, a hereditary anemia that affected children of Italian and Greek ancestry. In 1932, along with Blackfan, he identified erythroblastosis fetalis, later called hemolytic disease of the newborn, at that time a significant disorder among newborns.

In 1938, Diamond and Blackfan described 4 cases of infant erythroid hypoplastic anemia and which was to become known as Diamond-Blackfan Anemia. He also discovered the blood diseases Gardner–Diamond syndrome, a painful bruising disorder, and Shwachman–Diamond syndrome, a rare genetic disorder that affects many different organs. He invented a Rhesus blood factor test with Neva Abelson (wife of physicist Philip Abelson). He received the John Howland Award, the highest honor bestowed by the American Pediatric Society (APS).

== Death and legacy ==
Diamond died at his home in Los Angeles, California on June 14, 1999, at the age of 97. His son Jared Diamond is a popular science writer and professor of geography at UCLA.
