= Blastic phase chronic myelogenous leukemia =

Advanced phase of chronic myelogenous leukemia

Blastic phase chronic myelogenous leukemia is a phase of chronic myelogenous leukemia in which more than 30% of the cells in the blood or bone marrow are blast cells (immature blood cells). When tiredness, fever, and an enlarged spleen occur during the blastic phase, it is called blast crisis.

== See also ==
- List of hematologic conditions
