= Dyserythropoiesis =

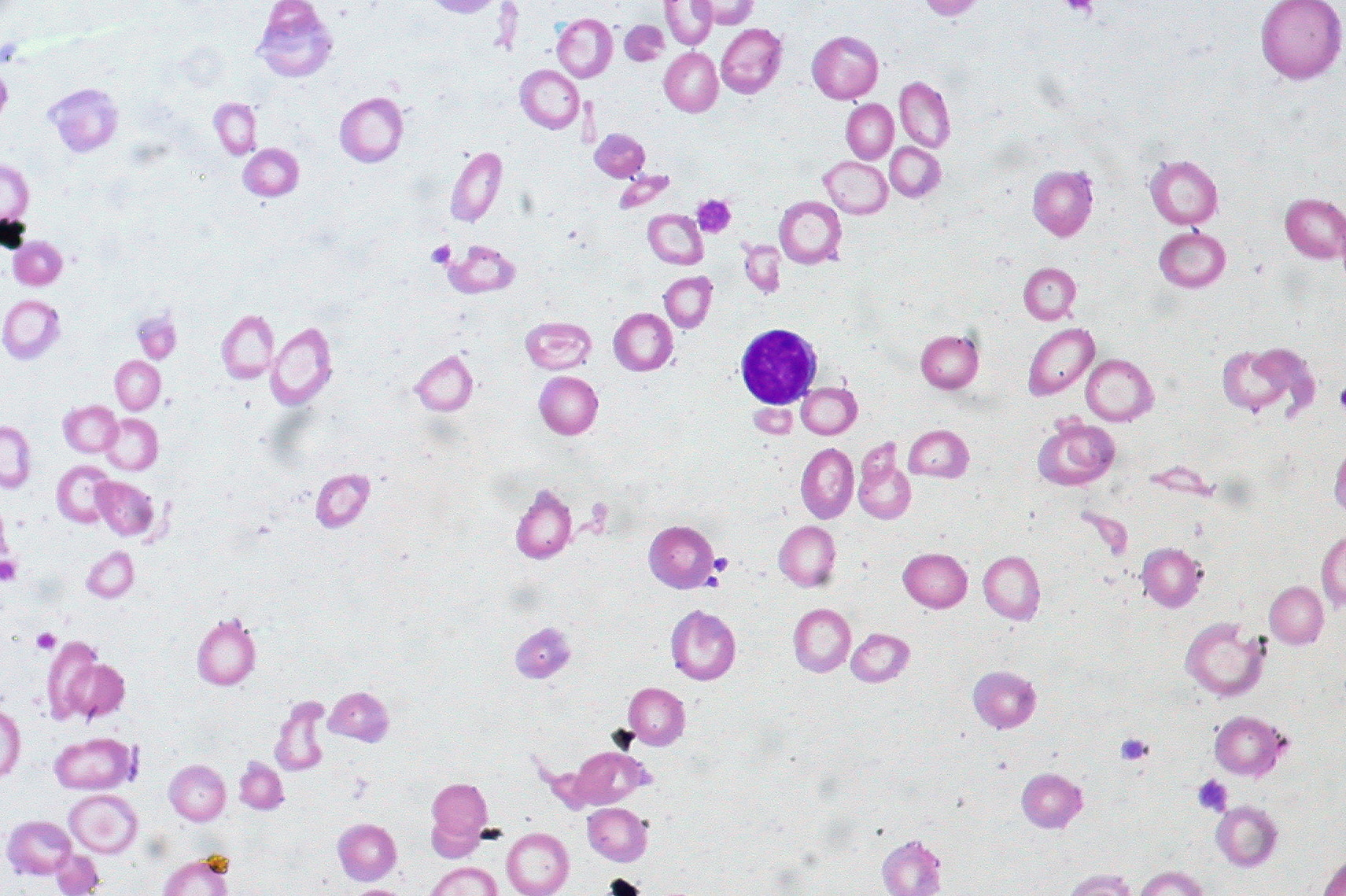
- A peripheral blood smear of a patient with iron-deficiency anemia, an example of an acquired dyserythropoiesis

Dyserythropoiesis refers to the defective development of red blood cells, also called erythrocytes. This problem can be congenital, acquired, or inherited. Some red blood cells may be destroyed within the bone marrow during the maturation process, whereas others can enter the circulation with abnormalities. These abnormalities can be functional and/or morphological, which can lead to anemia since there may be increased turnover of red blood cells. There are a number of diseases that cause dyserythropoiesis. Congenital/inherited causes include congenital dyserythropoietic anemia, thalassemia, pyruvate kinase deficiency, hereditary pyropoikilocytosis, and abetalipoproteinemia. Acquired causes include nutrient deficiency/malnutrition (e.g. cobalamine, folate, and iron), myelodysplasia, HIV infection, and certain medications (e.g. zidovudine).

== See also ==
- Erythropoiesis
- Erythrocyte
- Congenital dyserythropoietic anemia
