= Batsheva Kerem =

Israeli geneticist (born 1955)

- בת-שבע כרם
- Born: March 16, 1955 (age 71); Tel-Aviv, Israel
- Known for: discovery of mutations causing cystic fibrosis
- Spouse: Eitan Kerem
- Scientific career
- Fields: molecular genetics
- Institutions: Hebrew University, Hospital for Sick Children, Israel National Center for CF Genetic Research
- Thesis: (1986)
- Academic advisors: Lap-Chee Tsui

Batsheva Kerem (Hebrew: בת-שבע כרם; born 1955) is an Israeli geneticist who was on the research team that identified and cloned the CFTR gene, which when mutated, is responsible for causing cystic fibrosis (CF). She later established the Israel National Center for CF Genetic Research. She discovered the most prevalent cystic fibrosis-causing mutations among the Israeli population, allowing for the establishment of nationwide genetic screening programs to identify carriers of these mutations and enabling prenatal diagnoses. She researches how some CF mutations prevent CFTR protein production by causing nonsense-mediated decay and abnormal mRNA splicing, and how therapies might be able to counteract those problems. She also studies the role of genetic instability in cancer. She is currently a professor at the Hebrew University.

== Early life and education ==
Batsheva Kerem was born in Tel-Aviv in 1955 and raised in Israel. She served as an IDF officer in the military. She received a B.Sc. with distinction in biology from the Hebrew University in 1979, followed by a Ph.D. from the direct doctoral program of Hebrew University's Department of Genetics in 1986. Her Ph.D work was supervised by Menashe Marcus and Howard Cedar. She did a brief post doctoral fellowship with Tamar Schaap in the Department of Genetics at Jerusalem's Hadassah Medical School, from 1986 to 1987. She then moved to Canada for further postdoctoral training at the Hospital for Sick Children in Toronto, Canada (commonly known as SickKids), where she worked in the laboratory of Lap-Chee Tsui from 1987 to 1990.

== Career ==
Kerem has spent her career at the Hebrew University. She was hired as a senior lecturer in 1990, at which time she established the Israel National Center for CF Genetic Research. She was promoted to associate professor in 1998 and Full Professor in 2003. She established the National Genomic Knowledge Center at Hebrew University's Institute of Life Sciences and served as its chair from 2000-2014. She served as the Head of Authority for research students from 2007-2011. She was appointed President Advisor for Promotion of Women in Science in 2013. She is a member of the European Research Council (ERC) for advanced scientists and has served on the editorial board of the European Journal of Human Genetics and EMBO Reports. She was appointed President of the Genetic Society of Israel in 2007.

== Research ==
Kerem helped identify the gene behind cystic fibrosis, the CFTR gene (short for cystic fibrosis transmembrane conductance regulator), which was found to be an ion channel. This work was carried out when she was a postdoctoral fellow in the lab of Lap-Chee Tsui at the Hospital for Sick Children (SickKids) in Toronto, Canada, and was a collaboration between Tsui's lab, including fellow postdoctoral researcher Johanna Rommens, and a team of researchers led by Francis Collins at the University of Michigan. The CFTR gene was discovered through genetic linkage analysis involving looking for genetic markers that were present in patients with cystic fibrosis but not present in their non-affected relatives. Due to the phenomenon of recombination, whereby parts of chromosomes swap homologous segments during germ cell development, each chromosome a child inherits is a mix of the both of that parent's copies of that chromosome. Markers would only be consistently co-inherited with the gene behind cystic fibrosis if they were close together on the chromosome, so Kerem and other researchers used markers to find the approximate location of the gene. They then used a combination of chromosome walking and chromosome hopping or jumping to locate the CF gene, which they named cystic fibrosis transmembrane conductance regulator (CFTR). Kerem helped identify the globally most common CFTR mutation, F508del, a deletion of the 508th amino acid (protein letter) in the CFTR protein, which is normally a phenylalanine (abbreviated F).

Part of her work at SickKids involved examining blood samples sent from around the world and, when looking at the CFTR gene in samples sent from Israeli patients, she found that they didn't carry any of the previously-identified mutations. She became intrigued so, when she moved back to Israel in September 1990, she collected blood from most Israeli CF patients and searched their CFTR genes for mutations. She discovered that about 60% of Israel's Ashkenazi Jewish CF patients had a nonsense mutation abbreviated as W1282X (signifying that the genetic instructions for 1282rd amino acid in the protein, which is normally a tryptophan (W), has been mutated to a stop signal (X)). This early stop signal, a premature termination codon (PTC), caused the production of truncated, dysfunctional CFTR protein. She published this finding in 1992 and in 1997, Israel's government introduced population carrier screening for it.

Much of Kerem's later contributions to cystic fibrosis research involves studying defects in the production of CFTR caused by premature termination and improper RNA splicing. In order to make a protein, a cell first makes RNA copies of the DNA gene for that protein. These RNA copies contain regulatory regions called introns which are removed in a process called RNA splicing in order to produce mature messenger RNAs (mRNAs) which are used by the cell's protein-making machinery (ribosomes and helpers) to make the corresponding protein in a process called translation. Certain CF-causing mutations, instead of affecting the CFTR protein's shape and functioning, affect how the messenger RNA (mRNA) copies of the genetic recipe for CFTR are processed, thus preventing CFTR protein from being made.

In addition to identifying and classifying the wide spectrum of CFTR mutations, Kerem studies how therapies might be able to counteract the problems present among the various classes. For example, Kerem researches how pharmaceutical compounds that promote read-through of these stop codons might be able to counteract problems caused by premature termination codon (PTC) mutations such as the W1282X she discovered was common among Ashkenazi Jewish patients. Additionally, she invented a discovery platform which serves as the basis of the biotechnology company SpliSense, which is working to develop antisense oligonucleotides (ASOs) to counteract mRNA splicing mutations by using small segments of DNA complementary to specific regions of the RNA in order to hide improper splice sites and promote proper splicing.

In the late 1990s she began studying chromosome structure and function. She has investigated genome instability and made significant contributions to knowledge of the involvement of frequent fragile sites in cancer.

== Personal life ==
Batsheva Kerem is married to Dr. Eitan Kerem, head of the Division of Paediatrics at the Hadassah Medical Organization, who also researches cystic fibrosis. They have carried out collaborative research together, including the development of potential therapeutics. The reason Batsheva chose a postdoctoral fellowship in Tsui's lab at SickKids was in part because she and Eitan were looking for job opportunities where they would be able to work nearby one another. She carried out her groundbreaking CF research in Tsui's lab while a mother to two children. Batsheva has spoken out about gender inequality in science and, when she was one of the few women to receive an EMET Prize, she used the opportunity to advocate for better representation of women among prize recipients.

== Honors ==
- Julodan Prize for Contribution to Medicine (1993)
- Teva Prize for Excellence in Human Genome Research (1993)
- Joels Senior Lectureship for Excellence in Science (1996)
- Abisch-Frenkel Prize for Excellence in Life Sciences (2004)
- EMET Prize Laureate – Life Sciences: Genetics (2008)

== Key publications ==
- Kerem, B; Rommens, J.; Buchanan, J.; Markiewicz, D; Cox, T.; Chakravarti, A; Buchwald, M; Tsui, L. (1989-09-08). "Identification of the cystic fibrosis gene: genetic analysis". Science. 245 (4922): 1073–1080. Bibcode:1989Sci...245.1073K. doi:10.1126/science.2570460. ISSN 0036-8075. PMID 2570460. S2CID 86352511.
