= Accelerated phase chronic myelogenous leukemia =

- Specialty: Hematology and oncology

Accelerated phase chronic myelogenous leukemia is a phase of chronic myelogenous leukemia in which the disease is progressing.It is characterized by an increase in blast cells in the blood and bone marrow, driven by the constitutively active tyrosine kinase produced by the Philadelphia chromosome (BCR-ABL1 gene fusion).

== Symptoms ==
Common symptoms include fever, bone pain, and swollen spleen.

== Treatment ==
Patients treated with imatinib, dasatinib, and nilotinib have shown meaningful rates of hematologic and cytogenetic response.

== Prognosis ==
Prognosis is very poor once chronic myelogenous leukemia reaches the accelerated phase; it behaves similarly to acute myeloid leukemia.
