= TSR2 (gene) =

Protein-coding gene in humans

Identifiers
- Aliases: TSR2, DT1P1A10, WGG1, DBA14, ribosome maturation factor, TSR2 ribosome maturation factor
- External IDs: OMIM: 300945; MGI: 1916749; GeneCards: TSR2

Gene location (Human)
Chr.	X chromosome (human)
Band	Xp11.22	Start	54,440,404 bp
Band	Xp11.22	End	54,448,032 bp

Gene location (Mouse)
Chr.	X chromosome (mouse)
Band	X|X F3	Start	149,870,090 bp
Band	X|X F3	End	149,879,539 bp
RNA expression pattern
Bgee	Human / Mouse (ortholog); Top expressed in: tendon of biceps brachii; internal globus pallidus; C1 segment; putamen; amygdala; optic nerve; inferior olivary nucleus; dorsal motor nucleus of vagus nerve; nucleus accumbens; pons / Top expressed in: dentate gyrus of hippocampal formation granule cell; Region I of hippocampus proper; primitive streak; neural layer of retina; arcuate nucleus; suprachiasmatic nucleus; substantia nigra; paraventricular nucleus of hypothalamus; ectoderm; otic placode; More reference expression data
BioGPS	n/a
Gene ontology
Molecular function	protein binding
Cellular component	nucleus
Biological process	maturation of SSU-rRNA from tricistronic rRNA transcript (SSU-rRNA, 5.8S rRNA, LSU-rRNA); rRNA processing
Sources:Amigo / QuickGO
Orthologs
Databases	NCBI: entry; OMA: entry
Species	Human	Mouse
Entrez	90121	69499
Ensembl	ENSG00000158526	ENSMUSG00000025264
UniProt	Q969E8	Q8C8T8
RefSeq (mRNA)	NM_001346789; NM_001346790; NM_001346791; NM_001346792; NM_058163	NM_001164578; NM_175146
RefSeq (protein)	NP_001333718; NP_001333719; NP_001333720; NP_001333721; NP_477511	NP_001158050; NP_780355
Location (UCSC)	Chr X: 54.44 – 54.45 Mb	Chr X: 149.87 – 149.88 Mb
PubMed search
- Wikidata
View/Edit Human	View/Edit Mouse

TSR2 ribosome maturation factor is a protein that in humans is encoded by the TSR2 gene.

== Function ==
The protein encoded by this gene appears to repress the transcription of NF-kappaB and may be involved in apoptosis. Defects in this gene are a cause of Diamond-Blackfan anemia. [provided by RefSeq, Oct 2016].
