= Shwachman–Diamond syndrome =

- Other names: Shwachman–Bodian–Diamond syndrome
- Shwachman–Diamond syndrome is inherited in an autosomal recessive pattern.
- Specialty: Medical genetics
- Prognosis: five-year survival rate 64%
- Frequency: 122,600
- Deaths: 21,650

Shwachman–Diamond syndrome (SDS), or Shwachman–Bodian–Diamond syndrome, is a rare congenital disorder characterized by exocrine pancreatic insufficiency, bone marrow dysfunction, skeletal and cardiac abnormalities and short stature. After cystic fibrosis (CF), it is the second most common cause of exocrine pancreatic insufficiency in children. It is associated with the SBDS gene and has autosomal recessive inheritance.

== Signs and symptoms ==
The syndrome shows a wide range of abnormalities and symptoms. The main characteristics of the syndrome are exocrine pancreatic dysfunction, hematologic abnormalities and growth retardation. Only the first two of these are included in the clinical diagnostic criteria.

- Hematologic abnormalities: neutropenia may be intermittent or persistent and is the most common hematological finding. Low neutrophil counts leave patients at risk of developing severe recurrent infections that may be life-threatening. Anemia (low red blood cell counts) and thrombocytopenia (low platelet counts) may also occur. Bone marrow is typically hypocellular, with maturation arrest in the myeloid lineages that give rise to neutrophils, macrophages, platelets and red blood cells. Patients may also develop progressive marrow failure or transform to acute myelogenous leukemia.
- Exocrine pancreatic dysfunction: Pancreatic exocrine insufficiency arises due to a lack of acinar cells that produce digestive enzymes. These are extensively depleted and replaced by fat. A lack of pancreatic digestive enzymes leaves patients unable to digest and absorb fat. However, pancreatic status may improve with age in some patients.
- Growth retardation: More than 50% of patients are below the third percentile for height, and short stature appears to be unrelated to nutritional status. Other skeletal abnormalities include metaphyseal dysostosis (45% of patients), thoracic dystrophy (rib cage abnormalities in 46% of patients) and costochondral thickening (shortened ribs with flared ends in 32% of patients). Skeletal problems are one of the most variable components of SDS, with 50% affected siblings from the same family discordant for clinical presentation or type of abnormality. Despite this, a careful review of radiographs from 15 patients indicated that all of them had at least one skeletal anomaly, though many were subclinical.
- Other features include metaphyseal dysostosis, mild hepatic dysfunction, increased frequency of infections.

== Genetics ==
Shwachman–Diamond syndrome is characterized by an autosomal recessive mode of inheritance. The gene that is mutated in this syndrome, SBDS, lies on the long arm of chromosome 7 at cytogenetic position 7q11. It is composed of five exons and has an associated mRNA transcript that is 1.6 kilobase pairs in length. The SBDS gene resides in a block of genomic sequence that is locally duplicated on the chromosome. The second copy contains a non-functional version of the SBDS gene that is 97% identical to the original gene, but has accumulated inactivating mutations over time. It is considered to be a pseudogene. In a study of 158 SDS families, 75% of disease-associated mutations appeared to be the result of gene conversion, while 89% of patients harbored at least one such mutation. Gene conversion occurs when the intact SBDS gene and its pseudogene copy aberrantly recombine at meiosis, leading to an incorporation of pseudogene-like sequences into the otherwise functional copy of the SBDS gene, thereby inactivating it.

Two gene conversion mutations predominate in SDS patients. One is a splice site mutation affecting the 5' splice site of intron two, while the second is an exon two nonsense mutation. The marked absence of patients homozygous for the otherwise common nonsense mutation suggested that the SBDS gene is essential. Consistent with this, knockout of the mouse gene leads to early embryonic lethality. This, in turn, suggests that the common splice site mutation seen in patients may be hypomorphic, i.e. that it results in only a partial loss of function, whereas the complete loss of SBDS function is likely to be lethal.

== Mechanisms ==
The SBDS gene is expressed in all tissues and encodes a protein of 250 amino acid residues. A great deal of indirect evidence suggested that the SBDS protein may be involved in an aspect of cellular RNA metabolism or ribosome assembly or function. The wide occurrence of the gene in all archaea and eukaryotes supported a role for this protein in a very fundamental and evolutionarily conserved aspect of cellular biology. The homologous genes in archaea also tend to be present in conserved cluster enriched for RNA processing and ribosomal genes. A specific function for SBDS in RNA metabolism or ribosome assembly or function is further supported by its localization to the nucleolus, the nuclear subdomain where these processes occur. In line with this, the yeast homologue, SdoI, has been shown to be critical for maturation of pre-60S ribosomes, by effecting release and recycling of the nucleolar shuttling factor Tif6. This is required for 60S maturation and translational activation of ribosomes. It has also been shown that the Dictyostelium discoideum homologue catalyzes the removal of eukaryotic initiation factor 6 (eIF6), which is required for the translational activation of ribosomes. Cells from SDS patients were shown to have a defect in assembly of ribosome subunits.

At present, it is not obvious how disruption of the basic cellular process of translation leads to the tissue- and organ-specific manifestations seen in SDS. However, unusual and combinations of tissues and organs are also affected in Diamond–Blackfan anemia, X-linked dyskeratosis congenita, and cartilage–hair hypoplasia—three diseases that may also be linked to defective ribosome function. Pleiotropic disease features may be the result of cell-specific effects of reduced levels of SBDS activity provided by hypomorphic mutations.

== Diagnosis ==
Initially, the clinical presentation of SDS may appear similar to cystic fibrosis. However, CF can be excluded with a normal chloride in sweat test but faecal elastase as a marker of pancreatic function will be reduced. The variation, intermittent nature, and potential for long-term improvement of some clinical features make this syndrome difficult to diagnose. SDS may present with either malabsorption, or hematological problems. Rarely, SDS may present with skeletal defects, including severe rib cage abnormalities that lead to difficulty in breathing. Diagnosis is generally based on evidence of exocrine pancreatic dysfunction and neutropenia. Skeletal abnormalities and short stature are characteristics that can be used to support the diagnosis. The gene responsible for the disease has been identified and genetic testing is now available.

== Management ==
Pancreatic exocrine insufficiency may be treated through pancreatic enzyme supplementation, while severe skeletal abnormalities may require surgical intervention. Neutropenia may be treated with granulocyte-colony stimulating factor (GCSF) to boost peripheral neutrophil counts. However, there is ongoing and unresolved concern that this drug could contribute to the development of leukemia. Signs of progressive marrow failure may warrant bone marrow transplantation (BMT). This has been used successfully to treat hematological aspects of disease. However, SDS patients have an elevated occurrence of BMT-related adverse events, including graft-versus-host disease (GVHD) and toxicity relating to the pre-transplant conditioning regimen. In the long run, study of the gene that is mutated in SDS should improve understanding of the molecular basis of disease. This, in turn, may lead to novel therapeutic strategies, including gene therapy and other gene- or protein-based approaches.

== Research ==
A major goal of curative therapy for SDS is to reduce the risk of bone marrow failure and halt the progression of malignant transformation toward myelodysplastic syndrome (MDS) and acute myeloid leukemia (AML), the most detrimental complications of SDS. Currently, there is no such therapy. However, several emerging therapeutic strategies, including gene therapy and antisense oligonucleotides (ASOs), could potentially slow or prevent malignant transformation, at least in theory. These new therapies have been proven effective for several rare diseases, including metachromatic leukodystrophy and spinal muscular atrophy. Several SDS patient groups are advocating for better therapies for SDS, and one organization is focused on driving the therapy development efforts. The challenge is whether the SDS community can come together to support the required research, and whether the organizations can successfully execute a strategy that coordinates the efforts for new therapy development.

== Epidemiology ==
It is thought to have an estimated incidence of 1 in 75,000 people.

== History ==
The disease was first described as a coherent clinical entity in May 1964 by Bodian, Sheldon, and Lightwood. It was subsequently described by Shwachman, Diamond, Oski, and Khaw in November of the same year. In 2001, linkage analysis in SDS families indicated that affected gene mapped to a large region of human chromosome seven. In 2002, this interval was refined to a region on the long arm of the chromosome next to the centromere.

In 2003, a team of researchers led by Johanna Rommens at the Hospital of Sick Children (SickKids) in Toronto, Canada, discovered mutations in the SBDS gene (Shwachman–Bodian–Diamond syndrome) were associated with disease.

== Eponym ==
Shwachman–Diamond syndrome, less commonly known as Shwachman–Bodian–Diamond syndrome, is named for Harry Shwachman (1910 – September 12, 1986), an American physician, Martin Bodian (1912 – May 12, 1994), a British ophthalmologist who worked in New York City, and Louis Klein Diamond (May 11, 1902 – June 14, 1999), an American pediatrician.
