= Codanin-1 =

Protein-coding gene in humans

CDAN1

Identifiers
- Aliases: CDAN1, CDA1, CDAI, CDAN1A, DLT, PRO1295, codanin 1
- External IDs: OMIM: 607465; MGI: 1916218; GeneCards: CDAN1

Gene location (Human)
Chr.	Chromosome 15 (human)
Band	15q15.2	Start	42,723,544 bp
Band	15q15.2	End	42,737,128 bp

Gene location (Mouse)
Chr.	Chromosome 2 (mouse)
Band	2|2 E5	Start	120,546,635 bp
Band	2|2 E5	End	120,680,609 bp
RNA expression pattern
Bgee	Human / Mouse (ortholog); Top expressed in: ventricular zone; sural nerve; left ovary; right ovary; right hemisphere of cerebellum; canal of the cervix; body of uterus; left testis; ganglionic eminence; right testis / Top expressed in: spermatocyte; neural layer of retina; thymus; morula; morula; ventricular zone; spermatid; otic vesicle; gastrula; epiblast; More reference expression data
BioGPS	n/a
Gene ontology
Molecular function	protein binding
Cellular component	cytoplasm; integral component of membrane; plasma membrane; membrane; endomembrane system; nucleus; cytosol
Biological process	protein localization; negative regulation of DNA replication; chromatin organization
Sources:Amigo / QuickGO
Orthologs
Databases	NCBI: entry; OMA: entry
Species	Human	Mouse
Entrez	146059	68968
Ensembl	ENSG00000140326	ENSMUSG00000027284
UniProt	Q8IWY9	Q8CC12
RefSeq (mRNA)	NM_138477	NM_026891
RefSeq (protein)	NP_612486	NP_081167
Location (UCSC)	Chr 15: 42.72 – 42.74 Mb	Chr 2: 120.55 – 120.68 Mb
PubMed search
- Wikidata
View/Edit Human	View/Edit Mouse

Codanin-1 is a protein that in humans is encoded by the CDAN1 gene. This protein appears to play a role in nuclear envelope integrity, possibly related to microtubule attachments. Mutations in this gene cause congenital dyserythropoietic anemia type I, a disease resulting in morphological and functional abnormalities of erythropoiesis.
