= 40S ribosomal protein S19 =

Protein-coding gene in the species Homo sapiens

RPS19

Identifiers
- Aliases: RPS19, DBA, DBA1, S19, Ribosomal protein S19, eS19, LOH19CR1
- External IDs: OMIM: 603474; MGI: 1333780; GeneCards: RPS19
Available structures
PDB	Ortholog search: PDBe RCSB
PDB	List of PDB id codes 4UG0, 4V6X, 5A2Q, 5AJ0, 5FLX, 3J7R, 4D61, 4D5L, 4UJD, 3J7P, 4UJE, 4UJC

Gene location (Human)
Chr.	Chromosome 19 (human)
Band	19q13.2	Start	41,860,255 bp
Band	19q13.2	End	41,872,925 bp

Gene location (Mouse)
Chr.	Chromosome 7 (mouse)
Band	7|7 A3	Start	24,884,371 bp
Band	7|7 A3	End	24,889,806 bp
RNA expression pattern
Bgee	Human / Mouse (ortholog); Top expressed in: skin of thigh; skin of hip; right uterine tube; granulocyte; human penis; gingival epithelium; embryo; vulva; nipple; skin of abdomen / Top expressed in: blastocyst; ventricular zone; embryo; embryo; ganglionic eminence; uterus; morula; lip; bone marrow; neural tube; More reference expression data
BioGPS	n/a
Gene ontology
Molecular function	protein kinase binding; protein homodimerization activity; fibroblast growth factor binding; structural constituent of ribosome; protein binding; RNA binding
Cellular component	extracellular exosome; ribosome; nucleolus; cytoplasm; nucleus; membrane; focal adhesion; intracellular anatomical structure; cytosolic small ribosomal subunit; cytosol; extracellular matrix; nucleoplasm; postsynaptic density; synapse
Biological process	Notch signaling pathway; SRP-dependent cotranslational protein targeting to membrane; negative regulation of respiratory burst involved in inflammatory response; viral transcription; monocyte chemotaxis; nuclear-transcribed mRNA catabolic process, nonsense-mediated decay; ribosomal small subunit assembly; response to extracellular stimulus; positive regulation of respiratory burst involved in inflammatory response; nucleolus organization; protein tetramerization; maturation of SSU-rRNA from tricistronic rRNA transcript (SSU-rRNA, 5.8S rRNA, LSU-rRNA); translational initiation; erythrocyte differentiation; maturation of SSU-rRNA; ribosomal small subunit biogenesis; protein biosynthesis; rRNA processing; antimicrobial humoral immune response mediated by antimicrobial peptide
Sources:Amigo / QuickGO
Orthologs
Databases	NCBI: entry; OMA: entry
Species	Human	Mouse
Entrez	6223	20085
Ensembl	ENSG00000105372	ENSMUSG00000040952
UniProt	P39019	Q9CZX8
RefSeq (mRNA)	NM_001022; NM_001321483; NM_001321484; NM_001321485	NM_023133
RefSeq (protein)	NP_001013; NP_001308412; NP_001308413; NP_001308414	NP_075622; NP_001347044; NP_001347045; NP_001347047; NP_001347048 NP_001347054; NP_001347057
Location (UCSC)	Chr 19: 41.86 – 41.87 Mb	Chr 7: 24.88 – 24.89 Mb
PubMed search
- Wikidata
View/Edit Human	View/Edit Mouse

40S ribosomal protein S19 is a protein that in humans is encoded by the RPS19 gene.

== Function ==
Ribosomes, the organelles that catalyze protein synthesis, consist of a small 40S subunit and a large 60S subunit. Together these subunits are composed of 4 RNA species and approximately 80 structurally distinct proteins. This gene encodes a ribosomal protein that is a component of the 40S subunit. The protein belongs to the S19E family of ribosomal proteins. It is located in the cytoplasm. As is typical for genes encoding ribosomal proteins, there are multiple processed pseudogenes of this gene dispersed through the genome.

== Clinical significance ==
Mutations in this gene cause Diamond–Blackfan anemia (DBA), a constitutional erythroblastopenia characterized by absent or decreased erythroid precursors, in a subset of patients. This suggests a possible extra-ribosomal function for this gene in erythropoietic differentiation and proliferation, in addition to its ribosomal function. Higher expression levels of this gene in some primary colon carcinomas compared to matched normal colon tissues has been observed.

== Interactions ==
Ribosomal protein S19 has been shown to interact with basic fibroblast growth factor. RPS19 is also secreted extracellularly and its extracellular oligomers (crosslinked by the transglutaminase Coagulation factor XIII) is also known to bind and probably inhibit Macrophage migration inhibitory factor; though S19 oligomers themselves share MCIP's function as another very strong macrophage chemoattractant and bind to anaphylotoxin C5 receptor
