= 40S ribosomal protein S28 =

Protein-coding gene in the species Homo sapiens

RPS28

Identifiers
- Aliases: RPS28, S28, DBA15, ribosomal protein S28, eS28
- External IDs: OMIM: 603685; MGI: 1859516; GeneCards: RPS28
Available structures
PDB	Ortholog search: PDBe RCSB
PDB	List of PDB id codes 4UG0, 4V6X, 5A2Q, 5AJ0, 3J7P, 4KZX, 4UJE, 4KZY, 4D5L, 4KZZ, 3J7R, 4UJD, 5FLX, 4D61, 4UJC

Gene location (Human)
Chr.	Chromosome 19 (human)
Band	19p13.2	Start	8,321,158 bp
Band	19p13.2	End	8,323,340 bp

Gene location (Mouse)
Chr.	Chromosome 17 (mouse)
Band	17|17 B1	Start	34,038,001 bp
Band	17|17 B1	End	34,043,536 bp
RNA expression pattern
Bgee	Human / Mouse (ortholog); Top expressed in: mucosa of transverse colon; anterior pituitary; granulocyte; stromal cell of endometrium; skin of abdomen; olfactory zone of nasal mucosa; gonad; right uterine tube; body of pancreas; left ovary / Top expressed in: yolk sac; embryo; embryo; ventricular zone; ganglionic eminence; uterus; bone marrow; dentate gyrus of hippocampal formation granule cell; blastocyst; urinary bladder; More reference expression data
BioGPS	n/a
Gene ontology
Molecular function	structural constituent of ribosome; protein binding; RNA binding
Cellular component	cytosol; ribosome; intracellular anatomical structure; small ribosomal subunit; extracellular exosome; nucleoplasm; cytosolic small ribosomal subunit; cytoplasm; endoplasmic reticulum; rough endoplasmic reticulum; polysomal ribosome; cytoplasmic side of rough endoplasmic reticulum membrane
Biological process	ribosome biogenesis; viral transcription; SRP-dependent cotranslational protein targeting to membrane; translational initiation; nuclear-transcribed mRNA catabolic process, nonsense-mediated decay; ribosomal small subunit biogenesis; ribosomal small subunit assembly; maturation of SSU-rRNA; protein biosynthesis; rRNA processing; cytoplasmic translation
Sources:Amigo / QuickGO
Orthologs
Databases	NCBI: entry; OMA: entry
Species	Human	Mouse
Entrez	6234	54127
Ensembl	ENSG00000233927	ENSMUSG00000067288
UniProt	P62857	P62858
RefSeq (mRNA)	NM_001031	NM_016844; NM_001355384
RefSeq (protein)	NP_001022	NP_058540; NP_001342313
Location (UCSC)	Chr 19: 8.32 – 8.32 Mb	Chr 17: 34.04 – 34.04 Mb
PubMed search
- Wikidata
View/Edit Human	View/Edit Mouse

40S ribosomal protein S28 is a protein that in humans is encoded by the RPS28 gene.

Ribosomes, the organelles that catalyze protein synthesis, consist of a small 40S subunit and a large 60S subunit. Together these subunits are composed of 4 RNA species and approximately 80 structurally distinct proteins. This gene encodes a ribosomal protein that is a component of the 40S subunit. The protein belongs to the S28E family of ribosomal proteins. It is located in the cytoplasm. As is typical for genes encoding ribosomal proteins, there are multiple processed pseudogenes of this gene dispersed through the genome.
