= Non-sideropenic hypochromic anaemia =

- Other names: Normochromic Normocytic Anemia

Non-sideropenic hypochromic anemia also known as Normochromic Normocytic Anemia is a kind of anemia in which the red blood cells in circulation have a normal red color (normochromic) and the same size (normocytic). Normocytic normochromic anemia is most commonly caused by a variety of chronic infections and systemic diseases.Normocytic normochromic anemia differs from other types of anemia in that the RBCs' average size and hemoglobin content are usually within normal limits. Under microscopic examination, RBCs typically resemble normal cells, though there may be variations in shape and size that equalize each other, resulting in average values within the normal range.

== Signs and symptoms ==
Depending on the cause, symptoms of normocytic anemia can develop slowly. The primary signs of normocytic normochromic anemia, or any type of anemia, are generalized weakness and a pale complexion.

== Causes ==
The cause of normocytic normochromic anemia is determined by whether the anemia is hypoproliferative (i.e., corrected reticulocyte count less than 2%) or hyperproliferative (i.e., corrected reticulocyte count greater than 2%).The majority of normochromic, normocytic anemias are caused by other diseases; a small percentage is caused by a primary blood disorder. This could be brought on by acute blood loss, polymyalgia rheumatica, marrow failure (pure red-cell aplasia, aplastic anemia, infiltration), endocrine failure (hypothyroidism, hypopituitarism), anemia of chronic disease, or renal failure.

== Diagnosis ==
A CBC with differential, mean corpuscular volume, and mean corpuscular hemoglobin concentration are all common tests used to diagnose normocytic normochromic anemia.

== Treatment ==
The treatment of normocytic normochromic anemia is primarily focused on addressing the underlying cause of anemia. Blood transfusion continues to be an important short-term management option, particularly for people with severe anemia, who are symptomatic, or who have associated cardiac disease.
