= Majeed syndrome =

- This condition is inherited in an autosomal recessive manner.
- Specialty: Medical genetics
- Frequency: 0.0001%

Majeed syndrome is an inherited skin disorder characterized by chronic recurrent multifocal osteomyelitis, congenital dyserythropoietic anemia and a neutrophilic dermatosis. It is classified as an autoinflammatory bone disorder. The condition is found in people with two defective copies (autosomal recessive inheritance) of the LPIN2 gene. LPIN2 encodes lipin-2 which is involved in lipid metabolism. The pathogenesis of this mutation with the clinical manifestations has not been elucidated.

== Treatments ==
Treatments for this disorder are often based on what symptoms are present in the patient. Most commonly prescribed treatments include nonsteroidal anti-inflammatory drugs (NSAIDs), as well as physical therapy in order to prevent muscle atrophy in patients. Red blood transfusions could also be done for patients with severe congenital dyserythropoietic anemia (CDA).

== Genetics ==
LPIN2

Identifiers
- Aliases: LPIN2, lipin 2
- External IDs: OMIM: 605519; MGI: 1891341; GeneCards: LPIN2
Enzyme activity
EC #	BRENDA	ExPASy	KEGG	MetaCyc
3.1.3.4	↗	↗	↗	↗

Gene location (Human)
Chr.	Chromosome 18 (human)
Band	18p11.31	Start	2,916,994 bp
Band	18p11.31	End	3,013,144 bp

Gene location (Mouse)
Chr.	Chromosome 17 (mouse)
Band	17|17 E1.3	Start	71,489,555 bp
Band	17|17 E1.3	End	71,556,812 bp
RNA expression pattern
Bgee	Human / Mouse (ortholog); Top expressed in: jejunal mucosa; liver; right lobe of liver; duodenum; secondary oocyte; testicle; pars compacta; gonad; blood; tibia / Top expressed in: renal corpuscle; primary oocyte; right lung lobe; left lobe of liver; secondary oocyte; medullary collecting duct; zygote; Rostral migratory stream; retinal pigment epithelium; Paneth cell; More reference expression data
BioGPS	n/a
Gene ontology
Molecular function	hydrolase activity; phosphatidate phosphatase activity; transcription coactivator activity
Cellular component	cytoplasm; cytosol; endoplasmic reticulum membrane; membrane; endoplasmic reticulum; nucleus
Biological process	fatty acid catabolic process; regulation of transcription, DNA-templated; lipid metabolism; phosphatidylethanolamine biosynthetic process; transcription, DNA-templated; fatty acid metabolic process; triglyceride biosynthetic process; phosphatidylcholine biosynthetic process; dephosphorylation; positive regulation of transcription by RNA polymerase II; cellular response to insulin stimulus
Sources:Amigo / QuickGO
Orthologs
Databases	NCBI: entry; OMA: entry
Species	Human	Mouse
Entrez	9663	64898
Ensembl	ENSG00000101577	ENSMUSG00000024052
UniProt	Q92539	Q99PI5
RefSeq (mRNA)	NM_014646; NM_001375808; NM_001375809	NM_001164885; NM_022882; NM_001357791
RefSeq (protein)	NP_055461; NP_001362737; NP_001362738	NP_001158357; NP_075020; NP_001344720
Location (UCSC)	Chr 18: 2.92 – 3.01 Mb	Chr 17: 71.49 – 71.56 Mb
PubMed search
- Wikidata
View/Edit Human	View/Edit Mouse

Majeed syndrome is caused by pathogenic mutations in the gene LPIN2, though related CRMO disorders have been associated with the genes IL1RN and IL1R1. LPIN2 encodes a phosphatidate phosphatase enzyme called Lipin-2, which mouse studies suggest converts phosphatidic acid to diglyceride as part of certain types of lipid synthesis.

== See also ==
- TNF receptor associated periodic syndrome
- List of cutaneous conditions
