= FLVCR1 =

Protein-coding gene in humans

Identifiers
- Aliases: FLVCR1, AXPC1, FLVCR, MFSD7B, PCA, PCARP, feline leukemia virus subgroup C cellular receptor 1, SLC49A1, FLVCR heme transporter 1
- External IDs: OMIM: 609144; MGI: 2444881; GeneCards: FLVCR1

Gene location (Human)
Chr.	Chromosome 1 (human)
Band	1q32.3	Start	212,858,275 bp
Band	1q32.3	End	212,899,363 bp

Gene location (Mouse)
Chr.	Chromosome 1 (mouse)
Band	1|1 H6	Start	190,738,044 bp
Band	1|1 H6	End	190,758,355 bp
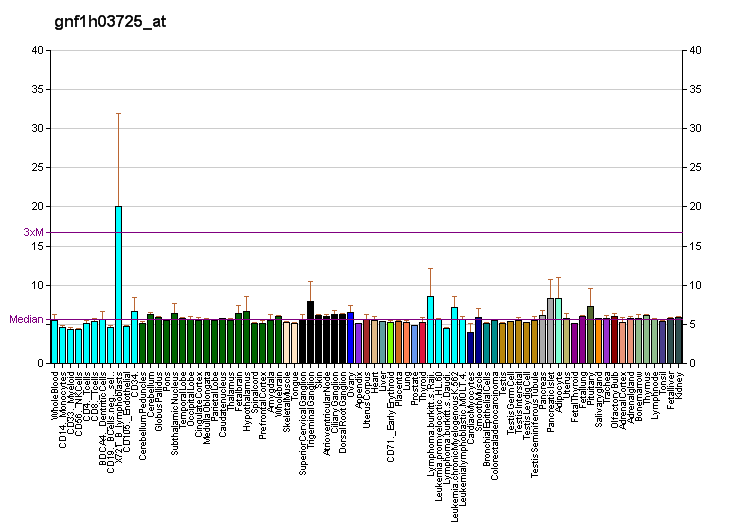

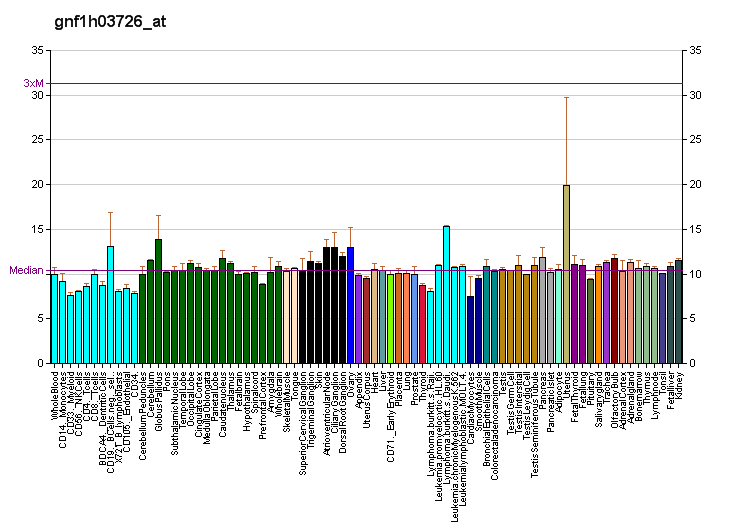
RNA expression pattern
Bgee	Human / Mouse (ortholog); Top expressed in: jejunal mucosa; mucosa of ileum; pancreatic epithelial cell; corpus epididymis; bronchial epithelial cell; buccal mucosa cell; duodenum; germinal epithelium; pylorus; retinal pigment epithelium / Top expressed in: epithelium of small intestine; ciliary body; temporal muscle; migratory enteric neural crest cell; granulocyte; triceps brachii muscle; intercostal muscle; ileum; digastric muscle; stroma of bone marrow; More reference expression data
BioGPS	More reference expression data
Gene ontology
Molecular function	transporter activity; protein binding; heme transmembrane transporter activity; heme binding
Cellular component	integral component of membrane; mitochondrial membranes; membrane; plasma membrane; integral component of plasma membrane; mitochondrion
Biological process	embryonic skeletal system morphogenesis; head morphogenesis; limb morphogenesis; multicellular organism growth; embryonic digit morphogenesis; in utero embryonic development; mitochondrial transport; spleen development; heme transport; multicellular organism development; blood vessel development; erythrocyte differentiation; regulation of organ growth; heme export; cellular iron ion homeostasis; erythrocyte maturation; transmembrane transport
Sources:Amigo / QuickGO
Orthologs
Databases	NCBI: entry; OMA: entry
Species	Human	Mouse
Entrez	28982	226844
Ensembl	ENSG00000162769	ENSMUSG00000066595
UniProt	Q9Y5Y0	B2RXV4
RefSeq (mRNA)	NM_014053	NM_001081259; NM_001313747; NM_198025
RefSeq (protein)	NP_054772	NP_001074728; NP_001300676; NP_932142
Location (UCSC)	Chr 1: 212.86 – 212.9 Mb	Chr 1: 190.74 – 190.76 Mb
PubMed search
- Wikidata
View/Edit Human	View/Edit Mouse

Feline leukemia virus subgroup C receptor-related protein 1 is a protein that in humans is encoded by the FLVCR1 gene (SLC49A1).
