= SBDS =

Protein-coding gene in the species Homo sapiens

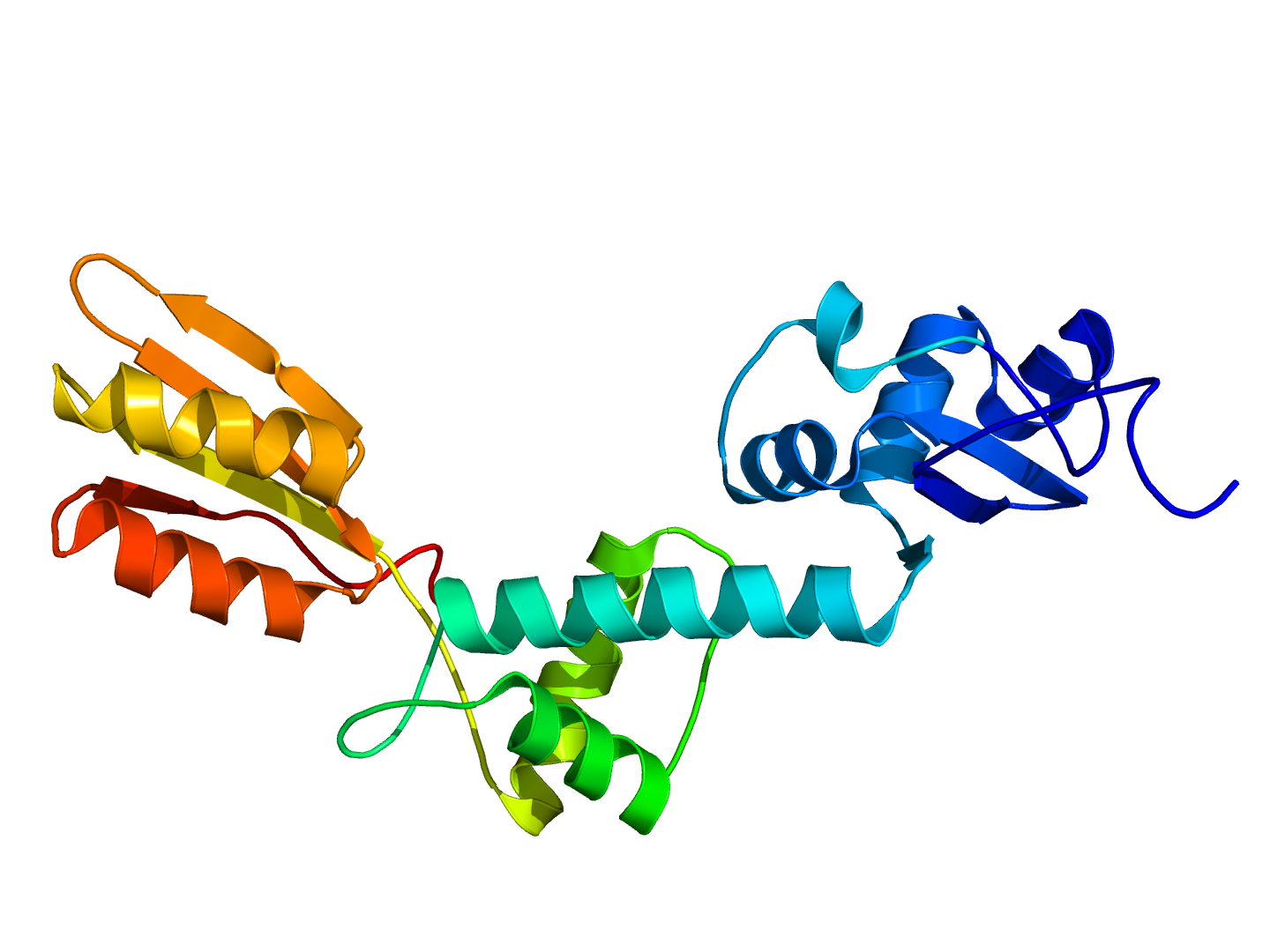

Identifiers
- Aliases: SBDS, SDS, SWDS, CGI-97, SBDS ribosome assembly guanine nucleotide exchange factor, ribosome maturation factor, SBDS ribosome maturation factor, SDO1
- External IDs: OMIM: 607444; MGI: 1913961; GeneCards: SBDS
Available structures
PDB	Ortholog search: PDBe RCSB
PDB	List of PDB id codes 2KDO, 2L9N, 5AN9, 5ANB, 5ANC

Gene location (Human)
Chr.	Chromosome 7 (human)
Band	7q11.21	Start	66,987,680 bp
Band	7q11.21	End	66,995,586 bp

Gene location (Mouse)
Chr.	Chromosome 5 (mouse)
Band	5|5 G1.3	Start	130,274,572 bp
Band	5|5 G1.3	End	130,284,371 bp
RNA expression pattern
Bgee	Human / Mouse (ortholog); Top expressed in: popliteal artery; tibial arteries; Achilles tendon; gastric mucosa; right coronary artery; C1 segment; gastrocnemius muscle; thoracic aorta; ascending aorta; left coronary artery / Top expressed in: genital tubercle; zygote; tail of embryo; Ileal epithelium; secondary oocyte; neural layer of retina; duodenum; colon; right kidney; sciatic nerve; More reference expression data
BioGPS	n/a
Gene ontology
Molecular function	microtubule binding; ribosome binding; rRNA binding; protein binding; RNA binding
Cellular component	spindle; spindle pole; cytoskeleton; nucleoplasm; cytoplasm; nucleolus; nucleus; cytosol
Biological process	rRNA processing; bone mineralization; mature ribosome assembly; cell population proliferation; ribosome biogenesis; leukocyte chemotaxis; bone marrow development; inner cell mass cell proliferation; mitotic spindle organization
Sources:Amigo / QuickGO
Orthologs
Databases	NCBI: entry; OMA: entry
Species	Human	Mouse
Entrez	51119	66711
Ensembl	ENSG00000126524	ENSMUSG00000025337
UniProt	Q9Y3A5	P70122
RefSeq (mRNA)	NM_016038	NM_023248
RefSeq (protein)	NP_057122	NP_075737
Location (UCSC)	Chr 7: 66.99 – 67 Mb	Chr 5: 130.27 – 130.28 Mb
PubMed search
- Wikidata
View/Edit Human	View/Edit Mouse

Ribosome maturation protein SBDS is a protein that in humans is encoded by the SBDS gene. An alternative transcript has been described, but its biological nature has not been determined. This gene has a closely linked pseudogene that is distally located. This gene encodes a member of a highly conserved protein family that exists in all archaea and eukaryotes.

== Function ==
The encoded protein plays an essential role in ribosome biogenesis. SBDS interacts with elongation factor-like GTPase 1 (Efl1) to disassociate eukaryotic initiation factor 6 (eIF6) from the late cytoplasmic pre-60S ribosomal subunit allowing assembly of the 80S. Dynamic rotation of the SBDS protein in the ribosomal P site is coupled to a conformational switch in EFL1 that promotes eIF6 displacement through competition for an overlapping binding site on the 60S ribosomal subunit. Yeast SBDS ortholog, Sdo1, functions within a pathway containing Efl1 to facilitate the release and recycling of the nucleolar shuttling factor Tif6 (yeast eIF6 ortholog) from late cytoplasmic pre-60S ribosomal subunit. Knockdown of SBDS expression results in increased apoptosis in erythroid cells undergoing differentiation due to elevated ROS levels. Hence SBDS is critical for normal erythropoiesis.

This family is highly conserved in species ranging from archaea to vertebrates and plants. The family contains several Shwachman-Bodian-Diamond syndrome (SBDS) proteins from both mouse and humans. Shwachman-Diamond syndrome is an autosomal recessive disorder with clinical features that include pancreatic exocrine insufficiency, haematological dysfunction and skeletal abnormalities. Members of this family play a role in RNA metabolism.

A number of uncharacterised hydrophilic proteins of about 30 kDa share regions of similarity. These include,

- Mouse protein 22A3.
- Saccharomyces cerevisiae chromosome XII hypothetical protein YLR022c.
- Caenorhabditis elegans hypothetical protein W06E11.4.
- Methanococcus jannaschii hypothetical protein MJ0592.

This particular protein sequence is highly conserved in species ranging from archaea to vertebrates and plants.

== Structure ==
The SBDS protein contains three domains, an N-terminal conserved FYSH domain, central helical domain and C-terminal domain containing an RNA-binding motif.

=== N-terminal domain ===
SBDS protein N-terminal domain

Identifiers
- Symbol: SBDS
- Pfam: PF01172
- InterPro: IPR019783
- PROSITE: PDOC00974
- SCOP2: 1nyn / SCOPe / SUPFAM
Available protein structures:
- PDB: IPR019783 PF01172 (ECOD; PDBsum)
- AlphaFold: IPR019783; PF01172

This protein domain appears to be very important, since mutations in this domain are usually the cause of Shwachman-Bodian-Diamond syndrome. It shares distant structural and sequence homology to a protein named YHR087W found in the yeast Saccharomyces cerevisiae. The protein YHR087W is involved in RNA metabolism, so it is probable that the SBDS N-terminal domain has the same function.

The N-terminal domains contains a novel mixed alphabeta fold, four beta-strands, and four alpha-helices arranged as a three beta stranded anti-parallel-sheet.

=== Central domain ===
The function of this protein domain has been difficult to elucidate. It is possible that it has a role in binding to DNA or RNA. Protein binding to form a protein complex is also another possibility. It has been difficult to infer the function from the structure since this particular domain structure is found in archea.

This domain contains a very common structure, the winged helix-turn-helix.

=== C-terminal domain ===
SBDS protein C-terminal domain

Identifiers
- Symbol: SBDS_C
- Pfam: PF09377
- InterPro: IPR018978
- SCOP2: 1nyn / SCOPe / SUPFAM
Available protein structures:
- PDB: IPR018978 PF09377 (ECOD; PDBsum)
- AlphaFold: IPR018978; PF09377

In molecular biology, the SBDS C-terminal protein domain is highly conserved in species ranging from archaea to vertebrates and plants.

Members of this family are thought to play a role in RNA metabolism. However, its precise function remains to be elucidated. Furthermore, its structure makes it very difficult to predict the protein domain's function.

The structure of the C-terminal domain contains a ferredoxin-like fold This structure has a four-stranded beta-sheet with two helices on one side.

== Clinical significance ==
Mutations within this gene are associated with Shwachman-Bodian-Diamond syndrome. The two most common mutations associated with this syndrome are at positions 183–184 (TA→CT) resulting in a premature stop-codon (K62X) and a frameshift mutation at position 258 (2T→C) resulting in a stopcodon (C84fsX3).
