= Congenital dyserythropoietic anemia =

Red blood cell disorder causing anemia

- Other names: Familial erythroid multinuclearity, Hereditary Erythroblastic Multinuclearity with a Positive Acidified Serum lysis test (HEMPAS)
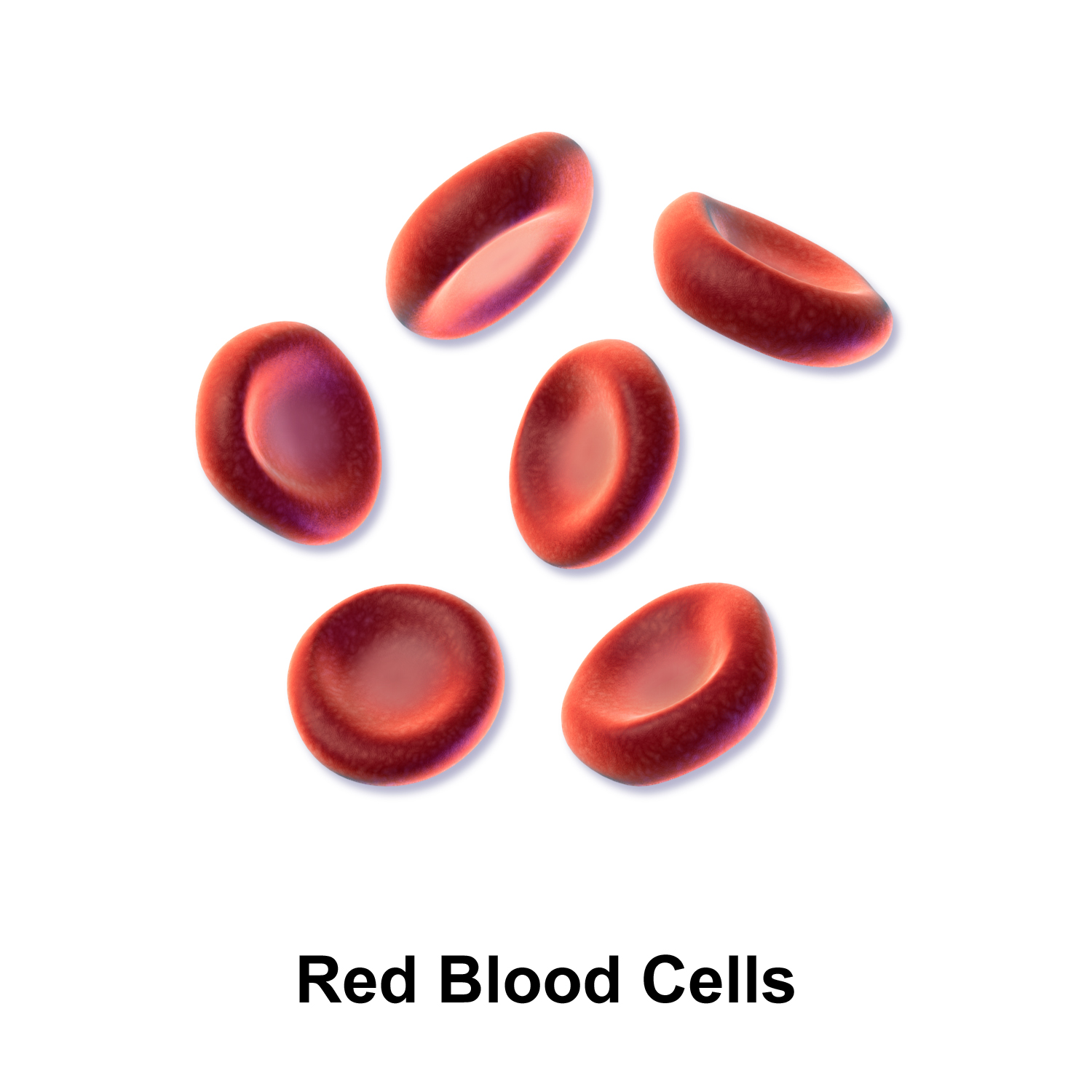
- Specialty: Hematology
- Symptoms: Anemia, weakness, tiredness, enlarged spleen, iron overload
- Usual onset: From birth
- Types: Types 1,2,3 and 4
- Causes: Genetic
- Diagnostic method: Genetic testing
- Treatment: Blood transfusion, stem cell transplant

Congenital dyserythropoietic anemia (CDA) is an umbrella term used to denote a group of rare blood disorders which share some characteristics. All have genetic origin, usually inherited from parents; and they are characterised by a partial failure of the bone marrow to produce healthy red blood cells. This in turn leads to anemia which in some cases can be severe.

Symptoms of CDA depend on the type and its severity; they can include tiredness, weakness, and jaundice. In some cases the liver or spleen may become enlarged. CDA may also cause the body to absorb too much iron, leading to damage of other organs. Four types of CDA are generally recognised, designated as CDA-1, CDA-2, CDA-3 and CDA-4. Other variants have been described; each type has a distinct genetic cause and identifiable changes in the bone marrow. Exact diagnosis of the disease requires microscopic examination of a bone marrow sample, followed by genetic sequencing.

Mild cases may need no treatment. Severe cases must be managed by regular blood transfusions; stem cell transplantation from a well matched donor is also possible.As of 2024, fewer than a thousand cases of CDA have been described worldwide; prevalence in Europe is fewer than 1 case per million.

The term congenital dyserythropoietic anemia was coined in 1968 when three types (CDA-1, CDA-2 and CDA-3) were included in the group.

== Types ==
=== CDA-1 ===
CDA anemia type 1 presents as moderate to severe macrocytic anemia with symptoms like fatigue, weakness, and pale skin, often presenting in childhood. It is also associated with enlarged spleen and liver. The bone marrow shows abnormal chromatin under the microscope. It is caused by a mutation in the CDAN1 or CDIN1 gene, and has autosomal recessive inheritance.

=== CDA-2 ===
Features of congenital dyserythropoietic anemia type 2 (CDA II) include enlarged spleen (splenomegaly), jaundice, gallstones, and often iron overload. Under the microscope, the bone marrow shows a high number of erythroblasts with two nuclei. The cause is a mutation in the SEC23B gene, and has autosomal recessive inheritance. It is the most common form of CDA, and is also known as HEMPAS (hereditary erythroblastic multinuclearity with a positive acidified serum test).

=== CDA-3 ===
This is extremely rare; as of 2025 it has only been found in three families. It is characterized by mild to moderate anemia and the presence of giant erythroblasts in the bone marrow, with multiple nuclei. It can be caused by a mutation in the KIF23 gene (in which case inheritance is autosomal dominant) or the RACGAP1 gene (in which case inheritance is autosomal recessive). The proteins from these genes are essential for the cytokinesis phase of cell division. The first cases of CDA-3 were described in 1951 and initially called "familial erythroid multinuclearity"

=== CDA-4 ===
This is a moderate to severe anemia which is evident at birth and can potentially be detected during pregnancy. In severe cases, the unborn child may have hydrops fetalis (swelling caused by fluid accumulation before birth). It is extremely rare; only 10 cases have been diagnosed worldwide. In each case, the cause is a mutation of the KLF1 gene, which is necessary for the proper maturation of red blood cells. Unlike types 1-3, this is a de novo mutation which was not inherited. Some authorities regard CDA-4 as one of a subgroup of transcription-factor related CD anemias.

=== Other types ===
These include Majeed syndrome and some instances of sideroblastic anemia.

== Signs and symptoms ==
The typical symptoms of anaemia are common to all types of CDA - depending on severity, these can include fatigue, weakness, jaundice, and an enlarged liver and spleen (hepatosplenomegaly). CDA may also cause the body to absorb too much iron, leading to damage to tissues and organs.

Other symptoms are specific to the type of CDA involved.

== Diagnosis ==
Diagnosing CDA involves a bone marrow examination, and genetic testing to confirm the diagnosis and type. Microscopic examination of a bone marrow smear is crucial for identifying specific changes such as erythroblasts with multiple nuclei. Genetic testing is used for final confirmation.

== Treatment ==
Treatment of individuals with CDA usually consist of frequent blood transfusions, but this can vary depending on the type and severity of anemia that the individual has.

== See also ==
- List of hematologic conditions
- Thalassemia
