= Automated analyser =

Medical laboratory instrument

An automated analyser is a medical laboratory instrument designed to measure various substances and other characteristics in a number of biological samples quickly, with minimal human assistance. These measured properties of blood and other fluids may be useful in the diagnosis of disease.

Roche Cobas 6000

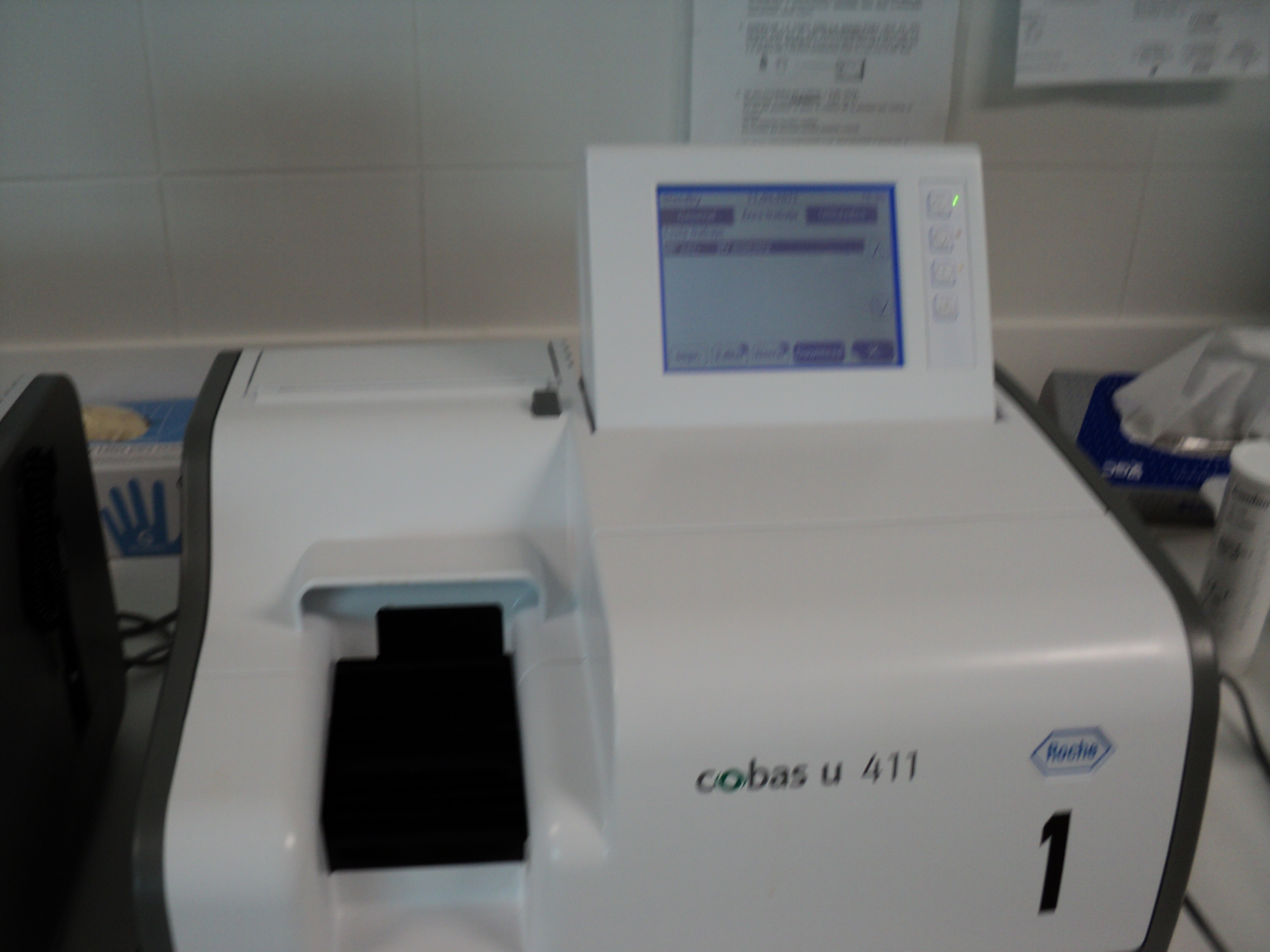
Roche Cobas u 411

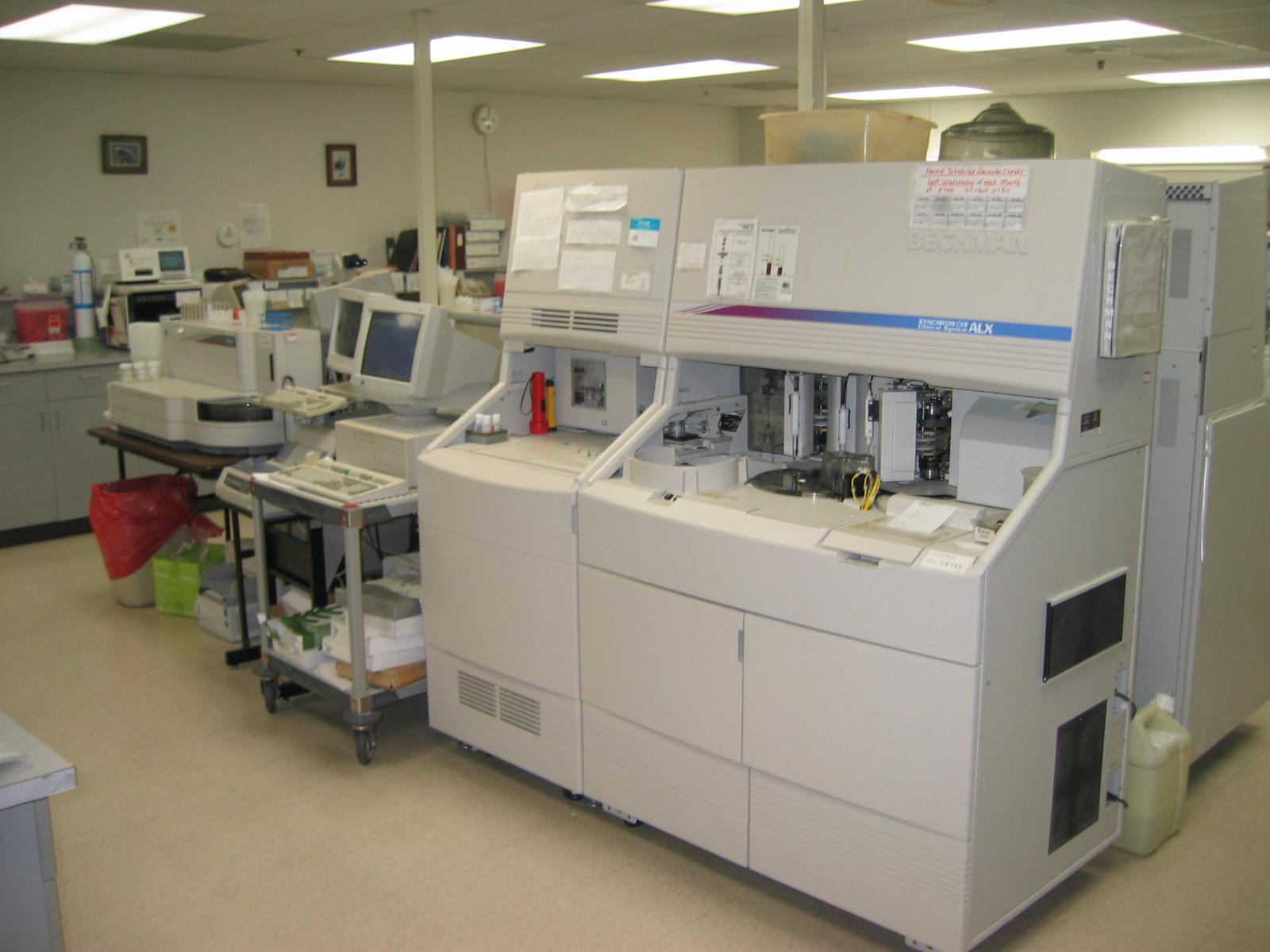
Beckman Chemistry analysers: Access (left); Synchron (right).

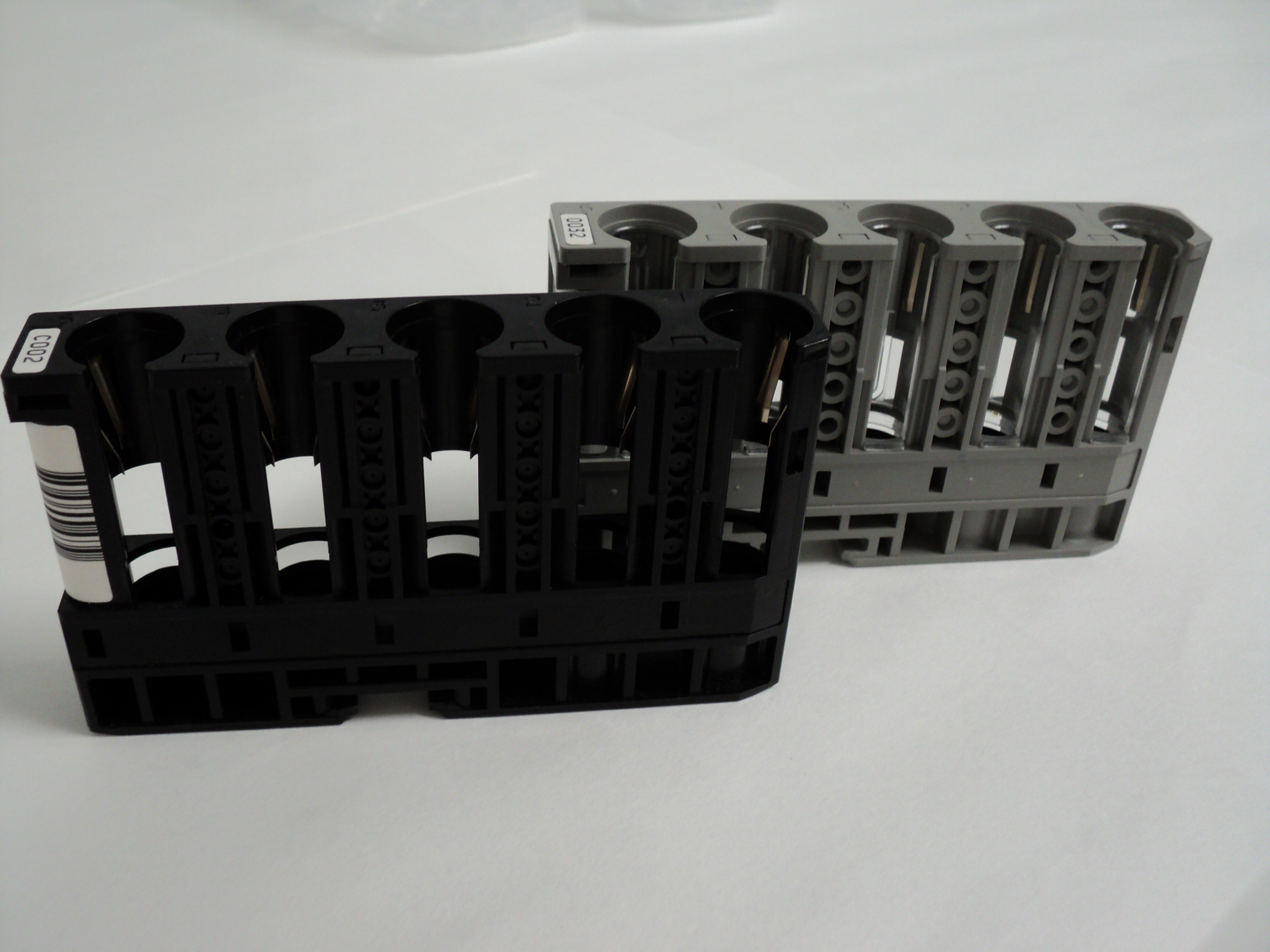
Racks: for putting samples, quality controls or calibrations. Cobas 6000

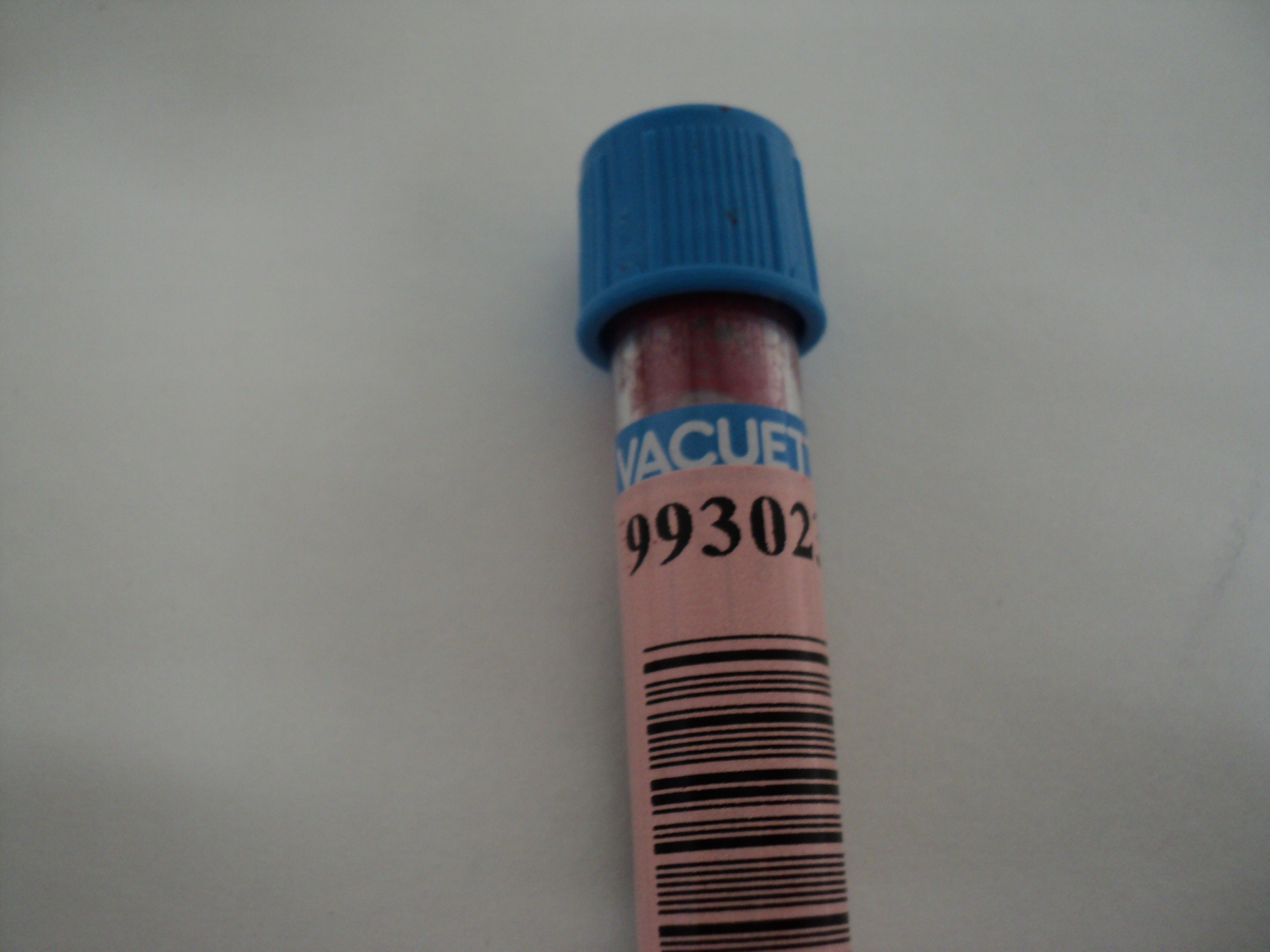
These tubes are put in the racks for testing

Photometry is the most common method for testing the amount of a specific analyte in a sample. In this technique, the sample undergoes a reaction to produce a colour change. Then, a photometer measures the absorbance of the sample to indirectly measure the concentration of analyte present in the sample. The use of an ion-selective electrode (ISE) is another common analytical method that specifically measures ion concentrations. This typically measures the concentrations of sodium, calcium or potassium present in the sample.

There are various methods of introducing samples into the analyser. Test tubes of samples are often loaded into racks. These racks can be inserted directly into some analysers or, in larger labs, moved along an automated track. More manual methods include inserting tubes directly into circular carousels that rotate to make the sample available. Some analysers require samples to be transferred to sample cups. However, the need to protect the health and safety of laboratory staff has prompted many manufacturers to develop analysers that feature closed tube sampling, preventing workers from direct exposure to samples. Samples can be processed singly, in batches, or continuously.

The automation of laboratory testing does not remove the need for human expertise (results must still be evaluated by medical technologists and other qualified clinical laboratory professionals), but it does ease concerns about error reduction, staffing concerns, and safety.

== Routine biochemistry analysers ==
These are machines that process a large portion of the samples going into a hospital or private medical laboratory. Automation of the testing process has reduced testing time for many analytes from days to minutes. The history of discrete sample analysis for the clinical laboratory began with the introduction of the "Robot Chemist" invented by Hans Baruch and introduced commercially in 1959.

The AutoAnalyzer is an early example of an automated chemistry analyser using a special flow technique named "continuous flow analysis (CFA)", invented in 1957 by Leonard Skeggs, PhD and first made by the Technicon Corporation. The first applications were for clinical (medical) analysis. The AutoAnalyzer profoundly changed the character of the chemical testing laboratory by allowing significant increases in the numbers of samples that could be processed. Samples used in the analyser include, but are not limited to, blood, serum, plasma, urine, cerebrospinal fluid, and other fluids from within the body. The design based on separating a continuously flowing stream with air bubbles largely reduced slow, clumsy, and error-prone manual methods of analysis. The types of tests include enzyme levels (such as many of the liver function tests), ion levels (e.g. sodium and potassium, and other tell-tale chemicals (such as glucose, serum albumin, or creatinine).

Simple ions are often measured with ion selective electrodes, which let one type of ion through, and measure voltage differences. Enzymes may be measured by the rate they change one coloured substance to another; in these tests, the results for enzymes are given as an activity, not as a concentration of the enzyme. Other tests use colorimetric changes to determine the concentration of the chemical in question. Turbidity may also be measured.

== Immuno-based analysers ==
Antibodies are used by some analysers to detect many substances by immunoassay and other reactions that employ the use of antibody-antigen reactions.

When concentration of these compounds is too low to cause a measurable increase in turbidity when bound to antibody, more specialised methods must be used.

Recent developments include automation for the immunohaematology lab, also known as transfusion medicine.

== Haematology analysers ==
These are used to perform complete blood counts, erythrocyte sedimentation rates (ESRs), or coagulation tests.

=== Cell counters ===
Automated cell counters sample the blood, and quantify, classify, and describe cell populations using both electrical and optical techniques. Electrical analysis involves passing a dilute solution of the blood through an aperture across which an electrical current is flowing. The passage of cells through the current changes the impedance between the terminals (the Coulter principle). A lytic reagent is added to the blood solution to selectively lyse the red cells (RBCs), leaving only white cells (WBCs), and platelets intact. Then the solution is passed through a second detector. This allows the counts of RBCs, WBCs, and platelets to be obtained. The platelet count is easily separated from the WBC count by the smaller impedance spikes they produce in the detector due to their lower cell volumes.

Optical detection may be utilised to gain a differential count of the populations of white cell types. A dilute suspension of cells is passed through a flow cell, which passes cells one at a time through a capillary tube past a laser beam. The reflectance, transmission and scattering of light from each cell is analysed by sophisticated software giving a numerical representation of the likely overall distribution of cell populations.

Some of the latest haematology instruments may report Cell Population Data that consist in Leukocyte morphological information that may be used for flagging Cell abnormalities that trigger the suspect of some diseases.

Reticulocyte counts can now be performed by many analysers, giving an alternative to time-consuming manual counts. Many automated reticulocyte counts, like their manual counterparts, employ the use of a supravital dye such as new methylene blue to stain the red cells containing reticulin prior to counting. Some analysers have a modular slide maker which is able to both produce a blood film of consistent quality and stain the film, which is then reviewed by a medical laboratory professional.

=== Coagulometers ===
Automated coagulation machines or Coagulometers measure the ability of blood to clot by performing any of several types of tests including Partial thromboplastin times, Prothrombin times (and the calculated INRs commonly used for therapeutic evaluation), Lupus anticoagulant screens, D dimer assays, and factor assays.

Coagulometers require blood samples that have been drawn in tubes containing sodium citrate as an anticoagulant. These are used because the mechanism behind the anticoagulant effect of sodium citrate is reversible. Depending on the test, different substances can be added to the blood plasma to trigger a clotting reaction. The progress of clotting may be monitored optically by measuring the absorbance of a particular wavelength of light by the sample and how it changes over time.

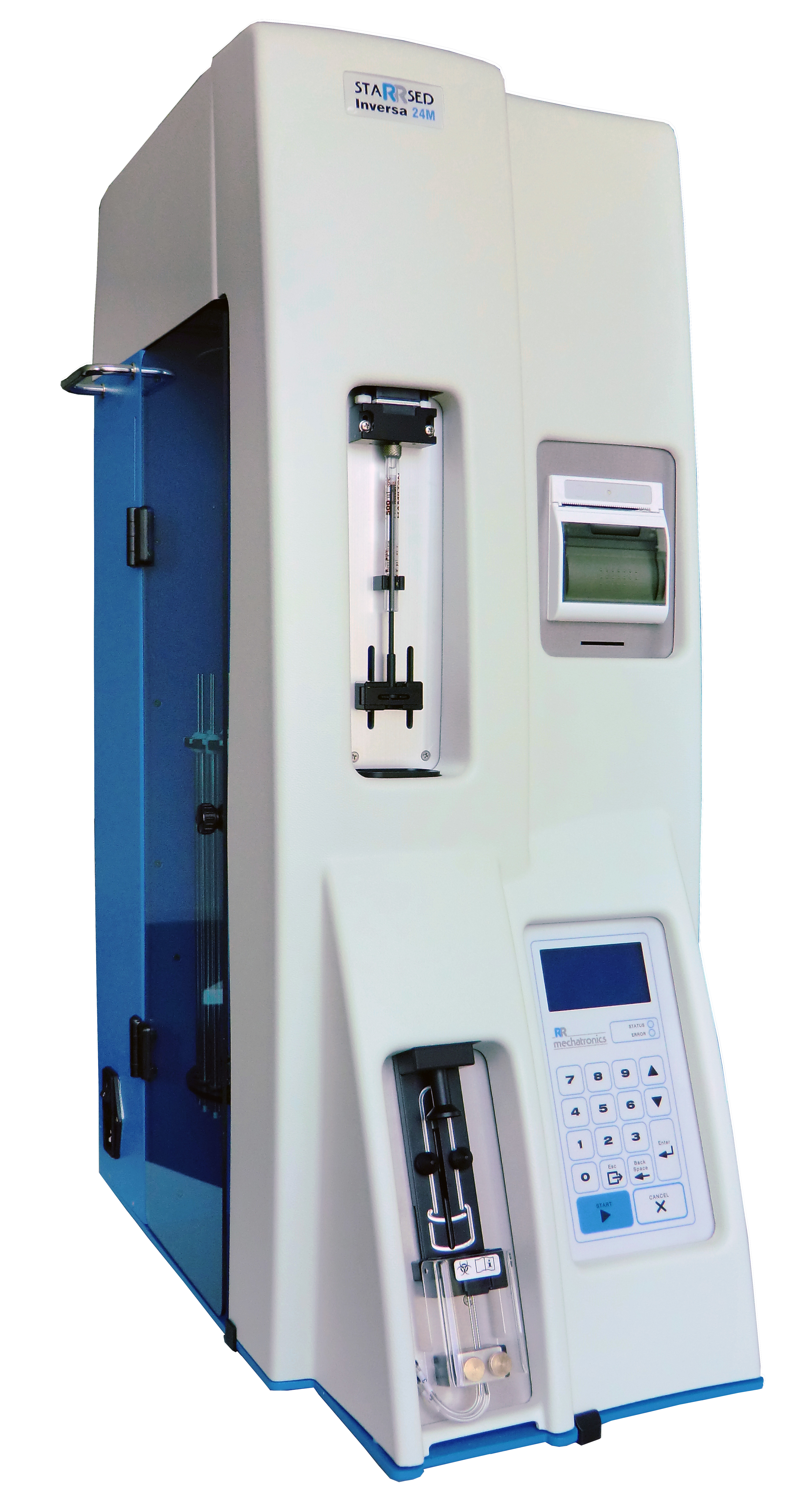
StaRRsed Inversa, automated Westergren-based ESR 'analyzer'

=== Other haematology apparatus ===
Automatic erythrocyte sedimentation rate (ESR) readers, while not strictly analysers, do preferably have to comply to the 2011-published CLSI (Clinical and Laboratory Standards Institute) "Procedures for the Erythrocyte Sedimentation Rate Test: H02-A5 and to the ICSH (International Council for Standardization in Haematology) published "ICSH review of the measurement of the erythrocyte sedimentation rate", both indicating the only reference method, being Westergren, explicitly indicating the use of diluted blood (with sodium citrate), in 200 mm pipettes, bore 2.55 mm. After 30 or 60 minutes being in a vertical position, with no draughts and vibration or direct sunlight allowed, an optical reader determines how far the red cells have fallen by detecting the level.

== Miscellaneous analysers ==
Some tests and test categories are unique in their mechanism or scope, and require a separate analyser for only a few tests, or even for only one test. Other tests are esoteric in nature—they are performed less frequently than other tests, and are generally more expensive and time-consuming to perform. Even so, the current shortage of qualified clinical laboratory professionals has spurred manufacturers to develop automated systems for even these rarely performed tests.

Analysers that fall into this category include instruments that perform:

- DNA labelling and detection
- Osmolarity and osmolality measurement
- Measurement of glycated haemoglobin (haemoglobin A1C), and
- Aliquotting and routing of samples throughout the laboratory

== See also ==
- Comprehensive metabolic panel
- Medical technologist
