= Reticulocytopenia =

- Other names: Aplastic crisis, Marrow failure
- Specialty: Hematology
- Causes: Parvovirus B19 (Aplastic Crisis) Pure Red Cell Aplasia Aplastic Anemia

Reticulocytopenia is the medical term for an abnormal decrease in circulating red blood cell precursors (reticulocytes) that can lead to anemia due to resulting low red blood cell (erythrocyte) production. Reticulocytopenia may be an isolated finding or it may not be associated with abnormalities in other hematopoietic cell lineages such as those that produce white blood cells (leukocytes) or platelets (thrombocytes), a decrease in all three of these lineages is referred to as pancytopenia.

With isolated reticulocytopenia, the main cause is parvovirus B19 infection of reticulocytes leading to transient anemia. In patients who rely on frequent red cell regeneration e.g. sickle cell disease, a reticulocytopenia can lead to a severe anemia due to the cessation in red cell production (erythropoiesis), referred to as aplastic crisis. If pancytopenia is present, bone marrow failure must be considered and evaluation for bone marrow failure syndromes or aplastic anemia must be pursued. Treatment is dependent on the etiology and may include replacement of blood products as patients can develop severe anemia.

== Differential diagnosis ==
Reticulocytopenia may be associated with abnormalities in other hematopoietic cell lineages. The following is a differential diagnosis for patients in which reticulocytopenia is the most marked cytopenia. For conditions that lead to significant reduction in all three cell lineages, see pancytopenia or aplastic anemia.

- Parvovirus B19 infection
- Transient Erythroblastopenia of Childhood
- Pure red cell aplasia
- Hereditary bone marrow failure syndromes
  - Diamond-Blackfan anemia (congenital pure red cell aplasia)
  - Pearson marrow-pancreas syndrome
  - Congenital dyserythropoietic anemia
- Malnutrition – (e.g. deficiencies in B12, folate, iron)
- Sequelae of malignancy, connective tissue disease, autoimmune disease
- Adverse effect of medication

== Pathophysiology ==
The specific pathophysiology differs with each etiology. For conditions that lead to pancytopenia, see aplastic anemia.

=== Parvovirus B-19 infection ===
Parvovirus is able to infiltrate the bone marrow and enter and replicate in red blood cell precursors such as reticulocytes. Viral replication in reticulocytes causes apoptosis (cell death) of affected cells. The reduction in living reticulocytes leads to a decrease in red blood cell production. This transient cessation in red cell production results in a decrease in hemoglobin that is often asymptomatic in people without underlying hematologic disorders. Reticulocyte production often recovers within one week. Parvovirus infection in people reliant on frequent red cell production due to low baseline production or high turnover rates are at risk of developing a life-threatening condition called aplastic crisis (see below).

=== Bone marrow failure syndromes ===
Bone marrow failure syndromes may be acquired or inherited. These conditions lead to a decrease in one or more cell lineages. Diamond-Blackfan Anemia is an example of a congenital bone marrow failure syndrome that primarily affects red blood cell production. In DBA, the erythroid cell lineage is more susceptible to cell death due to abnormal ribosome function. This leads to a reduced population of red blood cell precursors and a resulting reticulocytopenia and anemia.

== Evaluation ==
For the patient with isolated reticulocytopenia and anemia without significant disturbances in other cell lineages, the initial evaluation may include some of the following studies:

- Complete blood count with differential
- Peripheral blood smear
- Type and Cross (in case transfusion is needed)
- Reticulocyte Production Index

=== Further evaluation ===
Depending on findings on initial evaluation, may consider investigating the cause of low reticulocyte count with some of the following studies depending on patient presentation and differential diagnoses:

- Bone marrow aspiration and evaluation
- Parvovirus B19 IgG/IgM
- Erythropoietin level
- Rheumatalogic studies
- Viral studies in addition to Parvovirus B19
- B12, Folate levels, iron studies
- Specialized tests if there is concern for hereditary bone marrow failure syndrome

== Management ==
The goal is to treat the underlying condition if it can be identified and provide supportive care. If symptomatic anemia develops, blood products may be replaced. Disease specific management may include glucocorticoids, IVIG, immunosuppressive agents, stem cell transplant, or other treatments depending on the etiology of reticulocytopenia.

== Complications ==
=== Anemia ===
Severe anemia can lead to complications such as heart failure due to volume overload, bone marrow necrosis, etc. See anemia for further details.

=== Aplastic crisis ===
Transient decrease in erythropoiesis resulting in low reticulocyte count with decrease in hemoglobin >/= 3 g/dL is considered to be aplastic crisis. For the decrease in all cell lineages (pancytopenia), see aplastic anemia. The majority of cases of aplastic crisis are seen in people with hematologic disorders and superimposed infection with Parvovirus B19.

==== Predisposing conditions ====
Patients who rely on frequent regeneration of RBCs due to shorter RBC lifespan or decreased production are at risk of developing aplastic crisis when erythropoiesis is affected as they cannot compensate for the lapse in red cell production. A typical erythrocyte has a lifespan of about 120 days while an erythrocyte in a sickle cell patient has an average lifespan of 12–15 days. Listed below are some of the conditions that may put a patient at risk of developing aplastic crisis if there is a disruption in erythropoiesis.

- Hemolytic disorders – hereditary spherocytosis
- Hemoglobinopathies – sickle cell disease, thalassemias
- Red cell enzymopathies - G6PD Deficiency, PK Deficiency
- Autoimmune hemolytic anemias
- Chronic anemias, blood loss- low baseline production e.g. iron deficiency anemia

==== Parvovirus B19 infection and transient aplastic crisis ====
The majority of transient aplastic crises (TACs) are triggered by parvovirus B19 in patients with hematologic disorders. These patients often present with high viral titers during profound anemia and are found to have reticulocytopenia upon further evaluation. Children are more affected than adults, and immunity appears to last several years after infection. Patients with TAC due to parvovirus B19 are less likely to have the typical slapped-cheek rash (erythema infectiosum) characteristic of this infection. Infections with Salmonella, Streptococcus pneumoniae, and other pathogens may also lead to TAC. With parvovirus infection, bone marrow recovery typically occurs within 10 days and erythropoiesis resumes. Parvovirus IgG/IgM may be obtained to assess for active infection. Patients may require IVIG or replacement of blood products during this transient bone marrow failure to reduce the chance of serious complications from the severe anemia.

== See also ==
- Erythropoiesis – process of creating red blood cells
- Hemolytic anemia – reduced number of red blood cells due to destruction of the cells after they were made
- Nutritional anemia – reduced number of red blood cells due to vitamin deficiency or other dietary factors
- Spherocytosis- the shape of red blood cell becomes spherical than bi-concave.
