= Pearson syndrome =

- Other names: Sideroblastic anemia with marrow cell vacuolization and exocrine pancreatic dysfunction, Pearson's marrow/pancreas syndrome

Pearson syndrome is a mitochondrial disease characterized by sideroblastic anemia and exocrine pancreas dysfunction. Other clinical features are failure to thrive, pancreatic fibrosis with insulin-dependent diabetes and exocrine pancreatic deficiency, muscle and neurologic impairment, and, frequently, early death. It is usually fatal in infancy. The few patients who survive into adulthood often develop symptoms of Kearns–Sayre syndrome. It is caused by a deletion in mitochondrial DNA. Pearson syndrome is very rare: fewer than a hundred cases have been reported in medical literature worldwide.

The syndrome was first described by pediatric hematologist and oncologist Howard Pearson in 1979; the deletions causing it were discovered a decade later.

== Presentation ==
Pearson syndrome is a very rare mitochondrial disorder characterized by health conditions such as sideroblastic anemia, liver disease and exocrine pancreas deficiency.

== Genetics ==
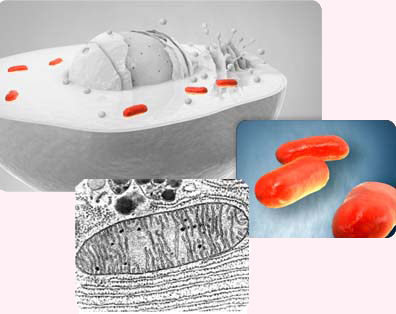
Mitochondria

Pearson syndrome is a mitochondrial disease caused by a deletion in mitochondrial DNA (mtDNA). An mtDNA is genetic material contained in the cellular organelle called the mitochondria. Depending on the tissue type, each cell contains hundreds to thousands of mitochondria. There are 2–10 mtDNA molecules in each mitochondrion. With mitochondrial disorders caused by defects in the mtDNA, the severity of the disease depends on the number of mutant mtDNA molecules present in the cells.

Pearson syndrome consists of mtDNA deletions that differ in size and location compared to other mtDNA disorders such as chronic progressive ophthalmoplegia (CPEO) and Kearns-Sayre syndrome (KSS). The deletions in these molecules are usually spontaneous and normally include one or more tRNA genes. Even though prenatal testing for Pearson syndrome is theoretically possible, analyzing and interpreting the results would be extremely difficult.

With the use of molecular genetic testing, the deletions of mitochondrial DNA with Pearson syndrome range in size from 1.1 to 10 kilobases. A common mtDNA deletion associated with Pearson syndrome is the deletion of 4977 bp. This deletion has been labeled as m.8470_13446del4977. Diagnosing Pearson syndrome utilizes leukocyte DNA with the Southern Blot analysis. This type of mitochondrial DNA deletion is normally more abundant and easily isolated in the blood than in any other tissue type.

=== Mitochondrial disease ===
Pearson syndrome is classified as a mitochondrial disease because it consists of several overlapping syndromes that are caused by mutations of mitochondrial DNA. Specifically, Pearson syndrome is a combination of syndromes that involves the bone marrow and the exocrine pancreas.

=== Pearson marrow–pancreas syndrome ===
Pearson marrow–pancreas syndrome (PMPS) is a condition that presents with severe reticulocytopenic anemia. With the pancreas not functioning properly, high levels of fat may develop in the liver (hepatic steatosis). PMPS can also lead to diabetes and scarring of the pancreas.

== Pathophysiology ==
=== Defining features ===
1. Blood. In Pearson syndrome the bone marrow fails to produce white blood cells called neutrophils. The syndrome also leads to anemia, low platelet count and aplastic anemia. It may be confused with transient erythroblastopenia of childhood.
2. Pancreas. Pearson syndrome causes the exocrine pancreas to fail to function properly because of scarring and atrophy.

Individuals with this condition have difficulty absorbing nutrients from their diet. Infants with this condition generally do not grow nor gain weight.

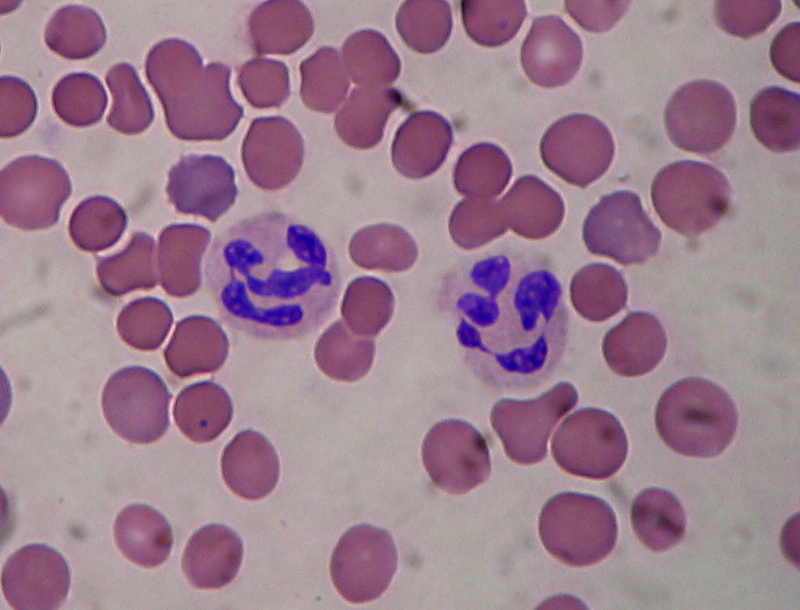
Neutrophils

== Diagnosis ==
To diagnose Pearson syndrome a physician can either collect a bone marrow biopsy and look for sideroblastic anemia, a symptom of Pearson Syndrome, or measure the fat content in a feces sample. Genetic testing is also an option in which identifying mutations in mitochondrial DNA, specifically deletions or duplications, would confirm the diagnosis of Pearson syndrome.

== Treatment ==
Currently there are no approved therapies for Pearson syndrome and patients rely on supportive care. Minovia Therapeutics is the first company to conduct a designated clinical trial for treating patients affected by this disease. In December 2022 researchers at Minova reported modest results in five patients affected by either Pearson syndrome or Kearns–Sayre syndrome.

== History ==
Pearson syndrome was initially characterized in 1979 as a fatal disorder that affects infants. It has now been identified as a rare condition that affects multiple systems. The symptoms of Pearson syndrome are mitochondrial cytopathy with anemia, neutropenia, and thrombocytopenia.
