= Fifth disease =

Red rash due to infection with parvovirus B19

Erythema infectiosum
- Other names: Fifth disease, slapped cheek syndrome, slapcheek, slap face, slapped face
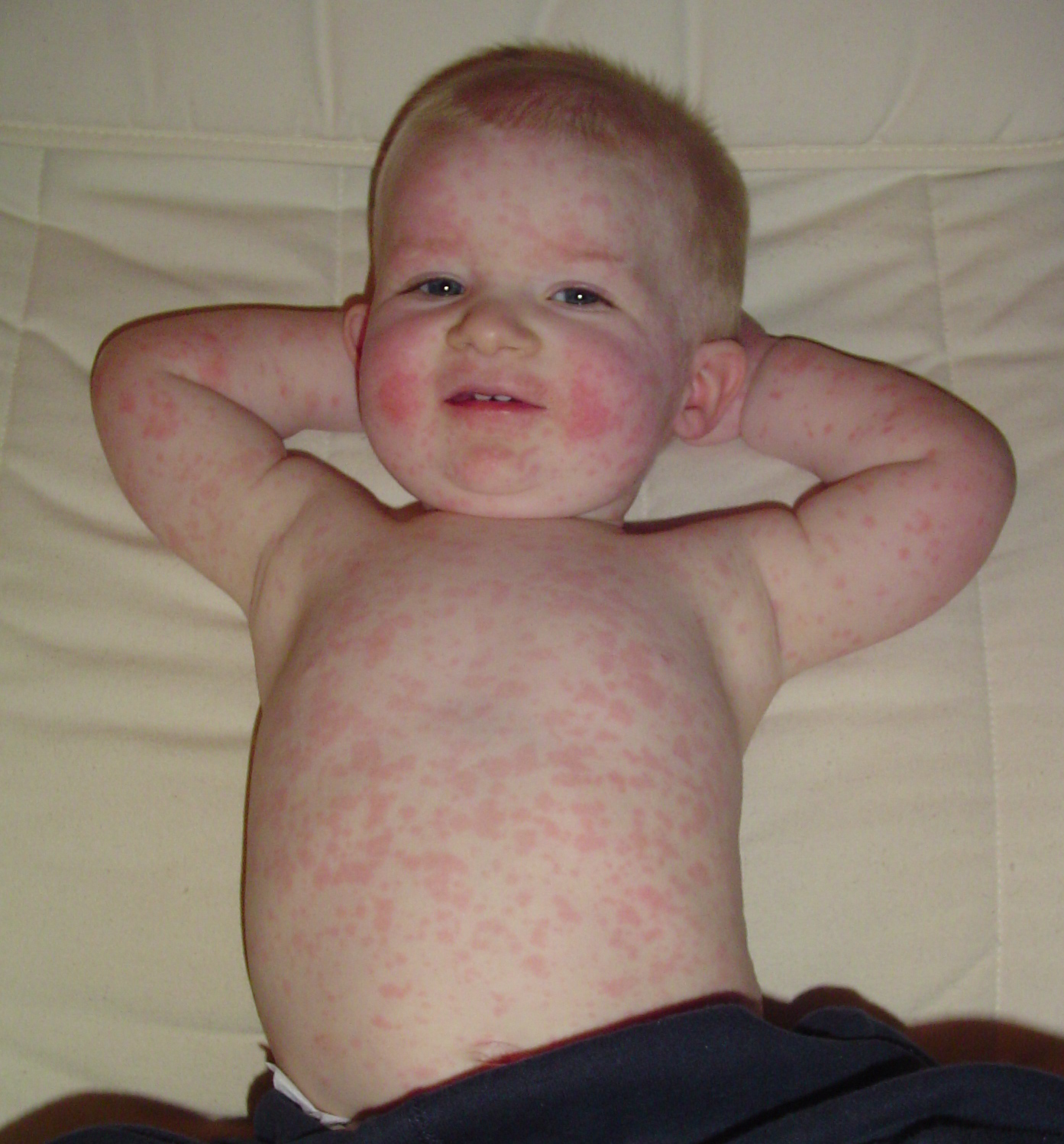
- 16-month-old with erythema infectiosum, displaying characteristic red rashes
- Specialty: Infectious disease
- Symptoms: Red rash, especially on cheeks and harsh coughs
- Causes: Human parvovirus

Fifth disease, also known as erythema infectiosum and slapped cheek syndrome, is a common and contagious disease caused by infection with parvovirus B19. This virus was discovered in 1975 and can also cause other diseases besides fifth disease. Fifth disease typically presents as a rash and is most common in children. Parvovirus B19 can affect people of all ages; about two out of ten persons infected will have no symptoms.

== Pathogenicity ==
Parvovirus B19 is a virus within the Parvoviridae family that causes disease in humans, especially in children. The most common disease derived from parvovirus B19 is fifth disease. This disease is spread in close contact through respiratory droplets, which can be from the nose, mouth, or direct contact with an infected person. Fifth disease is most commonly spread in the winter and spring seasons among children aged six to fourteen years old. Parvovirus B19 begins replicating anywhere from four to eighteen days after infection. Infected children are most contagious during this period, before they develop the most notable sign—a red rash on their cheeks—along with other symptoms.

Since parvovirus B19 is a single stranded DNA virus, replication can only occur in dividing cells. This is also why populations other than children can become infected with parvovirus B19, develop fifth disease, and experience complications. Certain populations are at higher risk if they have more dividing cells or a weakened immune system than the typical person. These populations include pregnant women, fetuses, adults, and immunocompromised individuals. Over the last few years, first-time infections in pregnant women have been increasing throughout the world. About 1-5% of pregnant women can become infected. Typically, having the virus will not impact the outcome of the pregnancy, and 90% of cases of infected fetuses do not lead to any serious outcomes. However, complications can still occur in both the fetus and mother. For example, if fetuses contract parvovirus B19, possible complications can include miscarriage or intrauterine fetal death. Additionally, infected adults have been documented to develop arthralgias, or joint pain. Also, a specific group of immunocompromised people with bone marrow failure and infected with parvovirus B19 have been shown to develop aplastic crisis. Other notable complications caused by infection from parvovirus B19 can include gloves and sock syndrome.

== Signs and symptoms ==
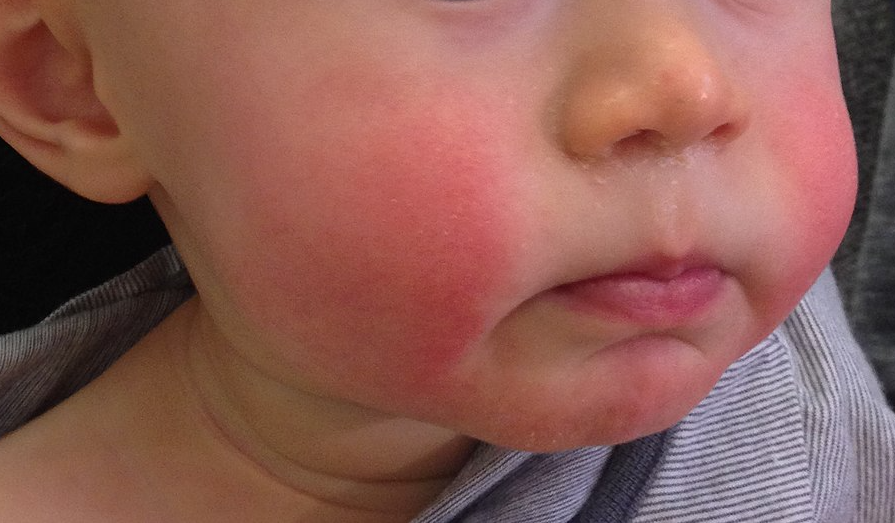
Appearance of the distinctive "slapped-cheek" rash seen in fifth disease

The symptoms of fifth disease are usually mild and may start as a fever, headache or a runny nose. These symptoms pass, then a few days later, the rash appears. The bright red rash most commonly appears in the face, particularly the cheeks. Children infected typically go through 3 stages; first when the rash appears on the face. This is a defining symptom of the infection in children (hence the name "slapped cheek disease"). In addition to red cheeks, the second stage consists of children developing a red, lacy rash on the rest of the body, with the upper arms, torso, and legs being the most common locations. The rash typically lasts a few days and may itch; some cases have been known to last for several weeks. People are usually no longer infectious once the rash has appeared. Lastly the third stage consists of recurring rashes due to hot showers, sun exposure, or minor injuries lasting about 11 days.

In children, the risk of Parvovirus B19-related arthralgia (joint-stiffness) is less than 10%, but 19% of those with new-onset arthritis may have developed the B19 infection within the previous 10 weeks. Teenagers and adults may present with joint pain or swelling, out of which 60% infected females and 30% of infected males reported these symptoms. Out of these, 20% of the females may experience continuous joint stiffness for several months or years. Symptoms can persist up to 3 weeks since onset. Sometimes, fifth disease can also cause serious complications, especially if the person is pregnant, has anemia, or is immunocompromised; affecting the blood system, joints or nerves. Adults with fifth disease may have difficulty in walking and in bending joints such as wrists, knees, ankles, fingers, and shoulders.

The disease is usually mild, but in certain risk groups and rare circumstances, it can have serious consequences:

- In pregnancy, infection in the first trimester is considered more detrimental for the mother but contraction of the infection in the second trimester has been linked to hydrops fetalis, a condition causing excessive build up of fluid in the fetus' tissues and organs causing edema, and thus causing spontaneous miscarriage.
- Those who are immunocompromised (HIV/AIDS, chemotherapy) may be at risk for complications if exposed.
- In less than 5% of women with parvovirus B19 infection, a baby may develop severe anemia leading to miscarriage. This occurs most often during the first half of pregnancy.

== Causes ==
Fifth disease, also known as erythema infectiosum, is caused by parvovirus B19, which only infects humans. Infection by parvovirus B19 can lead to multiple clinical manifestations, but the most common is fifth disease.

Parvovirus B19 (B19V) is a small, single-stranded, non-enveloped DNA virus. Binding of B19V capsid to the cellular receptor globoside (Gb4Cer) results in a cascade of structural changes and subsequent signal transduction processes facilitating the entry of parvovirus B19 into the host cell. After gaining access to the host cell, B19V binds to glycosphingolipid globoside (blood group P antigen) targeting erythroid lineage in the bone marrow. Replication of viral genome and release of virus from infected cells lead to various complex effects on host's cellular environment such as induction of DNA damage, hijack of cell cycle and apoptosis (killing of infected cells).

B19V DNA has been found in a wide range of tissues in healthy and diseased individuals indicates the persistence of B19V infection. According to a clinical microbiology review published by Jianming Qiu "Persistence of viral DNA has been detected in up to 50% of biopsy specimens of the spleen, lymph nodes, tonsils, liver, heart, synovial tissues, skin, brain, and testes, for decades after infection."

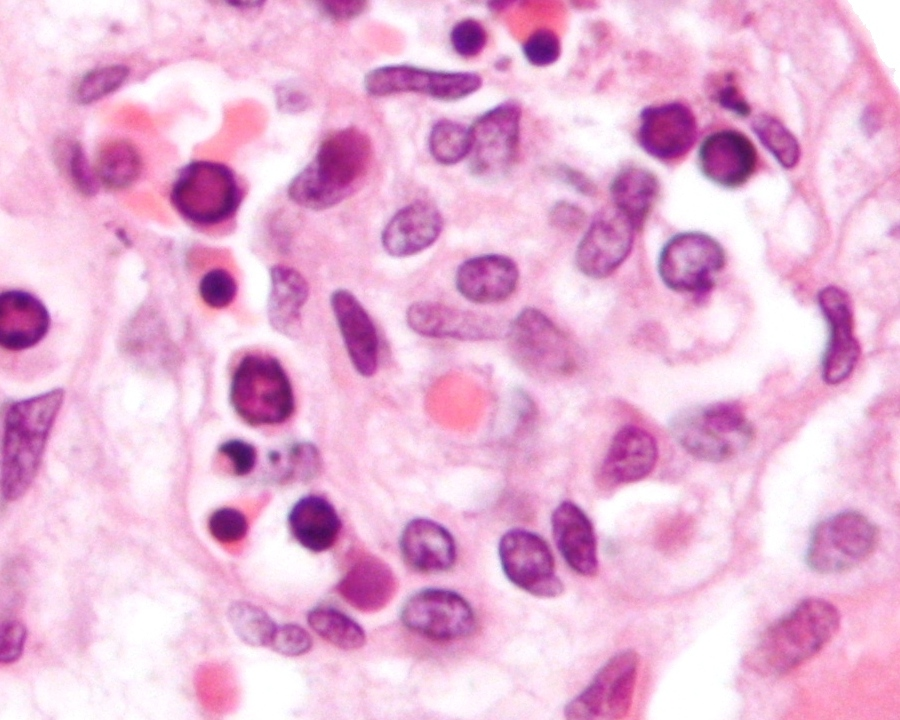
Parvovirus B19 (B19V)

Recovery from parvovirus B19 infection is achieved by production of IgM antibodies which are specific for virus and are generated 10–12 days after infection. After day 16, when signs of fifth disease (red rashes) and arthralgia (pain in joints) becomes apparent, specific anti B19 IgG is produced by immune cells. Production of serum anti B19 IgG keeps infection under control and facilitates the recovery of erythroid cell production in erythroid lineage cells that were targeted by parvovirus B19.

== Transmission ==
Fifth disease is transmitted primarily by respiratory droplets such as sneezing, coughing, etc.; by direct contact through the saliva or mucus, but can also be spread by contact with infected blood either directly or through blood transfusions. The incubation period (the time between exposure to an infection and the onset of symptoms) is usually between 4 and 21 days. Viremia (a condition which occurs when viruses enter the bloodstream and eventually spread to the rest of the body) occurs within 5 to 10 days from exposure to Parvovirus B19, and the person remains contagious 5 days following Viremia. Typically, school children, day-care workers, teachers, and parents are most likely to be exposed to the virus making them high risk population. Rates of transmission of Parvovirus B19 is highest in household settings with people living with infected persons, leading to almost 50%, moderate among adults with a 40% transmission rate, and variable in people working at daycare centers and schools with about 10-60% of transmission risk. The most common time for infection to spread in children causing fifth disease is during late winters and early spring, with outbreaks occurring every 3–4 years. Vertical transmission from maternal infection may also occur, which can lead to hydrops fetalis, a human disease of the fetuses due to the infection's detrimental effects on red blood cell production.

Parvovirus B19 can also be transmitted through blood products such as frozen plasma or cellular blood components (Red blood cells, white blood cells and platelets, as the virus is resistant to the common mechanism of solvent detergent techniques that is used to inactivate pathogens in these blood products.

== Diagnosis ==
The most common manifestation of fifth disease is marked by a red, "slapped cheek" look on the face and a lace-like rash on the body and limbs. The "slapped cheek" appearance of the rash can be suggestive of fifth disease, however, the rash can be mistaken with other skin related disease or infections. Many other viral rashes, like measles, rubella, roseola, and scarlet fever, can look similar to erythema infectiosum. In adults, for example, joint pain caused by parvovirus B19 infection might make doctor consider conditions like the flu and mononucleosis during initial diagnosis. Doctors may also consider ruling out non-infectious causes like drug allergies and certain types of arthritis; which can present with similar symptoms as fifth disease. For this reason, blood samples testing can be definitive in confirming the diagnosis of fifth disease. These blood tests are commonly referred to as "diagnostic assays". An antibody assay uses antibodies designed to detect parvovirus antigen or protein in blood circulation. For example, anti-parvovirus B19 IgM antibody serum assay is often the preferred method to detect previous infection. The assay can result positive one week after initial infection. Negative assay results may prompt retesting in the future to rule out early sampling of blood serum. A positive assay result can also be indicative of an infection within the previous two to six months. People acquire lifetime immunity if IgG antibodies are produced in response to parvovirus B19 exposure. Infection by parvovirus B19 can also be confirmed by isolation of viral DNA detected by Polymerase Chain Reaction (PCR) or direct hybridization. PCR tests are considered significantly more sensitive to detecting the viral antigen parvovirus B19 compared direct DNA hybridization. In order to diagnose fifth disease in a fetus, a PCR test is done using a sample taken from the amniotic fluid surrounding the baby (otherwise known as "amniocentesis"). A DNA hybridization assay can better detect variants of the parvovirus B19. There exists 3 biological similar genotypes of parvovirus B19, numbered one through three. The most common genotype circulating is genotype one. Laboratory tests can indicate complications of infection, including anemia, liver damage, and low platelet count.

Aside from diagnosing fifth disease with laboratory tests, it is crucial to monitor fetal blood flow in the brain. This involves looking for signs of moderate to severe anemia using an ultrasound.

== Treatment ==
Treatment for fifth disease is primarily symptomatic and supportive as the infection is frequently self-limiting. A self-limiting infection typically does not require treatment, such as medication, and will heal independently. While there is currently no specific therapy recommendation for fifth disease, symptom management can be attempted with over-the-counter medications. Antipyretics, such as acetaminophen, are commonly used to reduce fevers. In cases of joint disease, such as those with arthritis or arthralgia, treatment options can include medications that reduce inflammation, like non-steroidal anti-inflammatories (NSAID); or other anti-inflammatories can be used. It is essential to never give children aspirin for any of their symptoms due to the risk of Reye's syndrome. Conservative treatment targeted to relieve people with symptoms of joint disease caused by fifth disease has also utilized acupuncture, physical therapy exercises, and chiropractic care along with pharmacologic management. Other forms of treatment include plenty of rest, increased daily fluids, nutritious daily meal intake, medication adherence and overall wellbeing.

The rash usually does not itch but can be mildly painful. The rash itself is not considered contagious. The infection generally lasts about 5 to 10 days. Stress, hot temperatures, exercise, and exposure to sunlight can contribute to recurrence within months of the initial infection. Upon resolution, immunity is considered life-long. Populations at greater risk of complications (see below) may need referral to a specialist. Anemia is a more severe complication that could result from parvovirus B19 infection and requires a blood transfusion as part of therapy.

== Prevention ==
Since there is no specific treatment for fifth disease, prevention is an important factor. Although fifth disease primarily occurs in children and will typically resolve on its own, similar to the cold, vulnerable populations such as those who are immunocompromised, pregnant, or people with anemia are more at risk of developing complications from the disease due to their bodies compromised state making it harder for the body to fight off the virus. Therefore, prevention of fifth disease is an important factor in decreasing the number of people who become sick from the B19 virus resulting in fifth disease.

Primary prevention aims to prevent the virus from infecting the host's body and ultimately stop the disease from happening. In contrast, secondary prevention aims to detect the disease early on in its course and stop its progression. An example of a primary prevention strategy is the use of vaccines. There currently are no approved vaccinations for fifth disease. More research needs to be done to develop of a safe, productive, and efficacious vaccine. However, clinical studies have shown that vaccinations for B19 carry possible additional benefits to high-risk people, such as those who are pregnant, immunocompromised, have had organ transplants, and children with anemia.

The abbreviation NPI stands for non-pharmaceutical interventions. As discussed in the 'Transmission' content above, fifth disease can be spread from human to human through blood respiratory particles, and from mother to baby during pregnancy. Since somebody can spread fifth disease through respiratory particles, similar to the transmission of COVID-19, the CDC recommends following the general recommendations for respiratory viruses. Thus, much of the same NPI utilized during the COVID-19 pandemic can be used as preventive strategies for fifth disease, such as practice good hand hygiene, coughing and sneezing into the elbow, proper mask etiquette, and isolating when sick/contagious.

=== High risk/vulnerable population prevention ===
One of the populations that is at high risk for severe complications from contracting fifth disease, as discussed in the complications section, is pregnant women and their fetuses. The primary prevention for pregnant women is to reduce the exposure or contact with fifth disease. Prevention strategies for pregnant women, due to the increased risk of severe complications both for them and the fetus, include increased awareness about the virus/disease to provide them with the knowledge and resources they need to take care of their health effectively, those who are at high-risk for complications should also be advised on the transmission of the virus and educated on what other safety measures they could practice to avoid areas where transmission of the disease is typically high such as childcare centers, close contact with school-age children or even close contact with someone who works with school-aged children such as teachers, and healthcare settings such as hospitals.

== Outcomes ==
In fifth disease, parvovirus B19 has the potential to affect various parts of the body, including the skin, heart, brain, joints, liver and more. Thus, complications of fifth disease can be present in various populations with different conditions such as pregnancy, fetal development, neurological conditions, autoimmune disorders, etc. While parvovirus B19 is typically transmitted via respiratory secretions or hand to mouth contact, it has also been known to be passed from pregnant women to fetuses. Notably, there are some known complications associated with fifth disease relating to pregnant women and fetuses that can range from mild to moderate, and in some cases, severe complications can affect both pregnant women and fetuses. Roughly 50-75% of all pregnant women are immune to parvovirus B19 while the remainder of women are susceptible to mild illness. In a 2024 review of parvovirus b19 infection and pregnancy, it is found that pregnant women who do not have immunity to parvovirus B19 are at higher risk of passing the infection to their baby, especially if they contract it during the first trimester or second trimester; which can lead to more serious complications. Although the potential consequences of erythema infectiosum can be quite serious in pregnancy, pregnant women can be tested for immunity via the presence of IgG antibodies and IgM antibodies. A majority of fetuses who do contract parvovirus B19 show either no significant symptoms or complete resolution of the virus. However, the following serious complications are rare but possible: miscarriage, stillbirth, fetal anemia, hepatic failure, and abnormal neurodevelopment outcome. In some cases, fetuses would develop hydrops fetalis due to congenital parvovirus B19. This condition was studied as a determinant of later fetal outcomes, such as miscarriage or perinatal death, in 2016 systematic review. The review showed that those born with parvovirus B19 that caused hydrops fetalis did have an association with higher mortality risk and higher risk of complications.

In addition to fetuses, parvovirus B19 infection and its effects has been studied in adults as well. The parvovirus B19 infection has also been associated with the fetal development of neurological complications, as identified in a systematic review in 2014. This analysis included a total of 89 studies covering complications in both the central and nervous system such as encephalitis, meningitis, and peripheral neuropathy. However, the specific pathophysiology of these complications has yet to be discovered but the review does encourage the use of antibody testing to determine a patient's risk. Infection of this virus is not limited to the nervous system. Parvovirus B19 has also been linked to cases of cardiac inflammation that can cause structural damage to the heart over time. If the damage progresses and is significant, cardiac cell death may occur.

In people with weakened immune systems, parvovirus B19 infection often causes low blood cell counts and can lead to chronic infection. Sometimes, an acute parvovirus B19 infection can mimic or even trigger autoimmune disease because it can cause the body to produce antibodies against itself. Individuals that are living with HIV are also susceptible to complications if infected due to being immunocompromised. This happens due to processes like molecular mimicry, cell death, and enzyme activation. While relatively rare, those who live with both HIV and parvovirus B19 infection will be unable to fight off the B19 virus. This can result in substantial loss of red blood cells and cause anemia.

Recent research has found that children and adults who are infected with Parvovirus B19 may develop acute arthritis, and in some cases, chronic joint problems. Studies have detected the presence of the Virus' DNA in the synovial tissue of people with rheumatoid arthritis, but other studies show mixed results.

In some cases, parvovirus B19 can mainly affect the bone marrow due to the virus's strong attraction to bone marrow receptors, often causing bone marrow function to decrease. This is why viral infection by parvovirus B19 can be particularly harmful to people with hemolytic anemia or blood cancers, leading to a condition called pure red cell aplasia.

== Epidemiology ==
Fifth disease is also known as human parvovirus B19V found all throughout the world, primarily during childhood. This virus spreads by breathing in the viral particles or in the womb during fetal development. The illness is very common and self-limiting. The modes of transmission include respiratory droplets, blood, or mother to fetus. Fifth disease is most prevalent in children aged 5 to 15 years old. Fifth disease occurs at lower rates in adults. The virus spreads easily and once contracted, the body will begin developing lasting immunity to reinfection. The prevalence of antibodies is 50% in children and 70% to 85% in adults. The virus affects both men and women equally. During the spring and winter, epidemic outbreaks are most likely to occur. In the summer and fall, sporadic cases and outbreaks occur. The outbreaks most commonly occur in daycares and schools. The periodicity of the outbreak cycle is three-to-seven years. The risk of acquiring the viral illness increases when exposed to an infected person or contaminated blood. Individuals who have an occupation that requires close contact with infected people such as healthcare workers and teachers are at an increased risk of acquiring the viral illness. Another risk factor of fifth disease are immunocompromised individuals, those with anemia are at a higher risk of developing complications. Pregnant women are at risk for acquiring viral illness, especially during the first half of pregnancy. Though, complications are very rare and less than 5% of these cases will experience serious complications. The most common complication among pregnant women is anemia. In rare cases, severe anemia can occur, and a buildup of fluid can develop. A buildup of fluid can cause congestive heart failure or death. A blood infusion or induction may be necessary. No vaccine is available for human parvovirus B19, though attempts have been made to develop one.

=== Vulnerable populations ===
Parvovirus B19 can cause serious complications in certain groups of people:

1. Pregnant women - B19 infection in this population can lead to detrimental effects on the fetus, causing hydrops fetalis, as mentioned previously. The risk of fetal infection and harm to the fetus is not high, but if the child is infected, the outcome is not adverse. According to a study, pregnant women infected with Parvovirus B19 carry a 30% chance of infecting the fetus with only 9% of them experiencing adverse outcomes.
2. Immunocompromised people are also at risk of being infected and having poor outcomes from the virus. These people with a weakened immune system either due to HIV, transplants or congenital immunodeficiencies, may be seen experiencing chronic anemia as their bodies are unable to fight the virus effectively. This can cause prolonged anemia in the affected individuals.
3. In people with sickle-cell disease or other forms of chronic hemolytic anemia, a blood disorder, the infection can precipitate an aplastic crisis, wherein the bone marrow of the individual will suddenly stop producing red blood cells.

A 2019 systematic review examined the rates of parvovirus B19 infection among daycare workers. Since transmission typically occurs through respiratory secretions, it was thought that daycare workers would be at an increased risk of infection because young children can spread saliva through drool. The systematic review indicates that daycare workers are at an increased risk for infection. Another review also supports the finding that daycare workers have an increased risk of contracting parvovirus B19 infection. A 2019 meta-analysis examined rates of parvovirus B19 infection among those with sickle cell disease (SCD) using IgG and IgM antibody detection. Pooled data from Africa, Asia, and the Americas revealed a 48.8% parvovirus B19 infection prevalence among persons with sickle cell disease. Prevalence of infection was also determined by geographic location, where areas with reduced access to adequate housing had higher prevalence (Africa was 55.5%). A 2020 literature review also supports the finding that persons with SCD, as well as those with the blood disorder beta thalassemia, are at a higher risk of parvovirus B19 infection.

== History ==
=== Parvovirus B19 ===
Fifth disease is caused by a virus known as Parvovirus B19. This virus was officially discovered in 1975 by Yvonne Cossart and research group. They accidentally discovered the virus while analyzing hepatitis B virus surface antigen panels. The name, B19, comes from its label among a panel in row B and number 19. The group used electron microscopy and found viral particles with similar size and shape to parvoviruses that infect only animals. Soon after, a Japanese research group also found a parvovirus B19 and named it "Nakatani virus." This virus turned out to be the same one discovered by Cossart's team. Throughout this process, the virus was labeled "serum parvovirus-like particle." This changed in 1985, after confirmation of the similarity between the two research groups' findings, to B19. Parvovirus B19 is a single-stranded DNA virus and part of the Parvoviridae family, which includes Parvoviridae family Parvovirinae and Densovirinae. The Parvoviridae family is named after the Latin word "parvum," which means small. This is because before technological advancements, these viruses were considered to be one of the smallest viruses to infect mammals. However, these viruses are known to also infect invertebrates as well. So, additional genera were created depending on how the viruses replicate. These include Parvovirus, Dependovirus, and Erythrovirus. Parvovirus B19 used to be part of the Parvovirus genus since it does not need assistance to replicate, like the viruses of the Dependovirus do. However, parvovirus B19 only infects erythroid cells, so it is now part of the Erythrovirus genus. One well-known Parvovirus includes Canine parvovirus, which is known to infect dogs and cause inflammation of the small intestine and heart muscle. While all of these viruses are known to cause diseases, only parvovirus B19 infects humans. Specifically, parvovirus B19 attacks the P-antigen on human stem cells that eventually develop into red blood cells.

=== Name ===
Fifth disease's name comes from its numerical position after the top four childhood rash-causing diseases. The first four include measles, scarlet fever, rubella, and Dukes' disease. Fifth disease can also be known as "slapped cheek disease" due to the red rash that spreads on the cheeks after several days of infection with parvovirus B19.

== See also ==
- List of cutaneous conditions
- Roseola
