= Reticulocyte production index =

Calculated value in diagnosis of anemia

- Synonyms: CRC
- Purpose: is a calculated value used in the diagnosis of anemia

The reticulocyte production index (RPI), also called a corrected reticulocyte count (CRC), is a calculated value used in the diagnosis of anemia. This calculation is necessary because the raw reticulocyte count is misleading in anemic patients. The problem arises because the reticulocyte count is not really a count but rather a percentage: it reports the number of reticulocytes as a percentage of the number of red blood cells. In anemia, the patient's red blood cells are depleted, creating an erroneously elevated reticulocyte count.

== Physiology ==
Reticulocyte

Erythrocyte

Reticulocytes are newly produced red blood cells. They are slightly larger than totally mature red blood cells, and have some residual ribosomal RNA. The presence of RNA allows a visible blue stain to bind or, in the case of fluorescent dye, result in a different brightness. This allows them to be detected and counted as a distinct population.

The RPI is used to assess whether the bone marrow is producing an appropriate response to an anemic state. Reticulocyte production should increase in response to any loss of red blood cells. It should increase within 2–3 days of a major acute hemorrhage, for instance, and reach its peak in 6–10 days. If reticulocyte production is not raised in response to anemia, then the anemia may be due to an acute cause with insufficient time to compensate, or there is a defect with red blood cell production in the bone marrow. Marrow defects include nutritional deficiencies (i.e. iron, folate, or B_{12}) or insufficient erythropoietin, the stimulus for red blood cell production. Reticulocytopenia, or "aplastic crisis", is the medical term for an abnormal decrease of reticulocytes in the body The reticulocyte production index may find new use as a more reliable detector of erythropoietin-doping in athletes. The use of this method is referred to as "biological passport."

== Calculation of RPI ==
Reticulocyte Production Index is calculated as follows:

1.$Corrected Retic Percentage = Retic Percentage * {Hematocrit \over Normal Hematocrit}$

This calculation is to correct for the severity of the anemia. A value of 45% (or 0,45 L/L) is usually used as a normal hematocrit for males.

2.The next step is to correct for the longer life span of prematurely released reticulocytes in the blood—a phenomenon of increased red blood cell production. This relies on a table:

Hematocrit (%)	Retic survival (days) = maturation correction
36-45	1.0
26-35	1.5
16-25	2.0
15 and below	2.5

So, in a person whose reticulocyte percentage is 5%, hemoglobin 7.5 g/dL, hematocrit 25%, the RPI would be:

$RPI = {Corrected Retic Percentage \over Maturation Correction}$ → RPI $= {{5 * {25 \over 45}} \over 2} =$1.4

Alternatively some books provide the following formula and is called Reticulocyte Index (RI):

Whereas normal reticulocytes lose their RNA within 24 hours, a severely anemic patient with a full erythropoietin response will release reticulocytes that take from 2-3 days to lose their RNA. This has the effect of raising the reticulocyte count simply because reticulocytes produced on any single day will spend more than 1 day in circulation as reticulocytes and, therefore, will be counted for 2 or more days. The simplest method for correcting the reticulocyte count, to obtain a more accurate daily production index, is to divide the corrected count by a factor of 2 (or multiply with ½) whenever polychromasia (the presence of immature marrow reticulocytes or "shift" cells) is observed on the smear or the immature fraction on the automated counter is increased.

$RI = Retic Percentage * {Hematocrit \over Normal Hematocrit}*0.5$ → $RI = 5 * {25 \over 45}*0.5 =$1.4

== Interpretation ==
- The reticulocyte index (RI) should be between 0.5% and 2.5% for a healthy individual.
- RI < 0.5% with anemia indicates maturation disorder, meaning loss of red blood cells, but also decreased production of reticulocytes (i.e., an inadequate response to correct the anemia) and therefore red blood cells.
- RI > 2.5% with anemia indicates loss of red blood cells (from causes such as destruction, bleeding, etc.), with an increased compensatory production of reticulocytes to replace the lost red blood cells.

Interpretation of these values are not standard and vary based on specific laboratory values and clinical context.
