= New methylene blue =

Substance used as a blue dye and as a medication

Identifiers
| CAS Number | 1934–16–3 |
| 3D model (JSmol) | Interactive image |
| ChemSpider | 16736255 |
| ECHA InfoCard | 100.026.833 |
| PubChem CID | 73518 |
| UNII | 5GCZ112BCN |
- InChI: InChI=1S/C18H22N3S.ClH/c1-5-19-13-9-17-15(7-11(13)3)21-16-8-12(4)14(20–6–2)10-18(16)22-17;/h7-10,19-20H,5-6H2,1-4H3;1H/q+1;/p-1 Key: NZYCYASKVWSANA-UHFFFAOYSA-M; InChI=1/C18H22N3S.ClH/c1-5-19-13-9-17-15(7-11(13)3)21-16-8-12(4)14(20–6–2)10-18(16)22-17;/h7-10,19-20H,5-6H2,1-4H3;1H/q+1;/p-1 Key: NZYCYASKVWSANA-REWHXWOFAR
- SMILES: [Cl-].Cc1cc2nc3cc(C)c(cc3[s+]c2cc1NCC)NCC

Properties
| Chemical formula | C_{18}H_{22}N_{3}S:SCl ZnCl_{2} |
| Molar mass | 484.22 g/mol |
| Melting point | 239 °C (462 °F; 512 K) |
| Boiling point | Decomposes |

Hazards
- GHS labelling
| Pictograms | (GHS07: Exclamation mark) |
| Signal word | Warning |
| Hazard statements | H302, H312, H332 |
| Precautionary statements | P261, P264, P270, P271, P280, P301+P317, P302+P352, P304+P340, P317, P321, P330, P362+P364, P501 |
- Except where otherwise noted, data are given for materials in their standard state (at 25 °C [77 °F], 100 kPa). verify (what is ?) Infobox references

New methylene blue (NMB; sometimes Basic Blue 24) is an organic compound of the thiazine class of heterocycles. It is used as a stain and as an antimicrobial agent. It is classified as an azine dye, and the chromophore is a cation, the anion is often unspecified.

New methylene blue contains the word new in its name to differentiate the effectiveness of staining, between its predecessor methylene blue, the chemical structure of methylene blue, and the colors between the two.

== Applications ==
NMB is a staining agent used in diagnostic cytopathology and histopathology, typically for staining immature red blood cells. It is a supravital stain. It is closely related to methylene blue, an older stain in wide use.

== Safety ==
New methylene blue is toxic. Skin contact or inhalation should be avoided.

== See also ==
- Brilliant cresyl blue
- Methylene blue
