= Transient erythroblastopenia of childhood =

- Specialty: Pediatrics, hematology

Transient erythroblastopenia of childhood (TEC) is a slowly developing anemia of early childhood characterized by gradual onset of pallor.

== Signs and symptoms ==
Individuals with TEC have a median age of presentation of 18–26 months; however, the disorder may occur in infants younger than 6 months and in children as old as age 10 years. Because of the gradual onset of the anemia, children are often healthier than expected from their low hemoglobin levels.

== Cause ==
The cause of TEC is unknown, but it thought to be triggered by a viral infection. While rare cases have been attributed to infection with parvovirus B19, the majority of cases are not related to parvovirus infection. This is in contrast to transient aplastic crisis, seen in patients with chronic disorders causing hemolysis such as sickle cell disease or hereditary spherocytosis, which is usually caused by parvovirus infection.

== Diagnosis ==
Children typically present with a moderate normocytic anemia (usual range: hemoglobin 5-8 g/dL) and reticulocytopenia. Mean corpuscular volume is usually normal for age. Hemoglobin F levels are also typically normal.

== Prognosis ==
Most patients recover completely within 1–2 months. However many reported cases have lasted 18–24 months and longer.
