= Brilliant cresyl blue =

Names
- IUPAC name (7-Amino-8-methylphenoxazin-3-ylidene)-diethylazanium dichlorozinc dichloride

Identifiers
CAS Number	81029-05-2
3D model (JSmol)	Interactive image
ChEBI	CHEBI:88168
ChemSpider	115040308
ECHA InfoCard	100.072.410
EC Number	279-675-0
PubChem CID	14126600
CompTox Dashboard (EPA)	DTXSID10965999 DTXSID001001724, DTXSID10965999
- InChI: InChI=1S/2C17H19N3O.4ClH.Zn/c2*1-4-20(5-2)12-6-7-14-16(9-12)21-17-10-13(18)11(3)8-15(17)19-14;;;;;/h2*6-10,18H,4-5H2,1-3H3;4*1H;/q;;;;;;+2/p-2 Key: OCKKUZVCJCWWHM-UHFFFAOYSA-L
- SMILES: CC[N+](=C1C=CC2=NC3=C(C=C(C(=C3)C)N)OC2=C1)CC.CC[N+](=C1C=CC2=NC3=C(C=C(C(=C3)C)N)OC2=C1)CC.[Cl-].[Cl-].Cl[Zn]Cl

Properties
Chemical formula	(C_{17}H_{20}ClN_{3}O)_{2}·ZnCl_{2}
Molar mass	385.96 g/mol
Melting point	233–236 °C (451–457 °F; 506–509 K)
- Except where otherwise noted, data are given for materials in their standard state (at 25 °C [77 °F], 100 kPa). Infobox references

Brilliant cresyl blue is a supravital stain used for counting reticulocytes. It is classified as an oxazine dye. N95 dust masks, eye shields, and gloves must all be worn when handling the chemical.
