= Titan yellow =

Organic dye

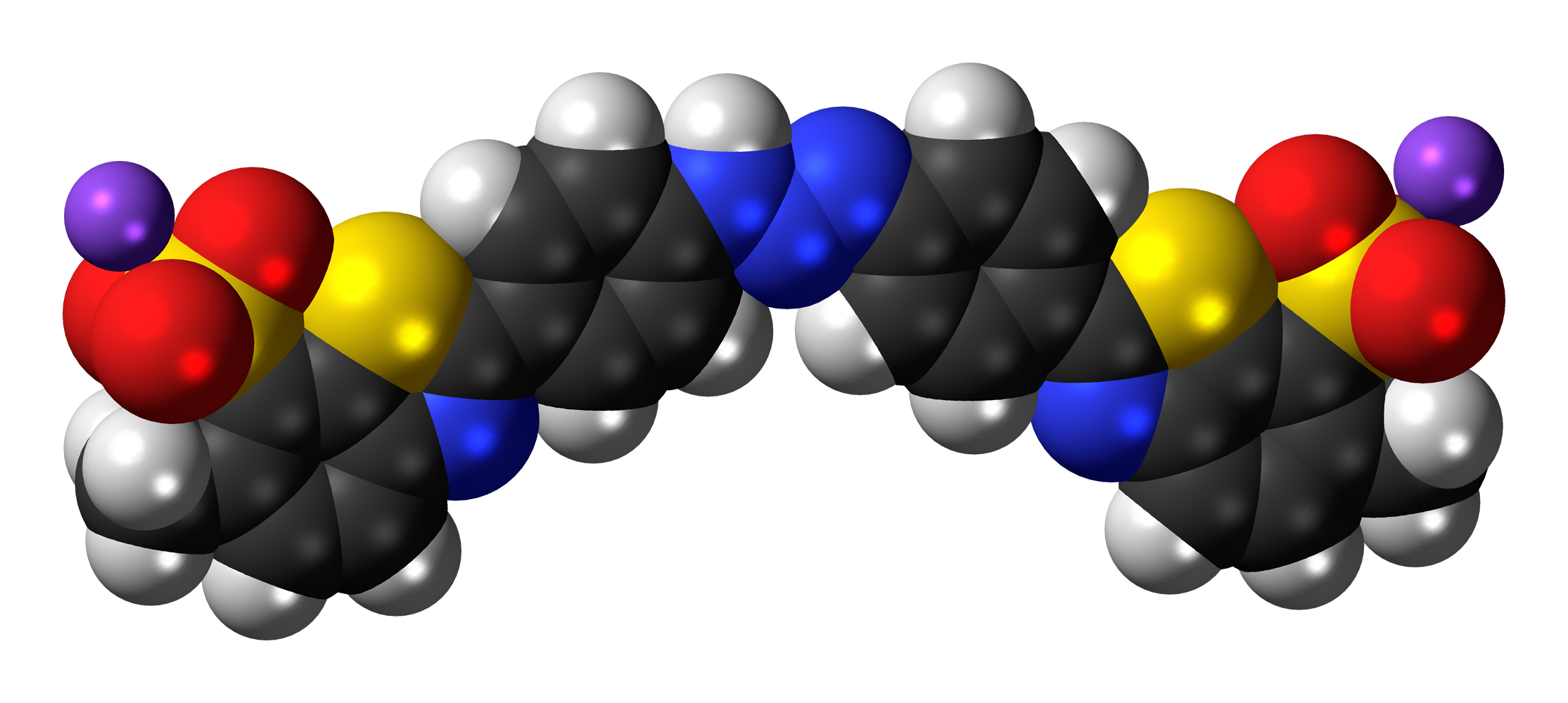

Names
- Preferred IUPAC name Disodium 2,2′-[(1E)-triaz-1-ene-1,3-diyldi(4,1-phenylene)]bis(6-methyl-1,3-benzothiazole-7-sulfonate)
- Other names Thiazole Yellow G; Clayton Yellow; C.I. 19540; C.I. Direct Yellow 9

Identifiers
CAS Number	1829-00-1
3D model (JSmol)	Interactive image
ChemSpider	65972
ECHA InfoCard	100.015.798
PubChem CID	73217
UNII	XL4T724PIZ
CompTox Dashboard (EPA)	DTXSID5062005
- InChI: InChI=1S/C28H21N5O6S4.2Na/c1-15-3-13-21-23(25(15)42(34,35)36)40-27(29-21)17-5-9-19(10-6-17)31-33-32-20-11-7-18(8-12-20)28-30-22-14-4-16(2)26(24(22)41-28)43(37,38)39;;/h3-14H,1-2H3,(H,31,32)(H,34,35,36)(H,37,38,39);;/q;2*+1/p-2
- SMILES: [Na+].[Na+].[O-]S(=O)(=O)c2c(ccc1nc(sc12)c6ccc(/N=N/Nc5ccc(c3nc4ccc(c(c4s3)S([O-])(=O)=O)C)cc5)cc6)C

Properties
Chemical formula	C_{28}H_{19}N_{5}Na_{2}O_{6}S_{4}
Molar mass	695.720 g/mol
- Except where otherwise noted, data are given for materials in their standard state (at 25 °C [77 °F], 100 kPa). Infobox references

Titan yellow is a compound with formula C_{28}H_{19}N_{5}Na_{2}O_{6}S_{4}. It is a triazene dye used as a stain and fluorescent indicator in microscopy. It is also used for the colorimetric indication of various compounds and is an acid-base indicator. As an acid-base indicator, it changes color from yellow to red between pH 12 and pH 13.

== See also ==
- Direct Yellow 4
