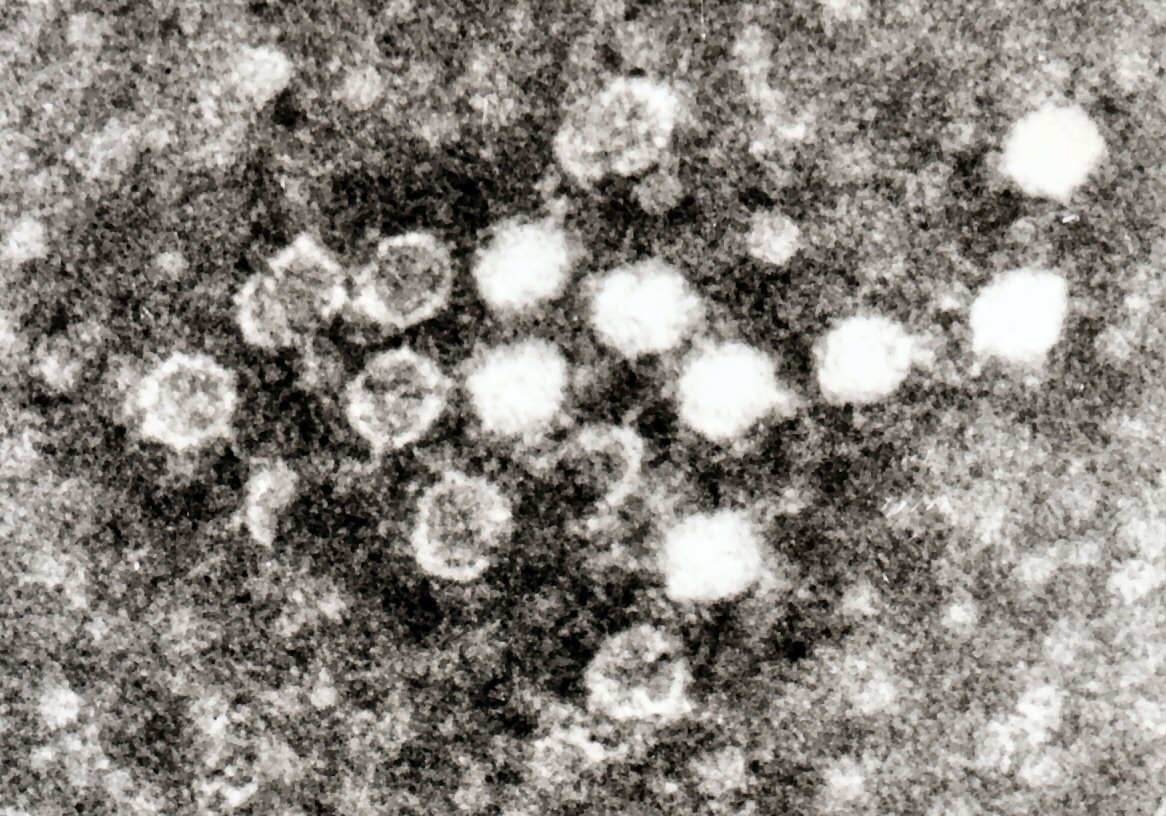
- Electron micrograph of Parvoviruses in blood

Virus classification
- (unranked): Virus
- Realm: Floreoviria
- Kingdom: Shotokuvirae
- Phylum: Cossaviricota
- Class: Quintoviricetes
- Order: Piccovirales
- Family: Parvoviridae
- Genus: Erythroparvovirus
- Species: Erythroparvovirus primate1

Synonyms
- B19 virus; Erythrovirus B19; Human parvovirus B19; B19V

= Parvovirus B19 =

Human virus that infects RBC precursors

Parvovirus B19 (also called B19 virus (B19V), Human parvovirus B19, or sometimes erythrovirus B19) is a human virus most known for causing disease in children, though it can also affect adults. It is the classic cause of the childhood rash called fifth disease or erythema infectiosum. The virus's name is derived from Latin parvum, meaning 'small', as B19 ranks among the smallest DNA viruses, measuring only 23–26 nm in diameter. The virus was discovered by chance in 1975 by Australian virologist Yvonne Cossart. The name B19 originated from the coding of a serum sample, number 19 in panel B.

== Virology ==
Erythroviruses belong to the Parvoviridae family of small DNA viruses. It is in the genus Erythroparvovirus and assigned to the species Erythroparvovirus primate1. Human parvovirus B19 is a non-enveloped, icosahedral virus that contains a single-stranded linear DNA genome of approximately 5,600 base pairs in length. B19V's nonenveloped viral particles are ~22 to 24 nm in diameter which are quite small compared to other parvoviruses. The infectious particles may contain either positive or negative strands of DNA. The icosahedral capsid consists of 60 capsomeres, consisting of two structural proteins, VP1 (83 kDa) and VP2 (58 kDa), which are identical except for 227 amino acids at the amino-terminal of the VP1-protein, the so-called VP1-unique region. VP2 is the major capsid protein, and comprises approximately 95% of the total virus particle. VP1-proteins are incorporated into the capsid structure in a non-stoichiometrical relation (based on antibody-binding analysis and X-ray structural analysis the VP1-unique (VP1u) region is assumed to be exposed at the surface of the virus particle. VP1u is located in the N-terminus of the VP1. At each end of the DNA molecule there are palindromic sequences which form "hairpin" loops. The hairpin at the 3' end serves as a primer for the DNA polymerase. It is classified as an erythrovirus because of its capability to invade red blood cell precursors in the bone marrow. Three genotypes (with subtypes) have been recognised.

The genome of human parvovirus B19 encodes four other proteins in addition to VP1 and VP2 and also some smaller proteins whose function is still unknown. The most notable of these is the large nonstructural protein commonly referred to as NS1. NS1 is a multifunctional protein that has a role in binding and operating on the p6 promoter which gives NS1 the ability to control the transcription of the B19V genome. NS1 binds and cleaves DNA in a sequence specific manner via restriction endonuclease activity of an N-terminal domain. Only single stranded DNA is cleaved, but double stranded DNA is preferentially bound, with high cooperativity that facilitates the binding of multiple NS1 units. NS1 is responsible for the regulation of certain cellular promoters including the p21/WAF1 promoter, and is thought to regulate the virus' own promoter. The 11 kDa protein encoded by the viral genome has been implicated in viral DNA replication.

The nucleotide substitution rate for total coding DNA has been estimated to be 1.03 (0.6-1.27) × 10^{−4} substitutions/site/year. This rate is similar to that of other single-stranded DNA viruses. VP2 codons were found to be under purifying selection. In contrast VP1 codons in the unique part of the gene were found to be under diversifying selection. This diversifying selection is consistent with persistent infection as this part of the VP1 protein contains epitopes recognised by the immune system.

Like other nonenveloped DNA viruses, pathogenicity of parvovirus B19 involves binding to host cell receptors, internalization, translocation of the genome to the host nucleus, DNA replication, RNA transcription, assembly of capsids and packaging of the genome, and finally cell lysis with release of the mature virions. In humans the P antigen (also known as globoside) is the cellular receptor for parvovirus B19 virus that causes erythema infectiosum (fifth disease) in children. This infection is sometimes complicated by severe aplastic anemia caused by lysis of early erythroid precursors.

Studies of Parvovirus B19 (B19V) have provided insights into its persistence and integration within human tissues. Analyses revealed that B19V primarily resides in endothelial cells, monocytes, and B cells, with few documented integration events in vivo. Although B19V DNA integration has been observed in vitro, its low prevalence in sampled tissues suggests that alternative mechanisms may contribute to lifelong persistence. In one case involving pulmonary carcinoma, a B19V integration junction was found in the colon, indicating possible interactions with host genomic elements.

=== Evolution ===
The most recent common ancestor of the extant strains has been dated to about 12,600 years ago. Three genotypes—1, 2 and 3—are recognised. A recombination between types 1 and 3 gave rise to genotype 2 between 5,000 and 6,800 years ago.

== Transmission ==
The virus is primarily spread by infected respiratory droplets; however, blood-borne transmission has also been reported. The secondary attack risk for exposed household persons is about 50%, and about half of that for classroom contacts. Transmission can happen from a mother that has B19V infection during pregnancy. The baby can get infected by bloodstream and therefore develop a severe anemia.

== Infectivity and symptoms ==
Two out of ten infected people do not experience any symptoms but are still highly infective. The B19V infection starts with flu-like symptoms consisting of fever, headache, runny nose, sore throat, joint pain and rash. Symptoms begin some six days after exposure (between 4 and 28 days, with the average being 16 to 17 days) and last about a week. The rash that children experience will appear after few days after the initial symptoms and can spread all over the body.

Infected patients with normal immune systems are contagious before becoming symptomatic, but probably not after. Individuals with B19 IgG antibodies are generally considered immune to recurrent infection, but reinfection is possible in a minority of cases. About half of adults are B19-immune due to a past infection.

Immunocompromised patients (organ transplant, HIV etc.) are prone to complications that affect the nerves, joints or bloodstream.

== Epidemiology ==
A significant increase in the number of cases is seen every three to four years; the last epidemic year was 1998. Outbreaks can arise especially in nurseries and schools.

Parvovirus B19 causes an infection in humans only. Cat and dog parvoviruses do not infect humans due to animals having their own parvoviruses. There is always a possibility for a spillover. There is no vaccine available for human parvovirus B19, though attempts have been made to develop one.

== Role in disease ==
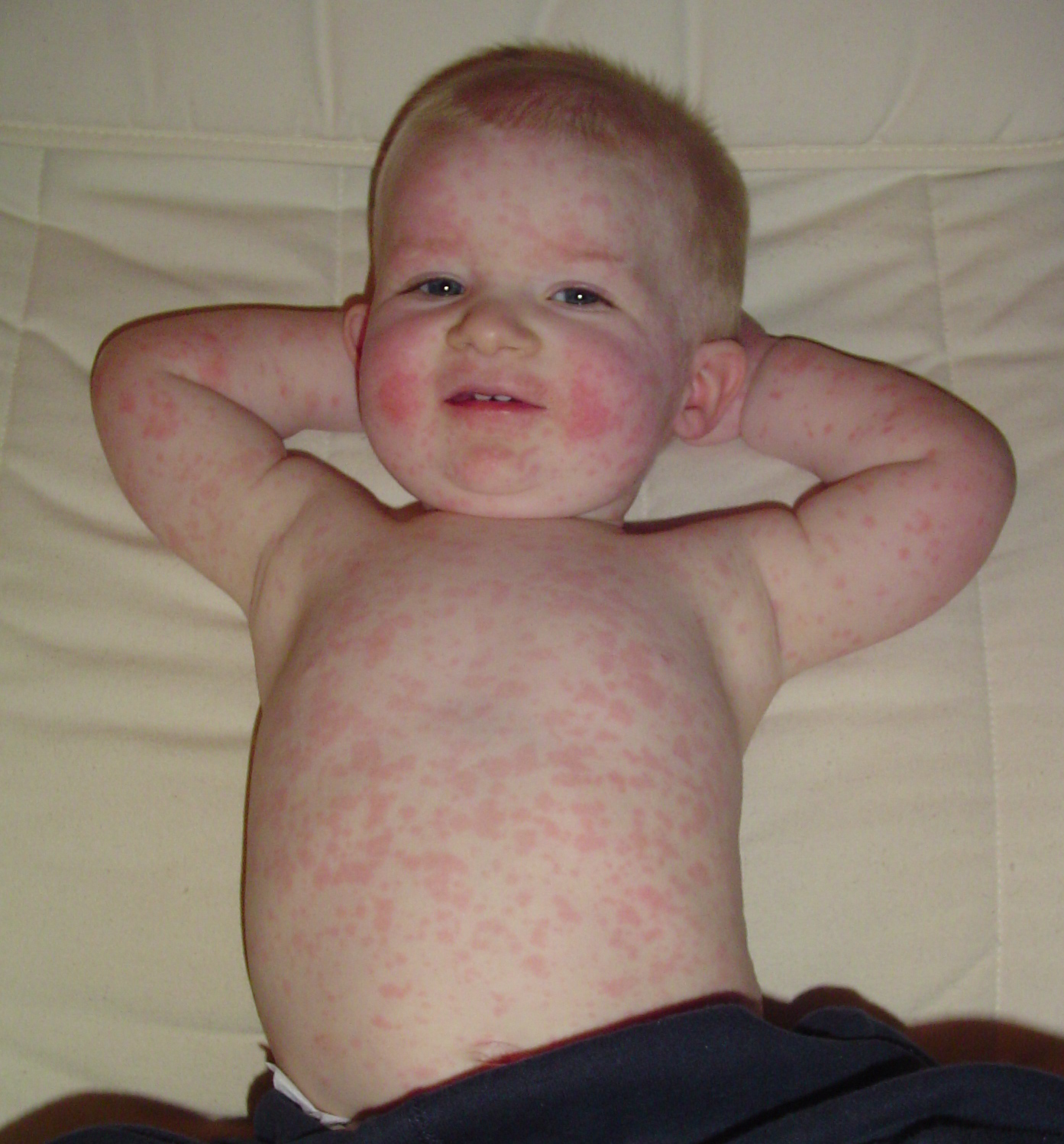
Child showing signs of erythema infectiosum, also known as fifth disease

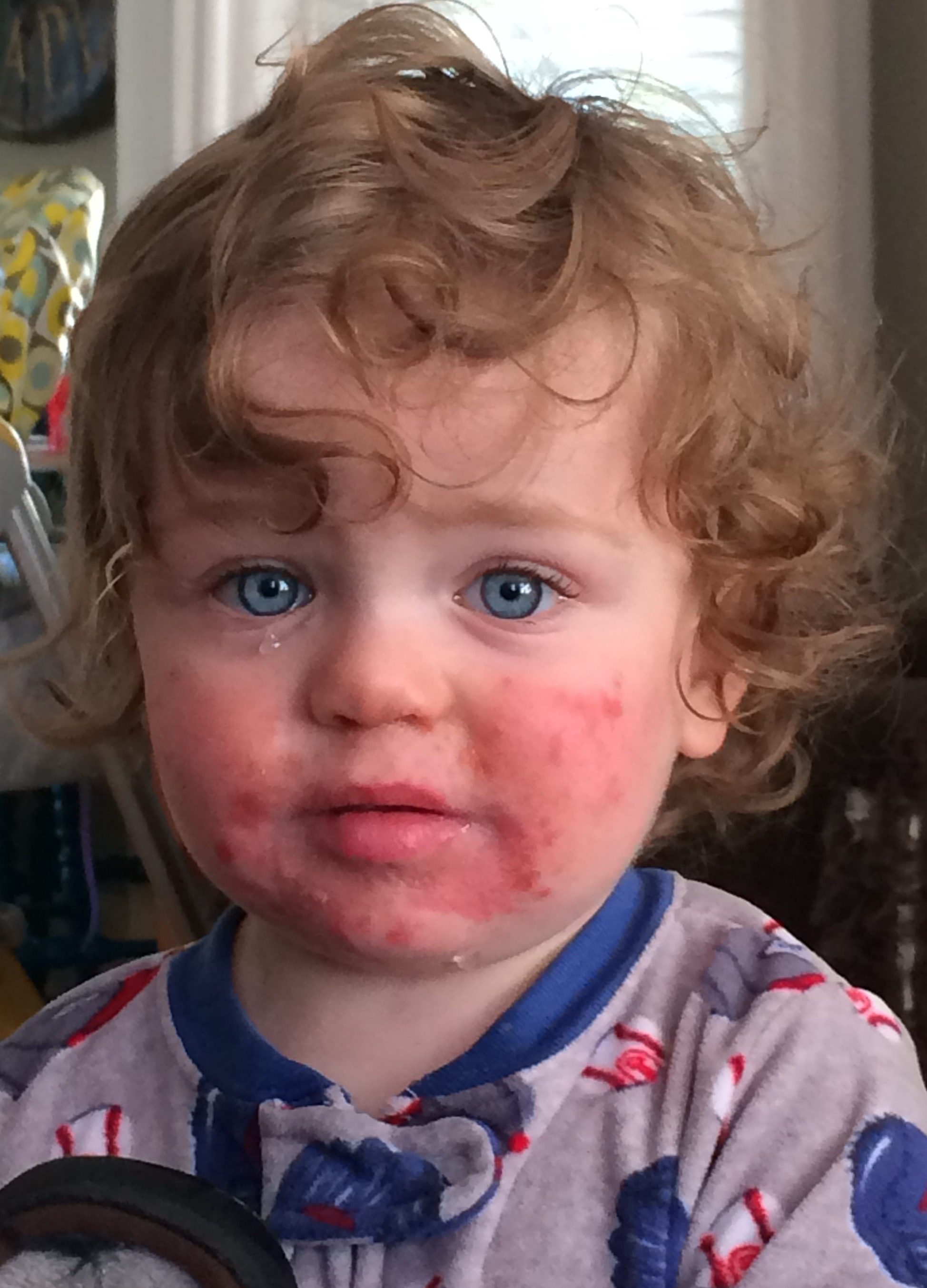
The "slapped cheek" appearance typical of fifth disease

=== Fifth disease ===
Fifth disease or erythema infectiosum is only one of several expressions of parvovirus B19. The associated bright red rash of the cheeks gives it the nickname "slapped cheek syndrome". Any age may be affected, although it is most common in children aged six to ten years. It is so named because it was the fifth most common cause of a pink-red infection associated rash to be described by physicians (many of the others, such as measles and rubella, are rare now).

Once infected, patients usually develop the illness after an incubation period of four to fourteen days. The disease commences with high fever and malaise, when the virus is most abundant in the bloodstream, and patients are usually no longer infectious once the characteristic rash of this disease has appeared. The following symptoms are characteristic:

- A usual brief viral prodrome with fever, headache, nausea, diarrhea.
- As the fever breaks, a red rash forms on the cheeks, with relative pallor around the mouth ("slapped cheek rash"), sparing the nasolabial folds, forehead, and mouth.
- "Lace-like, (reticular)" red rash on trunk or extremities then follows the facial rash. Infection in adults usually only involves the reticular rash, with multiple joint pain predominating.
- Exacerbation of rash by sunlight, heat, stress.

=== Papular purpuric gloves and socks syndrome ===
Teenagers or young adults may develop the so-called papular purpuric gloves and socks syndrome. It is a cutaneous condition characterized by pruritus, edema, and erythema of the hands and feet. In 1996, an association with parvovirus B19 was described, after virus was demonstrated in skin biopsy samples, subsequently corroborated in numerous publications.

=== Polyarthropathy syndrome ===
Arthralgias and arthritis are commonly reported in association with parvovirus B19 infection in adults in the absence of skin findings. The occurrence of arthralgia coincides with the initial detection of circulating IgM- and IgG-antibodies against the viral structural proteins VP1 and VP2. Parvovirus B19 infection may affect the development of arthritis. In adults (and perhaps some children), parvovirus B19 can lead to a seronegative arthritis which is usually easily controlled with analgesics. Women are approximately twice as likely as men to experience arthritis after parvovirus infection. Possibly up to 15% of all new cases of arthritis are due to parvovirus, and a history of recent contact with a patient and positive serology generally confirms the diagnosis. This arthritis does not progress to other forms of arthritis. Typically joint symptoms last 1–3 weeks, but in 10–20% of those affected, it may last weeks to months. A Danish study has links between B19 with polymyalgia rheumatica.

=== Aplastic crisis and chronic erythroid hypoplasia ===
Although most patients have a decrease of erythropoiesis (production of red blood cells) during parvovirus infection, it is most dangerous in patients with pre-existing bone marrow stress, for example sickle cell anemia or hereditary spherocytosis, and are therefore heavily dependent on erythropoiesis due to the reduced lifespan of the red cells. This is termed "aplastic crisis" (also called reticulocytopenia). It is treated with blood transfusion.

Parvovirus B19 is a cause of chronic anemia in individuals with immunodeficiency, receiving immunosuppressive therapy or with HIV infection. Treatment with intravenous immunoglobulin usually resolves the anemia although relapse can occur. Parvovirus infection may trigger an inflammatory reaction in AIDS patients who have just begun antiretroviral therapy.

=== Hydrops fetalis ===
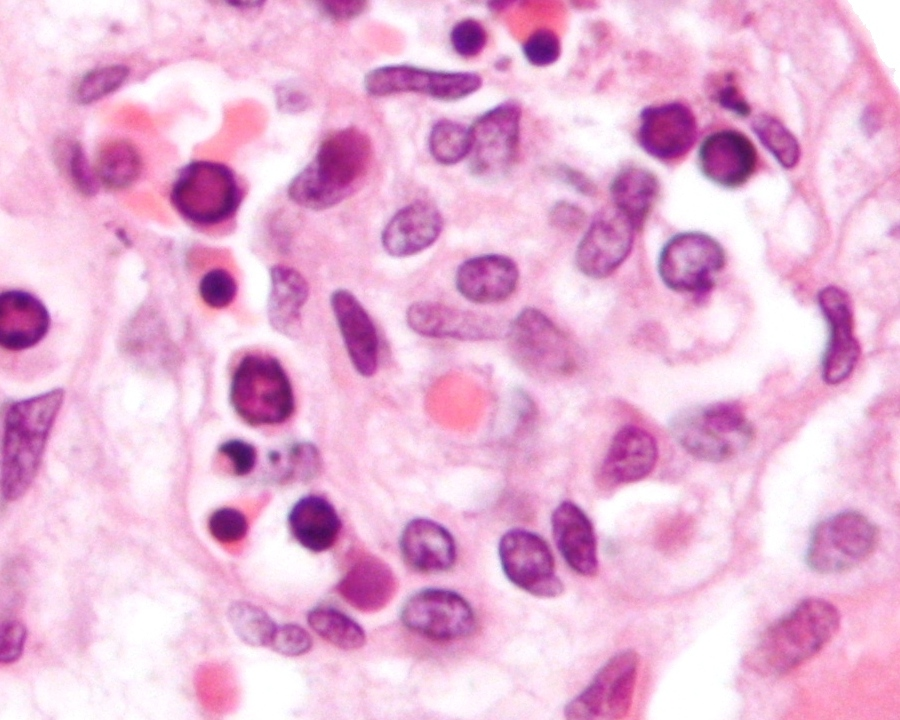
Micrograph showing viral changes in fetal red blood cells in a case of parvovirus infection. H&E stain

Parvovirus infection in pregnant women is associated with hydrops fetalis due to severe fetal anemia, sometimes leading to miscarriage or stillbirth. This is due to a combination of hemolysis of the red blood cells, as well as the virus directly negatively affecting the red blood cell precursors in the bone marrow. The risk of fetal loss is about 10% if infection occurs before pregnancy week 20 (especially between weeks 14 and 20), but minimal after then. Routine screening of the antenatal sample would enable the pregnant mother to determine the risk of infection. Knowledge of her status would allow the mother to avoid contact with individuals suspected or known to have an ongoing infection, however, at the present time, antenatal testing for immunity is not recommended, since there is no good means to prevent the infection, there is no specific therapy and there are no vaccines available. It may increase maternal anxiety and fear without proven benefit. The best approach would be to recommend all pregnant women to avoid contact with children with current symptoms of infection, as described above. The risk to the fetus will be reduced with correct diagnosis of the anemia (by ultrasound scans) and treatment (by blood transfusions). There is some evidence that intrauterine parvovirus B19 infection leads to developmental abnormalities in childhood.

== Treatment ==
At the moment, there are no treatments that directly target parvovirus B19 virus. Intravenous immunoglobulin therapy (IVIG) therapy has been a popular alternative because doctors can administer it without stopping chemotherapy drugs like MEL-ASCT. Also, the treatment's side effects are rare as only 4 out of 133 patients had complications (2 had acute kidney injury and 2 had pulmonary edema) even though 69 of the patients had organ transplants and 39 of them were HIV positive. This is a large improvement over administering rituximab. The monoclonal antibody against the CD20 protein has been shown to cause acute hepatitis, neutropenia via parvovirus B19 reactivations, and even persistent parvovirus B19 infection. IVIG therapy is not perfect; 34% of treated patients have a relapse after 4 months.

=== Diagnostics and vaccination ===
There is no routine laboratory test for B19V, but in case of the doctor is suspecting a B19V infection patient's blood will be drawn. The blood is then tested for antibodies.

As of 2020, no approved human vaccine existed against parvovirus B19. Bernstein et al. tested in 2011 a possible candidate vaccine that was produced in insect cells, VP2/VP1 VLPs (virus-like particle) were used. This vaccine was approved to the I clinical phase but was stopped due to unexplained reactions in patients.

== See also ==
- Human bocavirus
- Erythema infectiosum
