= Supravital staining =

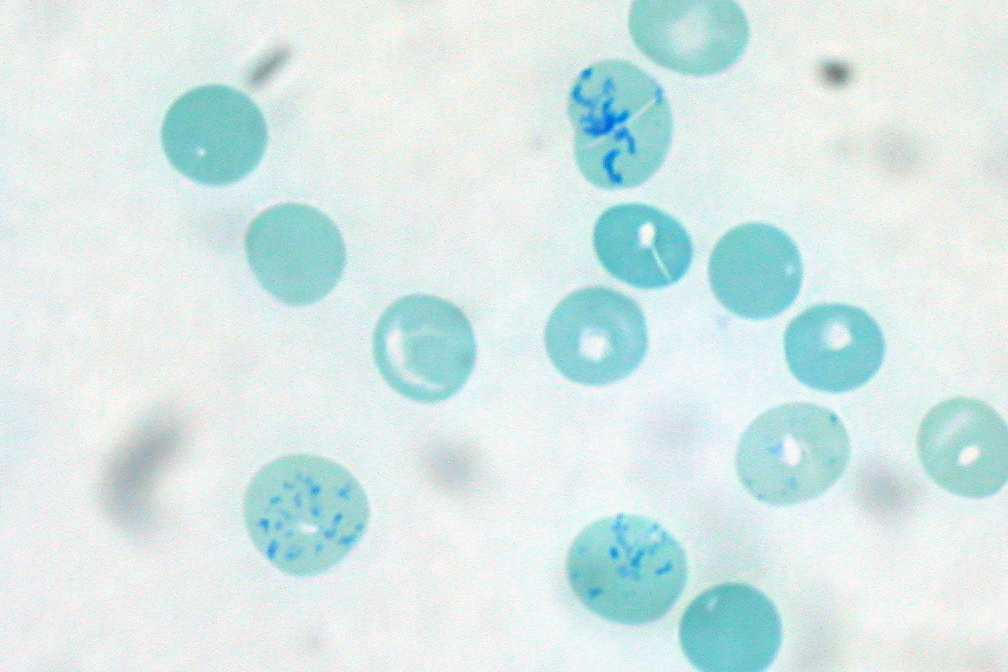
Supravital stain of a smear of human blood from a patient with hemolytic anemia. The reticulocytes are the cells with the dark blue dots and curved linear structures (reticulum) in the cytoplasm.

Supravital staining is a method of staining used in microscopy to examine living cells that have been removed from an organism. It differs from intravital staining, which is done by injecting or otherwise introducing the stain into the body. Thus a supravital stain may have a greater toxicity, as only a few cells need to survive it a short while. The term "vital stain" is used by some authors to refer specifically to an intravital stain, and by others interchangeably with a supravital stain, the core concept being that the cell being examined is still alive. As the cells are alive and unfixed, outside the body, supravital stains are temporary in nature.

The most common supravital stain is performed on reticulocytes using new methylene blue or brilliant cresyl blue, which makes it possible to see the reticulofilamentous pattern of ribosomes characteristically precipitated in these live immature red blood cells by the supravital stains. By counting the number of such cells the rate of red blood cell formation can be determined, providing an insight into bone marrow activity and anemia. This is in contrast to vital staining, when the dye employed is one that is excluded from the living cells so that only dead cells are stained positively. (Vital stains include dyes like trypan blue and propidium iodide, which are either too bulky or too charged to cross the cell membrane, or which are actively rapidly pumped out by live cells.)

Supravital staining can be combined with cell surface antibody staining (immunofluorescence) for applications such as FACS analysis. Immunofluorescence can also be done within the interior of live cells by reversible cell permeabilization using the detergent Triton X-100. Adjusted carefully to the appropriate concentration for the number of cells, the pretreatment can permit access of molecules between 1 and 150 kilodaltons to the interior of the cell. Although antibodies may be used in a similar way in this context, the term "supravital stain" is typically reserved for smaller chemicals which possess suitable properties intrinsically.

== Examples of common supravital dyes ==
Supravital dyes for RBCs:

- New methylene blue
- Brilliant cresyl blue
- Crystal violet
- Methyl violet
- Nile blue
- Hoechst stain
