= Reticulocyte =

Immature red blood cell

- Reticulocytes

- Erythrocytes (mature cells)

Details
- Gives rise to: Red blood cells
- Location: Bone marrow (most), blood (some)

Identifiers
- Latin: reticulocytus
- MeSH: D012156
- TH: H2.00.04.1.01007
- FMA: 66785

In hematology, reticulocytes are immature red blood cells (RBCs). In the process of erythropoiesis (red blood cell formation), reticulocytes develop and mature in the bone marrow and then circulate for about a day in the blood stream before developing into mature red blood cells. Like mature red blood cells, in mammals, reticulocytes do not have a cell nucleus. They are called reticulocytes because of a reticular (mesh-like) network of ribosomal RNA that becomes visible under a microscope with certain stains such as new methylene blue and Romanowsky stain.

== Clinical significance ==
To accurately measure reticulocyte counts, automated counters use a combination of laser excitation, detectors and a fluorescent dye that marks RNA and DNA (such as titan yellow or polymethine).

Reticulocytes appear slightly bluer than other red cells when looked at with the normal Romanowsky stain. Reticulocytes are also relatively large, a characteristic that is described by the mean corpuscular volume.

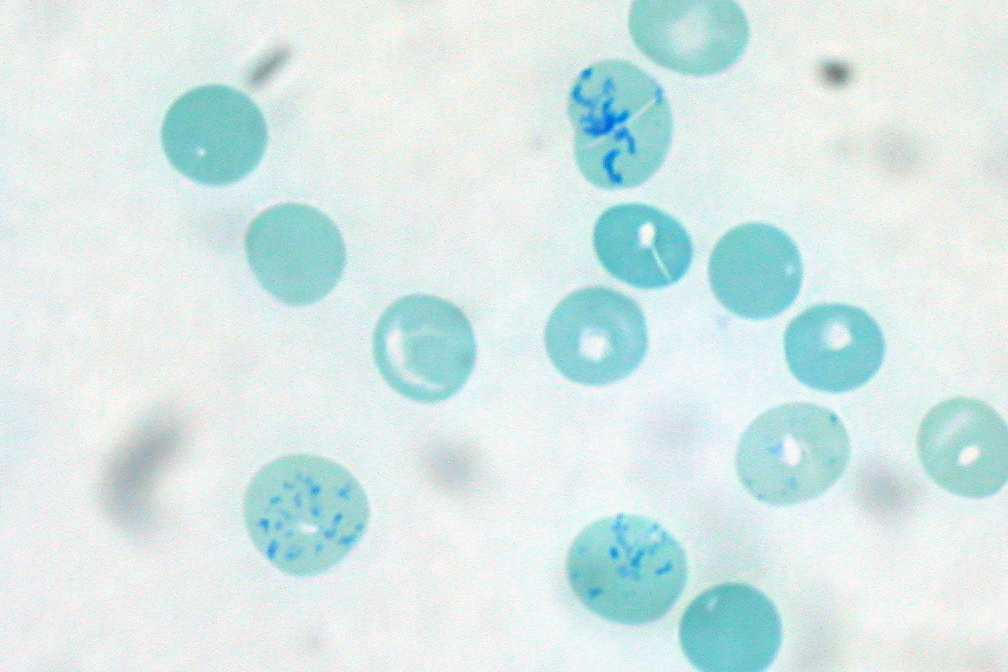
Supravital stain of a smear of human blood from a patient with hemolytic anemia. The reticulocytes are the cells with the dark blue dots and curved linear structures (reticulum) in the cytoplasm.

The normal fraction of reticulocytes in the blood depends on the clinical situation but is usually 0.5% to 2.5% in adults and 2% to 6% in infants. A reticulocyte percentage that is higher than "normal" can be a sign of anemia, but this depends on the health of a person's bone marrow. Calculating the reticulocyte production index is an important step in understanding whether or not the reticulocyte count is appropriate to the situation. This is often a more important question than whether the percentage is in the normal range; for instance, if someone is anemic but has a reticulocyte percentage of only 1%, the bone marrow is likely not producing new blood cells at a rate that will correct the anemia.

=== Immature reticulocyte fraction (IRF) ===
Reticulocytes at less mature levels can be detected by having higher intensity fluorescence regions. An increased immature reticulocyte fraction (IRF), specifically an IRF more than or equal to 0.23, together with an increased absolute reticulocyte count, generally indicates an adequate erythroid response to anemia. An IRF of more than 0.23 but a subnormal or normal absolute reticulocyte count (with a corresponding reticulocyte production index of less than or equal to 2) is seen in for example acute infection, iron deficiency anemia, human immunodeficiency virus infection, sickle disease with crisis, pregnancy, and myelodysplastic syndrome. An IRF of less than 0.23 is seen in diseases that lead to decreased erythropoietic activity, predominantly chronic renal insufficiency.

== Development ==
The development begins with the expulsion of the normoblast nucleus, and is followed by loss of organelles and remodeling of the plasma membrane, giving rise to an erythrocyte.

== Research ==
Reticulocytes are a valuable tool for biologists who study protein translation. Reticulocytes are unusual among cells in that they contain all of the machinery necessary to translate proteins but lack a nucleus. Since a cell's nucleus contains many components that make studying translation difficult, these cells are quite useful. Scientists can collect reticulocytes from animals such as rabbits and extract the mRNA and translation enzymes to study protein translation in a cell-free, in vitro system, allowing greater control over the environment in which proteins are being synthesized.
