= Human genetic resistance to malaria =

Human genetic adaptation

Human genetic resistance to malaria refers to inherited changes in the RNA of humans which increase resistance to malaria and result in increased survival of individuals with those genetic changes. The existence of these genotypes is likely due to evolutionary pressure exerted by parasites of the genus Plasmodium which cause malaria. Since malaria infects red blood cells, these genetic changes are most common alterations to molecules essential for red blood cell function (and therefore parasite survival), such as hemoglobin or other cellular proteins or enzymes of red blood cells. These alterations generally protect red blood cells from invasion by Plasmodium parasites or replication of parasites within the red blood cell.

These inherited changes to hemoglobin or other characteristic proteins, which are critical and rather invariant features of mammalian biochemistry, usually cause some kind of inherited disease. Therefore, they are commonly referred to by the names of the blood disorders associated with them, including sickle-cell disease, thalassemia, glucose-6-phosphate dehydrogenase deficiency, and others. These blood disorders cause increased morbidity and mortality in areas of the world where malaria is less prevalent.

== Development ==
Microscopic parasites, like viruses, protozoans that cause malaria, and others, cannot replicate on their own and rely on a host to continue their life cycles. They replicate by invading the hosts' cells and usurping the cellular machinery to replicate themselves. Eventually, unchecked replication causes the cells to burst, killing the cells and releasing the infectious organisms into the bloodstream where they can infect other cells. As cells die and toxic products of invasive organism replication accumulate, disease symptoms appear. Because this process involves specific proteins produced by the infectious organism as well as the host cell, even a very small change in a critical protein may render infection difficult or impossible. Such changes might arise by a process of mutation in the gene that codes for the protein. If the change is in the gamete, that is, the sperm or egg that join to form a zygote that grows into a human being, the protective mutation will be inherited. Since lethal diseases kill many persons who lack protective mutations, in time, many persons in regions where lethal diseases are endemic come to inherit protective mutations.

When the P. falciparum parasite infects a host cell, it alters the characteristics of the red blood cell membrane, making it "stickier" to other cells. Clusters of parasitized red blood cells can exceed the size of the capillary circulation, adhere to the endothelium, and block circulation. When these blockages form in the blood vessels surrounding the brain, they cause cerebral hypoxia, resulting in neurological symptoms known as cerebral malaria. This condition is characterized by confusion, disorientation, and often terminal coma. It accounts for 80% of malaria deaths. Therefore, mutations that protect against malaria infection and lethality pose a significant advantage.

Malaria has placed the strongest known selective pressure on the human genome since the origin of agriculture within the past 10,000 years. Plasmodium falciparum was probably not able to gain a foothold among African populations until larger sedentary communities emerged in association with the evolution of domestic agriculture in Africa (the agricultural revolution). Several inherited variants in red blood cells have become common in parts of the world where malaria is frequent as a result of selection exerted by this parasite. This selection was historically important as the first documented example of disease as an agent of natural selection in humans. It was also the first example of genetically controlled innate immunity that operates early in the course of infections, preceding adaptive immunity which exerts effects after several days. In malaria, as in other diseases, innate immunity leads into, and stimulates, adaptive immunity.

Mutations may have detrimental as well as beneficial effects, and any single mutation may have both. Infectiousness of malaria depends on specific proteins present in the cell walls and elsewhere in red blood cells. Protective mutations alter these proteins in ways that make them inaccessible to malaria organisms. However, these changes also alter the functioning and form of red blood cells that may have visible effects, either overtly, or by microscopic examination of red blood cells. These changes may impair the function of red blood cells in various ways that have a detrimental effect on the health or longevity of the individual. However, if the net effect of protection against malaria outweighs the other detrimental effects, the protective mutation will tend to be retained and propagated from generation to generation.

These alterations which protect against malarial infections but impair red blood cells are generally considered blood disorders since they tend to have overt and detrimental effects. Their protective function has only in recent times, been discovered and acknowledged. Some of these blood disorders are sickle-cell anemia, thalassaemia, glucose-6-phosphate dehydrogenase deficiency, ovalocytosis, elliptocytosis and loss of the Gerbich antigen and the Duffy antigen. These names refer to various proteins, enzymes, and the shape or function of red blood cells.

== Innate resistance ==
The potent effect of genetically controlled innate resistance is reflected in the probability of survival of young children in areas where malaria is endemic. It is necessary to study innate immunity in the susceptible age group (younger than four years) because, in older children and adults, the effects of innate immunity are overshadowed by those of adaptive immunity. It is also necessary to study populations in which random use of antimalarial drugs does not occur. Some early contributions on innate resistance to infections of vertebrates, including humans, are summarized in Table 1.

Table 1. Innate Resistance to Plasmodia
Year of discovery	Pathogen	Mechanism of resistance	Authors
1954	P. falciparum	Sickle-cell heterozygote	Allison
1975	P. knowlesi	Non-expression of Duffy antigen on red cells	Miller, et al.
1976	P. vivax	Non-expression of Duffy antigen on red cells	Miller et al.

It is remarkable that two of the pioneering studies were on malaria. The classical studies on the Toll receptor in Drosophila fruit fly were rapidly extended to Toll-like receptors in mammals and then to other pattern recognition receptors, which play important roles in innate immunity. However, the early contributions on malaria remain as classical examples of innate resistance, which have stood the test of time.

=== Mechanisms ===
The mechanisms by which erythrocytes containing abnormal hemoglobins, or are G6PD deficient, are partially protected against P. falciparum infections are not fully understood, although there has been no shortage of suggestions. During the peripheral blood stage of replication malaria parasites have a high rate of oxygen consumption and ingest large amounts of hemoglobin. It is likely that HbS in endocytic vesicles is deoxygenated, polymerizes and is poorly digested. In red cells containing abnormal hemoglobins, or which are G6PD deficient, oxygen radicals are produced, and malaria parasites induce additional oxidative stress. This can result in changes in red cell membranes, including translocation of phosphatidylserine to their surface, followed by macrophage recognition and ingestion. The authors suggest that this mechanism is likely to occur earlier in abnormal than in normal red cells, thereby restricting multiplication in the former. In addition, binding of parasitized sickle cells to endothelial cells is significantly decreased because of an altered display of P. falciparum erythrocyte membrane protein-1 (PfMP-1). This protein is the parasite's main cytoadherence ligand and virulence factor on the cell surface. During the late stages of parasite replication red cells are adherent to venous endothelium, and inhibiting this attachment could suppress replication.

Sickle hemoglobin induces the expression of heme oxygenase-1 in hematopoietic cells. Carbon monoxide, a byproduct of heme catabolism by heme oxygenase-1(HO-1), prevents an accumulation of circulating free heme after Plasmodium infection, suppressing the pathogenesis of experimental cerebral malaria. Other mechanisms, such as enhanced tolerance to disease mediated by HO-1 and reduced parasitic growth due to translocation of host micro-RNA into the parasite, have been described.

== Types of innate resistance ==
The first line of defense against malaria is mainly exerted by abnormal hemoglobins and glucose-6-phosphate dehydrogenase deficiency. The three major types of inherited genetic resistance – sickle cell disease, thalassemias, and G6PD deficiency – were present in the Mediterranean world by the time of the Roman Empire.

=== Hemoglobin abnormalities ===
==== Distribution ====
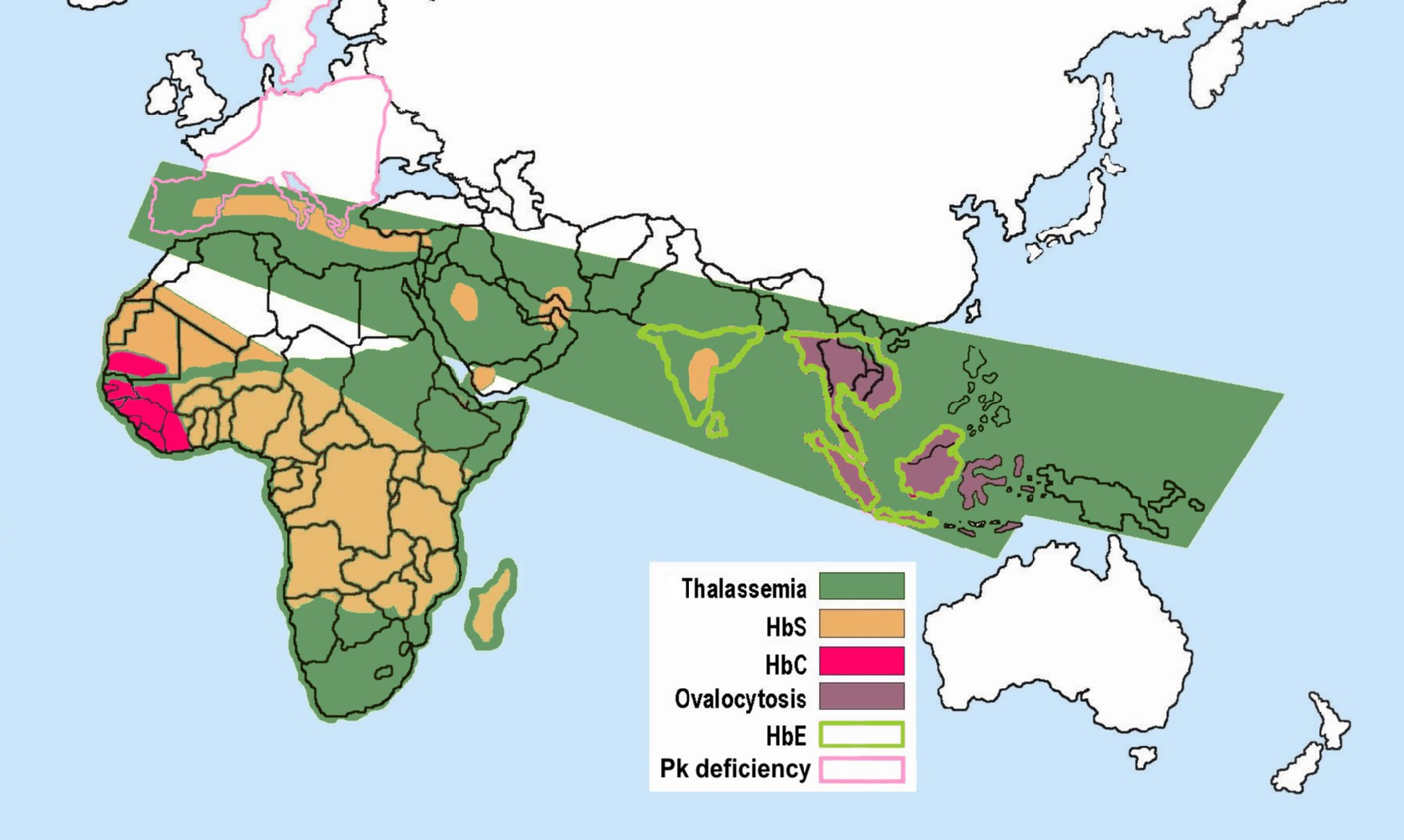
Old World distribution of hemoglobin-inherited disorders

Malaria does not occur in the cooler, drier climates of the highlands in the tropical and subtropical regions of the world. Tens of thousands of individuals have been studied, and high frequencies of abnormal hemoglobins have not been found in any population that was malaria-free. The frequencies of abnormal hemoglobins in different populations vary greatly, but some are undoubtedly polymorphic, having frequencies higher than expected by recurrent mutation. There is no longer doubt that malarial selection played a major role in the distribution of all these polymorphisms. All of these are in malarious areas,

- Sickle cell – The gene for HbS associated with sickle-cell is today distributed widely throughout sub-Saharan Africa, the Middle East, and parts of the Indian subcontinent, where carrier frequencies range from 5–40% or more of the population. Frequencies of sickle-cell heterozygotes were 20–40% in malarious areas of Kenya, Uganda, and Tanzania. Later studies by many investigators filled in the picture. High frequencies of the HbS gene are confined to a broad belt across Central Africa, but excluding most of Ethiopia and the East African highlands; this corresponds closely to areas of malaria transmission. Sickle-cell heterozygote frequencies up to 20% also occur in pockets of India and Greece that were formerly highly malarious.

The thalassemias have a high incidence in a broad band extending from the Mediterranean basin and parts of Africa, throughout the Middle East, the Indian subcontinent, Southeast Asia, Melanesia, and into the Pacific Islands.

- α-thalassemia, which attains frequencies of 30% in parts of West Africa;
- β-thalassemia, with frequencies up to 10% in parts of Italy;
- HbE, which attains frequencies up to 55% in Thailand and other Southeast Asian countries; HbE is found in the eastern half of the Indian subcontinent and throughout Southeast Asia, where, in some areas, carrier rates may exceed 60% of the population.
- HbC, which attains frequencies approaching 20% in northern Ghana and Burkina-Faso. HbC is restricted to parts of West and North Africa.
- concurrent polymorphisms – double heterozygotes for HbS and β-thalassemia, and for HbS and HbC, suffer from variant forms of sickle-cell disease, milder than SS but likely to reduce fitness before modern treatment was available. As predicted, these variant alleles tend to be mutually exclusive in populations. There is a negative correlation between frequencies of HbS and β-thalassemia in different parts of Greece and of HbS and HbC in West Africa. Where there is no adverse interaction of mutations, as in the case of abnormal hemoglobins and G6PD deficiency, a positive correlation of these variant alleles in populations would be expected and is found.

==== Sickle-cell ====
Sickle-cell disease was the genetic disorder to be linked to a mutation of a specific protein. Pauling introduced his fundamentally important concept of sickle cell anemia as a genetically transmitted molecular disease.

This vein (4) shows the interaction between the malaria sporozoites (6) with sickle cells (3) and regular cells (1). While malaria is still affecting the regular cells (2), the ratio of sickle to regular cells is 50/50 due to sickle cell anemia being a heterozygous trait, so the malaria cannot affect enough cells with schizonts (5) to harm the body.

The molecular basis of sickle cell anemia was finally elucidated in 1959 when Ingram perfected the techniques of tryptic peptide fingerprinting. In the mid-1950s, one of the newest and most reliable ways of separating peptides and amino acids was by means of the enzyme trypsin, which split polypeptide chains by specifically degrading the chemical bonds formed by the carboxyl groups of two amino acids, lysine and arginine. Small differences in hemoglobin A and S will result in small changes in one or more of these peptides . To try to detect these small differences, Ingram combined paper electrophoresis and the paper chromotography methods. By this combination he created a two-dimensional method that enabled him to comparatively "fingerprint" the hemoglobin S and A fragments he obtained from the trypsin digest. The fingerprints revealed approximately 30 peptide spots, there was one peptide spot clearly visible in the digest of haemoglobin S which was not obvious in the haemoglobin A fingerprint. The HbS gene defect is a mutation of a single nucleotide (A to T) of the β-globin gene replacing the amino acid glutamic acid with the less polar amino acid valine at the sixth position of the β chain.

HbS has a lower negative charge at physiological pH than does normal adult hemoglobin. The consequences of the simple replacement of a charged amino acid with a hydrophobic, neutral amino acid are far-ranging, Recent studies in West Africa suggest that the greatest impact of Hb S seems to be to protect against either death or severe disease—that is, profound anemia or cerebral malaria—while having less effect on infection per se. Children who are heterozygous for the sickle cell gene have only one-tenth the risk of death from falciparum as do those who are homozygous for the normal hemoglobin gene. Binding of parasitized sickle erythrocytes to endothelial cells and blood monocytes is significantly reduced due to an altered display of Plasmodium falciparum erythrocyte membrane protein 1 (PfEMP-1), the parasite's major cytoadherence ligand and virulence factor on the erythrocyte surface.

Protection also derives from the instability of sickle hemoglobin, which clusters the predominant integral red cell membrane protein (called band 3) and triggers accelerated removal by phagocytic cells. Natural antibodies recognize these clusters on senescent erythrocytes. Protection by HbAS involves the enhancement of not only innate but also of acquired immunity to the parasite. Prematurely denatured sickle hemoglobin results in an upregulation of natural antibodies which control erythrocyte adhesion in both malaria and sickle cell disease. Targeting the stimuli that lead to endothelial activation will constitute a promising therapeutic strategy to inhibit sickle red cell adhesion and vaso-occlusion.

This has led to the hypothesis that while homozygotes for the sickle cell gene suffer from disease, heterozygotes might be protected against malaria. Malaria remains a selective factor for the sickle cell trait.

==== Thalassemias ====
It has long been known that a kind of anemia, termed thalassemia, has a high frequency in some Mediterranean populations, including Greeks and southern Italians. The name is derived from the Greek words for sea (thalassa), meaning the Mediterranean Sea, and blood (haima). Vernon Ingram deserves the credit for explaining the genetic basis of different forms of thalassemia as an imbalance in the synthesis of the two polypeptide chains of hemoglobin.

In the common Mediterranean variant, mutations decrease production of the β-chain (β-thalassemia). In α-thalassemia, which is relatively frequent in Africa and several other countries, production of the α-chain of hemoglobin is impaired, and there is relative over-production of the β-chain. Individuals homozygous for β-thalassemia have severe anemia and are unlikely to survive and reproduce, so selection against the gene is strong. Those homozygous for α-thalassemia also suffer from anemia and there is some degree of selection against the gene.

The lower Himalayan foothills and Inner Terai or Doon Valleys of Nepal and India are highly malarial due to a warm climate and marshes sustained during the dry season by groundwater percolating down from the higher hills. Malarial forests were intentionally maintained by the rulers of Nepal as a defensive measure. Humans attempting to live in this zone suffered much higher mortality than at higher elevations or below on the drier Gangetic Plain. However, the Tharu people had lived in this zone long enough to evolve resistance via multiple genes. Medical studies among the Tharu and non-Tharu population of the Terai yielded the evidence that the prevalence of cases of residual malaria is nearly seven times lower among Tharus. The basis for resistance has been established to be homozygosity of α-Thalassemia gene within the local population. Endogamy along caste and ethnic lines appear to have prevented these genes from being more widespread in neighboring populations.

==== HbC and HbE erythroids ====
There is evidence that the persons with α-thalassemia, HbC and HbE have some degree of protection against the parasite. Hemoglobin C (HbC) is an abnormal hemoglobin with substitution of a lysine residue for glutamic acid residue of the β-globin chain, at exactly the same β-6 position as the HbS mutation. The "C" designation for HbC is from the name of the city where it was discovered—Christchurch, New Zealand. People who have this disease, particularly children, may have episodes of abdominal and joint pain, an enlarged spleen, and mild jaundice, but they do not have severe crises, as occur in sickle cell disease. Haemoglobin C is common in malarious areas of West Africa, especially in Burkina Faso. In a large case–control study performed in Burkina Faso on 4,348 Mossi subjects, that HbC was associated with a 29% reduction in risk of clinical malaria in HbAC heterozygotes and of 93% in HbCC homozygotes. HbC represents a 'slow but gratis' genetic adaptation to malaria through a transient polymorphism, compared to the polycentric 'quick but costly' adaptation through balanced polymorphism of HbS. HbC modifies the quantity and distribution of the variant antigen P. falciparum erythrocyte membrane protein 1 (PfEMP1) on the infected red blood cell surface and the modified display of malaria surface proteins reduces parasite adhesiveness (thereby avoiding clearance by the spleen) and can reduce the risk of severe disease.

Hemoglobin E is due to a single point mutation in the gene for the beta chain with a glutamate-to-lysine substitution at position 26. It is one of the most prevalent hemoglobinopathies with 30 million people affected. Hemoglobin E is very common in parts of Southeast Asia. HbE erythrocytes have an unidentified membrane abnormality that renders the majority of the RBC population relatively resistant to invasion by P falciparum.

=== Other erythrocyte mutations ===
Other genetic mutations besides hemoglobin abnormalities that confer resistance to Plasmodia infection involve alterations of the cellular surface antigenic proteins, cell membrane structural proteins, or enzymes involved in glycolysis.

==== Glucose-6-phosphate dehydrogenase deficiency ====
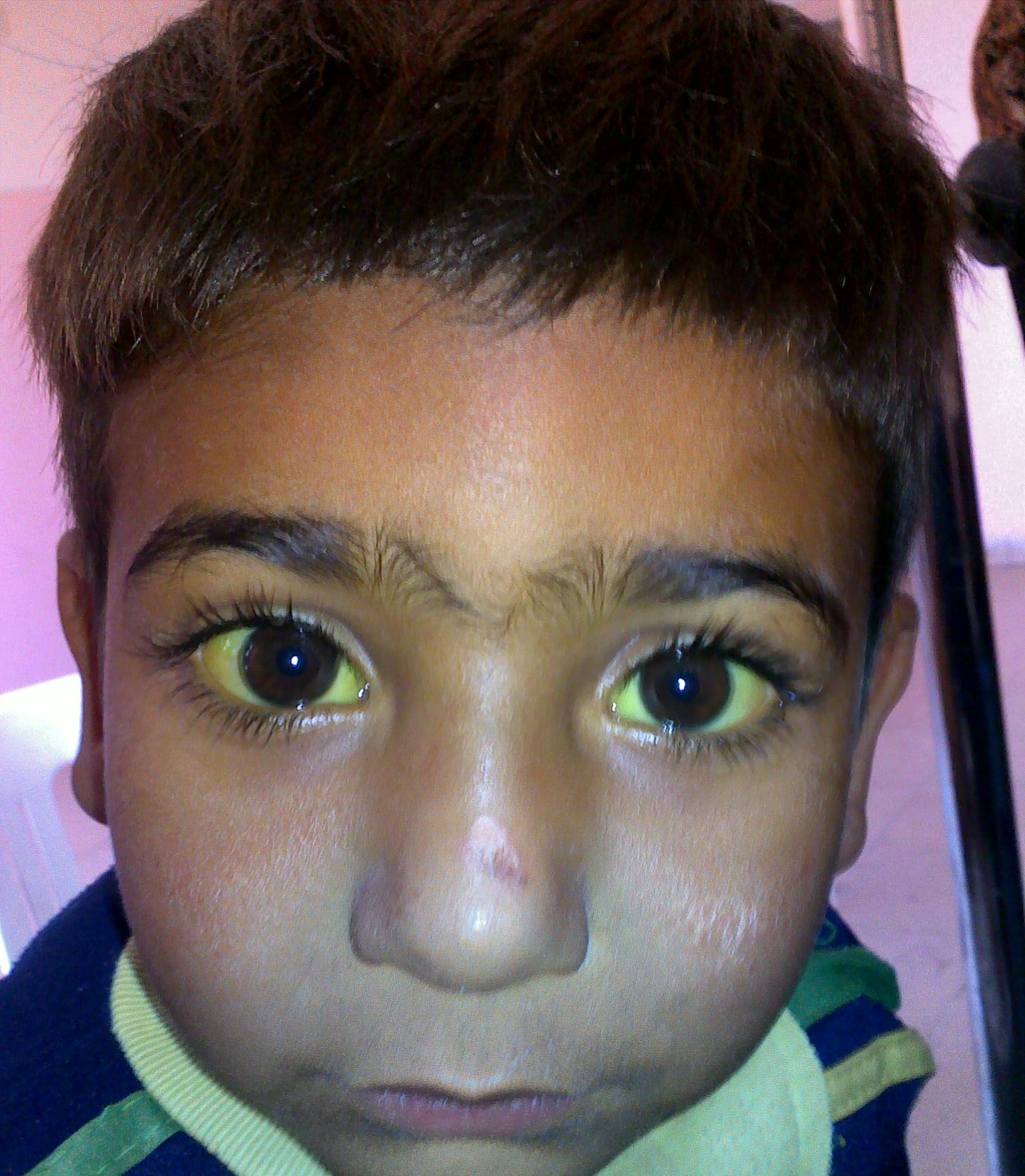
Hemolytic anemia due to G6PD deficiency following Fava beans consumption

Glucose-6-phosphate dehydrogenase (G6PD) is an important enzyme in red cells, metabolizing glucose through the pentose phosphate pathway, an anabolic alternative to catabolic oxidation (glycolysis), while maintaining a reducing environment. G6PD is present in all human cells but is particularly important to red blood cells. Since mature red blood cells lack nuclei and cytoplasmic RNA, they cannot synthesize new enzyme molecules to replace genetically abnormal or ageing ones. All proteins, including enzymes, have to last for the entire lifetime of the red blood cell, which is normally 120 days.

In 1956 Alving and colleagues showed that in some African Americans the antimalarial drug primaquine induces hemolytic anemia, and that those individuals have an inherited deficiency of G6PD in erythrocytes. G6PD deficiency is sex-linked, and common in Mediterranean, African and other populations. In Mediterranean countries such individuals can develop a hemolytic diathesis (favism) after consuming fava beans. G6PD deficient persons are also sensitive to several drugs in addition to primaquine.

G6PD deficiency is the second most common enzyme deficiency in humans (after ALDH2 deficiency), estimated to affect some 400 million people. There are many mutations at this locus, two of which attain frequencies of 20% or greater in African and Mediterranean populations; these are termed the A- and Med mutations. Mutant varieties of G6PD can be more unstable than the naturally occurring enzyme, so that their activity declines more rapidly as red cells age.

This question has been studied in isolated populations where antimalarial drugs were not used in Tanzania, East Africa and in the Republic of the Gambia, West Africa, following children during the period when they are most susceptible to falciparum malaria. In both cases parasite counts were significantly lower in G6PD-deficient persons than in those with normal red cell enzymes. The association has also been studied in individuals, which is possible because the enzyme deficiency is sex-linked and female heterozygotes are mosaics due to lyonization, where random inactivation of an X-chromosome in certain cells creates a population of G6PD deficient red blood cells coexisting with normal red blood cells. Malaria parasites were significantly more often observed in normal red cells than in enzyme-deficient cells. An evolutionary genetic analysis of malarial selection of G6PD deficiency genes has been published by Tishkoff and Verelli. The enzyme deficiency is common in many countries that are, or were formerly, malarious, but not elsewhere.

==== PK deficiency ====
Pyruvate kinase (PK) deficiency, also called erythrocyte pyruvate kinase deficiency, is an inherited metabolic disorder of the enzyme pyruvate kinase. In this condition, a lack of pyruvate kinase slows down the process of glycolysis. This effect is especially devastating in cells that lack mitochondria because these cells must use anaerobic glycolysis as their sole source of energy because the TCA cycle is not available. One example is red blood cells, which in a state of pyruvate kinase deficiency rapidly become deficient in ATP and can undergo hemolysis. Therefore, pyruvate kinase deficiency can cause hemolytic anemia.

There is a significant correlation between severity of PK deficiency and extent of protection against malaria.

==== Elliptocytosis ====
Elliptocytosis, a blood disorder in which an abnormally large number of the patient's erythrocytes are elliptical. There is much genetic variability amongst those affected. There are three major forms of hereditary elliptocytosis: common hereditary elliptocytosis, spherocytic elliptocytosis and southeast Asian ovalocytosis.

==== Southeast Asian ovalocytosis ====
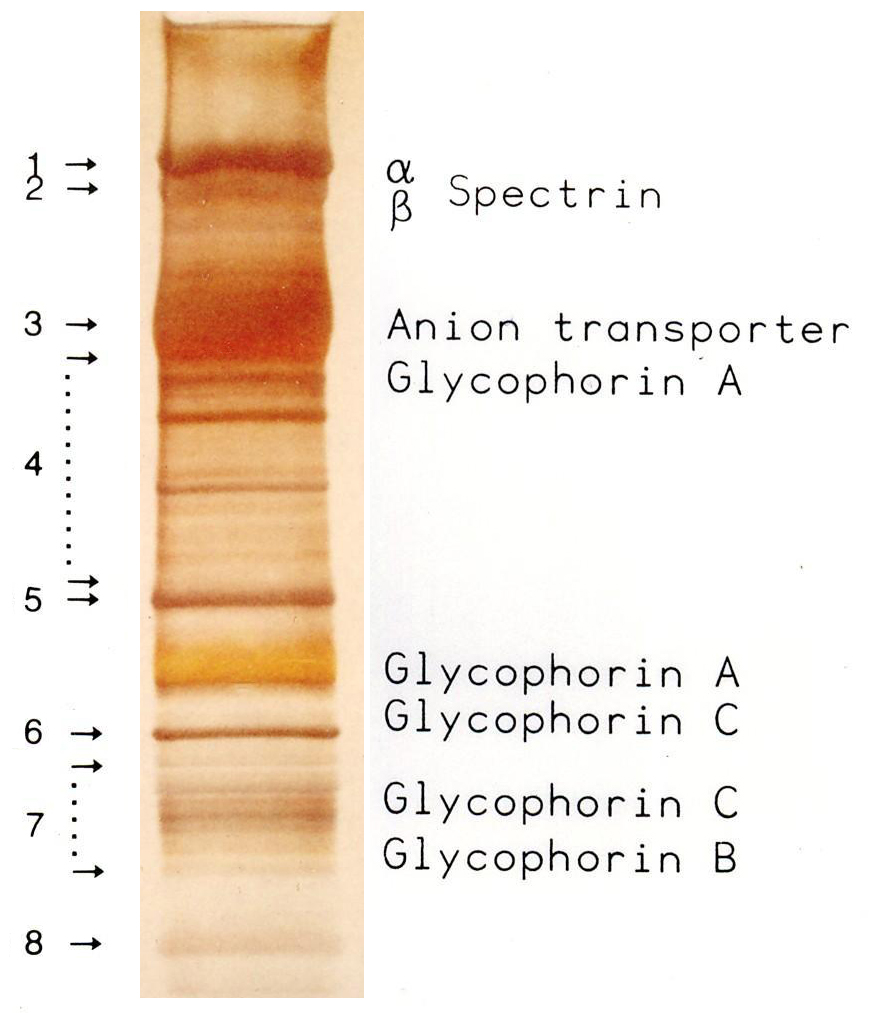
stained red blood cell membrane proteins on electrophoresis gel strip

Ovalocytosis is a subtype of elliptocytosis, and is an inherited condition in which erythrocytes have an oval instead of a round shape. In most populations ovalocytosis is rare, but South-East Asian ovalocytosis (SAO) occurs in as many as 15% of the indigenous people of Malaysia and of Papua New Guinea. Several abnormalities of SAO erythrocytes have been reported, including increased red cell rigidity and reduced expression of some red cell antigens. SAO is caused by a mutation in the gene encoding the erythrocyte band 3 protein. There is a deletion of codons 400–408 in the gene, leading to a deletion of 9 amino-acids at the boundary between the cytoplasmic and transmembrane domains of band 3 protein. Band 3 serves as the principal binding site for the membrane skeleton, a submembrane protein network composed of ankyrin, spectrin, actin, and band 4.1. Ovalocyte band 3 binds more tightly than normal band 3 to ankyrin, which connects the membrane skeleton to the band 3 anion transporter. These qualitative defects create a red blood cell membrane that is less tolerant of shear stress and more susceptible to permanent deformation.

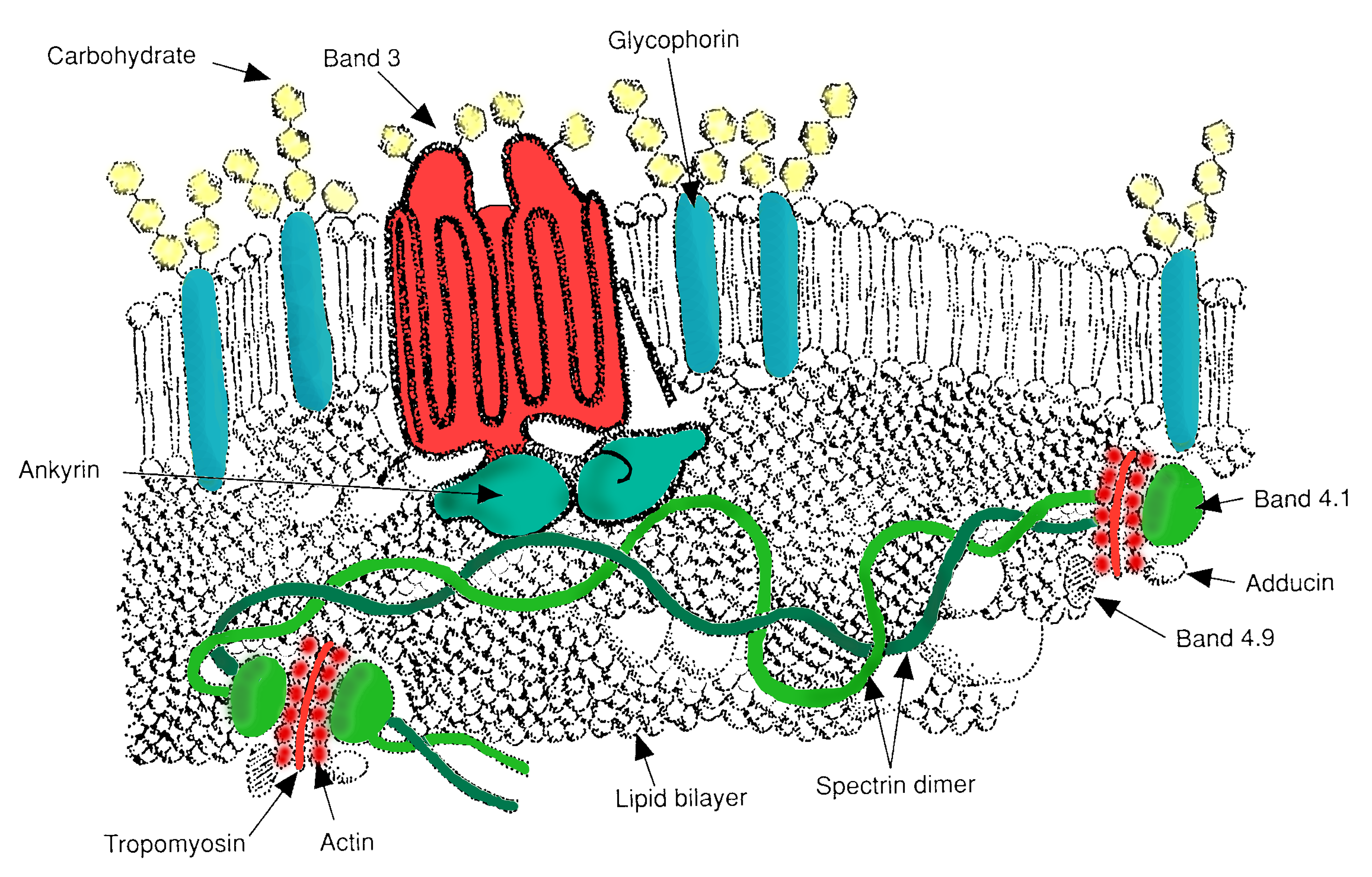
Red Blood Cell membrane major proteins

SAO is associated with protection against cerebral malaria in children because it reduces sequestration of erythrocytes parasitized by P. falciparum in the brain microvasculature. Adhesion of P. falciparum-infected red blood cells to CD36 is enhanced by the cerebral malaria-protective SAO trait . Higher efficiency of sequestration via CD36 in SAO individuals could determine a different organ distribution of sequestered infected red blood cells. These provide a possible explanation for the selective advantage conferred by SAO against cerebral malaria.

==== Duffy antigen receptor negativity ====
Plasmodium vivax has a wide distribution in tropical countries, but is absent or rare in a large region in West and Central Africa, as recently confirmed by PCR species typing. This gap in distribution has been attributed to the lack of expression of the Duffy antigen receptor for chemokines (DARC) on the red cells of many sub-Saharan Africans. Duffy negative individuals are homozygous for a DARC allele, carrying a single nucleotide mutation (DARC 46 T → C), which impairs promoter activity by disrupting a binding site for the hGATA1 erythroid lineage transcription factor. In widely cited in vitro and in vivo studies, Miller et al. reported that the Duffy blood group is the receptor for P. vivax and that the absence of the Duffy blood group on red cells is the resistance factor to P. vivax in persons of African descent. This has become a well-known example of innate resistance to an infectious agent because of the absence of a receptor for the agent on target cells.

However, observations have accumulated showing that the original Miller report needs qualification. In human studies of P. vivax transmission, there is evidence for the transmission of P. vivax among Duffy-negative populations in Western Kenya, the Brazilian Amazon region, and Madagascar. The Malagasy people on Madagascar have an admixture of Duffy-positive and Duffy-negative people of diverse ethnic backgrounds. 72% of the island population were found to be Duffy-negative. P. vivax positivity was found in 8.8% of 476 asymptomatic Duffy-negative people, and clinical P. vivax malaria was found in 17 such persons. Genotyping indicated that multiple P. vivax strains were invading the red cells of Duffy-negative people. The authors suggest that among Malagasy populations there are enough Duffy-positive people to maintain mosquito transmission and liver infection. More recently, Duffy negative individuals infected with two different strains of P. vivax were found in Angola and Equatorial Guinea; further, P. vivax infections were found both in humans and mosquitoes, which means that active transmission is occurring. The frequency of such transmission is still unknown. Because of these several reports from different parts of the world it is clear that some variants of P. vivax are being transmitted to humans who are not expressing DARC on their red cells. The same phenomenon has been observed in New World monkeys. (Note: P. vivax can be transmitted in Squirrel monkeys (Saimiri boliviensis and S. sciureus), and Barnwell et al. have obtained evidence that P. vivax enters Saimiri monkey red cells independently of the Duffy blood group, showing that P. vivax has an alternative pathway for invading these cells. The Duffy binding protein found on Plasmodia, the one and only invasion ligand for DARC, does not bind to Saimiri erythrocytes although these cells express DARC and obviously become infected with P. vivax.) However, DARC still appears to be a major receptor for human transmission of P. vivax.

The distribution of Duffy negativity in Africa does not correlate precisely with that of P. vivax transmission. Frequencies of Duffy negativity are as high in East Africa (above 80%), where the parasite is transmitted, as they are in West Africa, where it is not. The potency of P. vivax as an agent of natural selection is unknown and may vary from location to location. DARC negativity remains a good example of innate resistance to an infection, but it produces a relative and not an absolute resistance to P. vivax transmission.

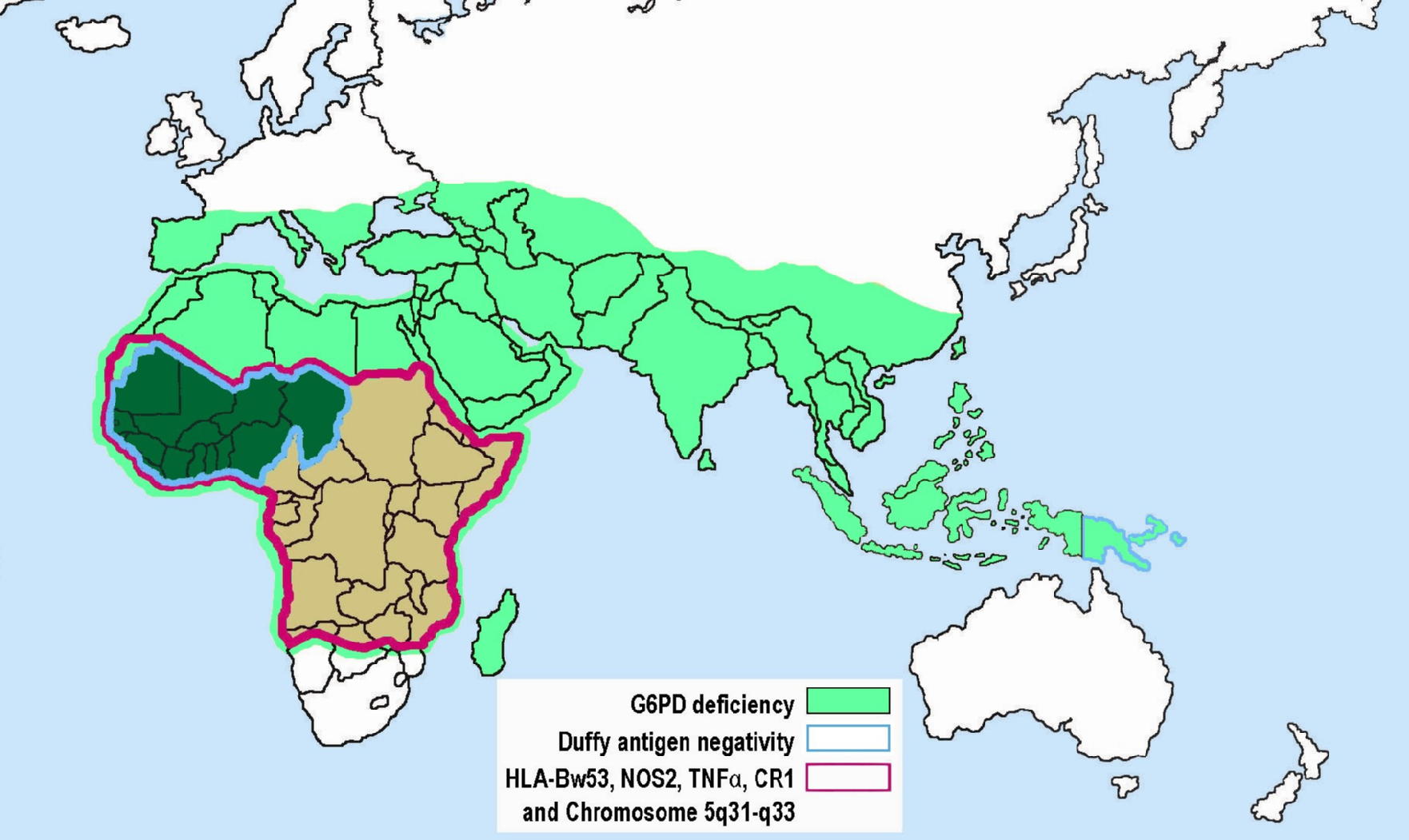
Old World distribution of enzymopathies and immunogenetic variants

==== Gerbich antigen receptor negativity ====
The Gerbich antigen system is an integral membrane protein of the erythrocyte and plays a functionally important role in maintaining erythrocyte shape. It also acts as the receptor for the P. falciparum erythrocyte binding protein. There are four alleles of the gene which encodes the antigen, Ge-1 to Ge-4. Three types of Ge antigen negativity are known: Ge-1,-2,-3, Ge-2,-3 and Ge-2,+3. persons with the relatively rare phenotype Ge-1,-2,-3, are less susceptible (~60% of the control rate) to invasion by P. falciparum. Such individuals have a subtype of a condition called hereditary elliptocytosis, characterized by oval or elliptical shape erythrocytes.

==== Other rare erythrocyte mutations ====
Rare mutations of glycophorin A and B proteins are also known to mediate resistance to P. falciparum.

=== Human leucocyte antigen polymorphisms ===
Human leucocyte antigen (HLA) polymorphisms common in West Africans but rare in other racial groups are associated with protection from severe malaria. This group of genes encodes cell-surface antigen-presenting proteins and has many other functions. In West Africa, they account for as great a reduction in disease incidence as the sickle-cell hemoglobin variant. The studies suggest that the unusual polymorphism of major histocompatibility complex genes has evolved primarily through natural selection by infectious pathogens.

Polymorphisms at the HLA loci, which encode proteins that participate in antigen presentation, influence the course of malaria. In West Africa an HLA class I antigen (HLA Bw53) and an HLA class II haplotype (DRB1*13OZ-DQB1*0501) are independently associated with protection against severe malaria. However, HLA correlations vary, depending on the genetic constitution of the polymorphic malaria parasite, which differs in different geographic locations.

=== Hereditary persistence of fetal hemoglobin ===
Some studies suggest that high levels of fetal hemoglobin (HbF) confer some protection against falciparum malaria in adults with Hereditary persistence of fetal hemoglobin.

== Validating the malaria hypothesis ==
Evolutionary biologist J.B.S. Haldane was the first to give a hypothesis on the relationship between malaria and the genetic disease. He first delivered his hypothesis at the Eighth International Congress of Genetics held in 1948 at Stockholm on a topic "The Rate of Mutation of Human Genes". He formalised in a technical paper published in 1949 in which he made a prophetic statement: "The corpuscles of the anaemic heterozygotes are smaller than normal, and more resistant to hypotonic solutions. It is at least conceivable that they are also more resistant to attacks by the sporozoa which cause malaria." This became known as 'Haldane's malaria hypothesis', or concisely, the 'malaria hypothesis'.

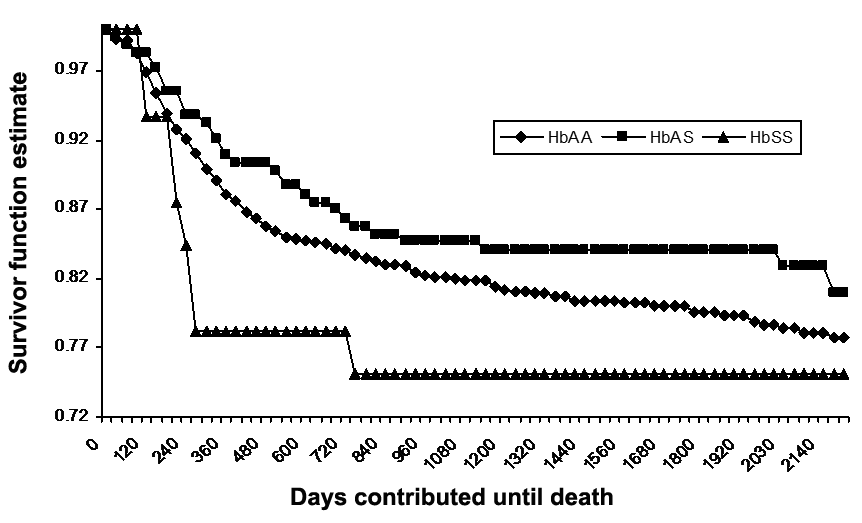
Survival curves of Luo children in an area of Kenya where malaria transmission is intense. HbAS: Heterozygous sickle-cell hemoglobin; HbAA: normal hemoglobin; HbSS: homozygous sickle-cell hemoglobin.

Detailed study of a cohort of 1022 Kenyan children living near Lake Victoria, published in 2002, confirmed this prediction. Many SS children still died before they attained one year of age. Between 2 and 16 months the mortality in AS children was found to be significantly lower than that in AA children. This well-controlled investigation shows the ongoing action of natural selection through disease in a human population.

Analysis of genome wide association (GWA) and fine-resolution association mapping is a powerful method for establishing the inheritance of resistance to infections and other diseases. Two independent preliminary analyses of GWA association with severe falciparum malaria in Africans have been carried out, one by the Malariagen Consortium in a Gambian population and the other by Rolf Horstmann (Bernhard Nocht Institute for Tropical Medicine, Hamburg) and his colleagues on a Ghanaian population. In both cases the only signal of association reaching genome-wide significance was with the HBB locus encoding the β-chain of hemoglobin, which is abnormal in HbS. This does not imply that HbS is the only gene conferring innate resistance to falciparum malaria; there could be many such genes exerting more modest effects that are challenging to detect by GWA because of the low levels of linkage disequilibrium in African populations. However, the same GWA association in two populations is powerful evidence that the single gene conferring strongest innate resistance to falciparum malaria is that encoding HbS.

=== Fitnesses of different genotypes ===
The fitnesses of different genotypes in an African region where there is intense malarial selection were estimated by Anthony Allison in 1954. In the Baamba population living in the Semliki Forest region in Western Uganda the sickle-cell heterozygote (AS) frequency is 40%, which means that the frequency of the sickle-cell gene is 0.255 and 6.5% of children born are SS homozygotes. (Note: If the frequency of the heterozygote is 0.40 the sickle-cell gene frequency (q) can be calculated from the Hardy-Weinberg equation 2q(1-q) = 0,40, whence q = 0.255 and q^{2}, the frequency of sickle-cell homozygotes, is 0.065.) It is a reasonable assumption that until modern treatment was available three-quarters of the SS homozygotes failed to reproduce. To balance this loss of sickle-cell genes, a mutation rate of 1:10.2 per gene per generation would be necessary. This is about 1000 times greater than mutation rates measured in Drosophila and other organisms and much higher than recorded for the sickle-cell locus in Africans. To balance the polymorphism, Anthony Allison estimated that the fitness of the AS heterozygote would have to be 1.26 times than that of the normal homozygote. Later analyses of survival figures have given similar results, with some differences from site to site. In Gambians, it was estimated that AS heterozygotes have 90% protection against P. falciparum-associated severe anemia and cerebral malaria, whereas in the Luo population of Kenya it was estimated that AS heterozygotes have 60% protection against severe malarial anemia. These differences reflect the intensity of transmission of P. falciparum malaria from locality to locality and season to season, so fitness calculations will also vary. In many African populations the AS frequency is about 20%, and a fitness superiority over those with normal hemoglobin of the order of 10% is sufficient to produce a stable polymorphism.

== Glossary ==
- actin, ankrin, spectrin – proteins that are the major components of the cytoskeleton scaffolding within a cell's cytoplasm
- aerobic – uses oxygen for the production of energy (contrast anaerobic)
- allele – one of two or more alternative forms of a gene that arise by mutation
- α-chain / β-chain (hemoglobin) – subcomponents of the hemoglobin molecule; two α-chains and two β-chains make up normal hemoglobin (HbA)
- alveolar – pertaining to the alveoli, the tiny air sacs in the lungs
- amino acid – any of twenty organic compounds that are subunits of protein in the human body
- anabolic – of or relating to the synthesis of complex molecules in living organisms from simpler ones
- together with the storage of energy; constructive metabolism (contrast catabolic)
- anaerobic – refers to a process or reaction which does not require oxygen, but produces energy by other means (contrast aerobic)
- anion transporter (organic) – molecules that play an essential role in the distribution and excretion of numerous endogenous metabolic products and exogenous organic anions
- antigen – any substance (as an immunogen or a hapten) foreign to the body that evokes an immune response either alone or after forming a complex with a larger molecule (as a protein) and that is capable of binding with a component (as an antibody or T cell) of the immune system
- ATP – (Adenosine triphosphate) – an organic molecule containing high energy phosphate bonds used to transport energy within a cell
- catabolic – of or relatig to the breakdown of complex molecules in living organisms to form simpler ones, together with the release of energy; destructive metabolism (contrast anabolic)
- chemokine – are a family of small cytokines, or signaling proteins secreted by cells
- codon – a sequence of three nucleotides which specify which amino acid will be added next during protein synthesis
- corpuscle – obsolete name for red blood cell
- cytoadherance – infected red blood cells may adhere to blood vellel walls and uninfected red blood cells
- cytoplasm – clear jelly-like substance, mostly water, inside a cell
- diathesis – a tendency to suffer from a particular medical condition
- DNA – deoxyribonucleic acid, the hereditary material of the genome
- Drosophila – a kind of fruit fly used for genetic experimentation because of ease of reproduction and manipulation of its genome
- endocytic – the transport of solid matter or liquid into a cell by means of a coated vacuole or vesicle
- endogamy – the custom of marrying only within the limits of a local community, clan, or tribe
- endothelial – of or referring to the thin inner surface of blood vessels
- enzyme – a protein that promotes a cellular process, much like a catalyst in an ordinary chemical reaction
- epidemiology – the study of the spread of disease within a population
- erythrocyte – red blood cell, which with the leucocytes make up the cellular content of the blood (contrast leucocyte)
- erythroid – of or referring to erythrocytes, red blood cells
- fitness (genetic) – loosely, reproductive success that tends to propagate a trait or traits (see natural selection)
- genome – (abstractly) all the inheritable traits of an organism; represented by its chromosomes
- genotype – the genetic makeup of a cell, an organism, or an individual usually with reference to a specific trait
- glycolysis – the breakdown of glucose by enzymes, releasing energy
- glycophorin – transmembrane proteins of red blood cells
- haplotype – a set of DNA variations, or polymorphisms, that tend to be inherited together.
- Hb (HbC, HbE, HbS, etc.) hemoglobin (hemoglobin polymorphisms: hemoglobin type C, hemoglobin type E,
- hemoglobin type S)
- hematopoietic (stem cell) – the blood stem cells that give rise to all other blood cells
- heme oxygenase-1 (HO-1) – an enzyme that breaks down heme, the iron-containing non-protein part of hemoglobin
- hemoglobin – iron based organic molecule in red blood cells that transports oxygen and gives blood its red color
- hemolysis – the rupturing of red blood cells and the release of their contents (cytoplasm) into surrounding fluid (e.g., blood plasma)
- heterozygous – possessing only one copy of a gene for a particular trait
- homozygous – possessing two identical copies of a gene for a particular trait, one from each parent
- hypotonic – denotes a solution of lower osmotic pressure than another solution with which it is in contact, so that certain molecules will migrate from the region of higher osmotic pressure to the region of lower osmotic pressure, until the pressures are equalized
- in vitro – in a test tube or other laboratory vessel; usually used in regard to a testing protocol
- in vivo – in a live human (or animal); usually used in regard to a testing protocol
- leucocyte – white blood cell, part of the immune system, which together with red blood cells, comprise the cellular component of the blood (contrast erythrocyte)
- ligand – an extracellular signal molecule, which when it binds to a cellular receptor, causes a response by the cell
- locus (gene or chromosome) – the specific location of a gene or DNA sequence or position on a chromosome
- macrophage – a large white blood cell, part of the immune system that ingests foreign particles and infectious microorganisms
- major histocompatibility complex (MHC) – proteins found on the surfaces of cells that help the immune system recognize foreign substances; also called the human leucocyte antigen (HLA) system
- micro-RNA – a cellular RNA fragment that prevents the production of a particular protein by binding to and destroying the messenger RNA that would have produced the protein.
- microvasculature – very small blood vessels
- mitochondria – energy producing organelles of a cell
- mutation – a spontaneous change to a gene, arising from an error in replication of DNA; usually mutations are referred to in the context of inherited mutations, i.e. changes to the gametes
- natural selection – the gradual process by which biological traits become either more or less common in a population as a function of the effect of inherited traits on the differential reproductive success of organisms interacting with their environment (closely related to fitness)
- nucleotide – organic molecules that are subunits, of nucleic acids like DNA and RNA
- nucleic acid – a complex organic molecule present in living cells, esp. DNA or RNA, which consist of many nucleotides linked in a long chain.
- oxygen radical – a highly reactive ion containing oxygen, capable of damaging microorganisms and normal tissues.
- pathogenesis – the manner of development of a disease
- PCR – Polymerase Chain Reaction, an enzymatic reaction by which DNA is replicated in a test tube for subsequent testing or analysis
- phenotype – the composite of an organism's observable characteristics or traits, such as its morphology
- Plasmodium – the general type (genus) of the protozoan microorganisms that cause malaria, though only a few of them do
- polymerize – to combine replicated subunits into a longer molecule (usually referring to synthetic materials, but also organic molecules)
- polymorphism – the occurrence of something in several different forms, as for example hemoglobin (HbA, HbC, etc.)
- polypeptide – a chain of amino acids forming part of a protein molecule
- receptor (cellular surface) – specialized integral membrane proteins that take part in communication between the cell and the outside world; receptors are responsive to specific ligands that attach to them.
- reducing environment (cellular) – reducing environment is one where oxidation is prevented by removal of oxygen and other oxidising gases or vapours, and which may contain actively reducing gases such as hydrogen, carbon monoxide and gases that would oxidize in the presence of oxygen, such as hydrogen sulfide.
- RNA – ribonucleic acid, a nucleic acid present in all living cells. Its principal role is to act as a messenger carrying instructions from DNA for controlling the synthesis of proteins
- sequestration (biology) – process by which an organism accumulates a compound or tissue (as red blood cells) from the environment
- sex-linked – a trait associated with a gene that is carried only by the male or female parent (contrast with autosomal)
- Sporozoa – a large class of strictly parasitic nonmotile protozoans, including Plasmodia which cause malaria
- TCA cycle – TriCarboxylic Acid cycle is a series of enzyme-catalyzed chemical reactions that form a key part of aerobic respiration in cells
- translocation (cellular biology) – movement of molecules from outside to inside (or vice versa) of a cell
- transmembrane – existing or occurring across a cell membrane
- venous – of or referring to the veins
- vesicle – a small organelle within a cell, consisting of fluid enclosed by a fatty membrane
- virulence factors – enable an infectious agent to replicate and disseminate within a host in part by subverting or eluding host defenses.

== See also ==
- Adaptive immunity
- Malaria vaccine
