= Spectrin repeat =

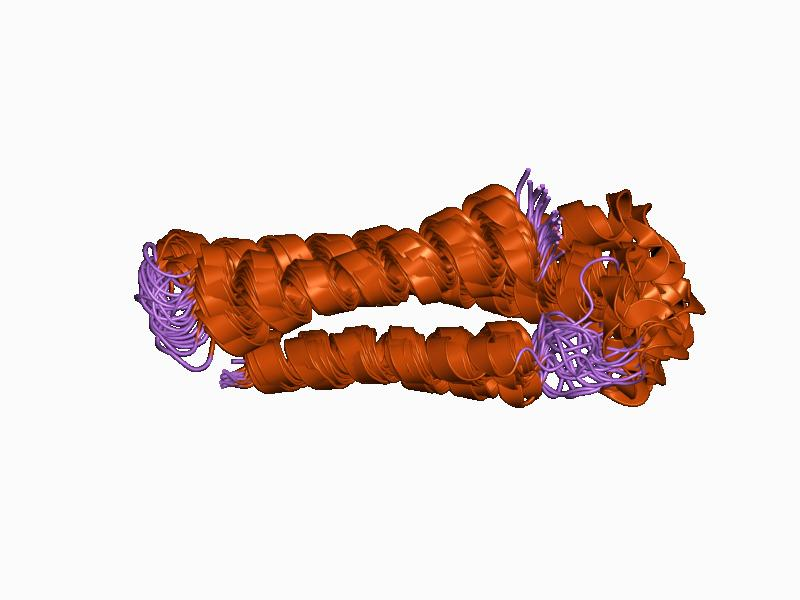
- Structure of the spectrin repeat: a left-handed antiparallel triple-helical coiled-coil.

Identifiers
- Symbol: Spectrin
- Pfam: PF00435
- Pfam clan: CL0743
- ECOD: 604.1.1
- InterPro: IPR002017
- PROSITE: PDOC50083
- SCOP2: 1aj3 / SCOPe / SUPFAM
- CDD: cd00176
Available protein structures:
- PDB: IPR002017 PF00435 (ECOD; PDBsum)
- AlphaFold: IPR002017; PF00435

Spectrin repeats are found in several proteins involved in cytoskeletal structure. These include spectrin, alpha-actinin, dystrophin and more recently the plakin family. The spectrin repeat forms a three-helix bundle. These conform to the rules of the heptad repeat. Spectrin repeats give rise to linear proteins. This however may be due to sample bias in which linear and rigid structures are more amenable to crystallization. There are hints however, that some proteins harbouring spectrin repeats may also be flexible. This is most likely due to specifically evolved functional purposes.

== Human proteins containing this domain ==
ACTN1; ACTN2; ACTN3; ACTN4; AKAP6; SYNE3; CATX-15; DMD; DRP2; DST; KALRN; MACF1; MCF2L; SPTA1; SPTAN1; SPTB; SPTBN1; SPTBN2; SPTBN4; SPTBN5; SYNE1; SYNE2; TRIO; UTRN;
