= Spectrin =

Cytoskeletal protein

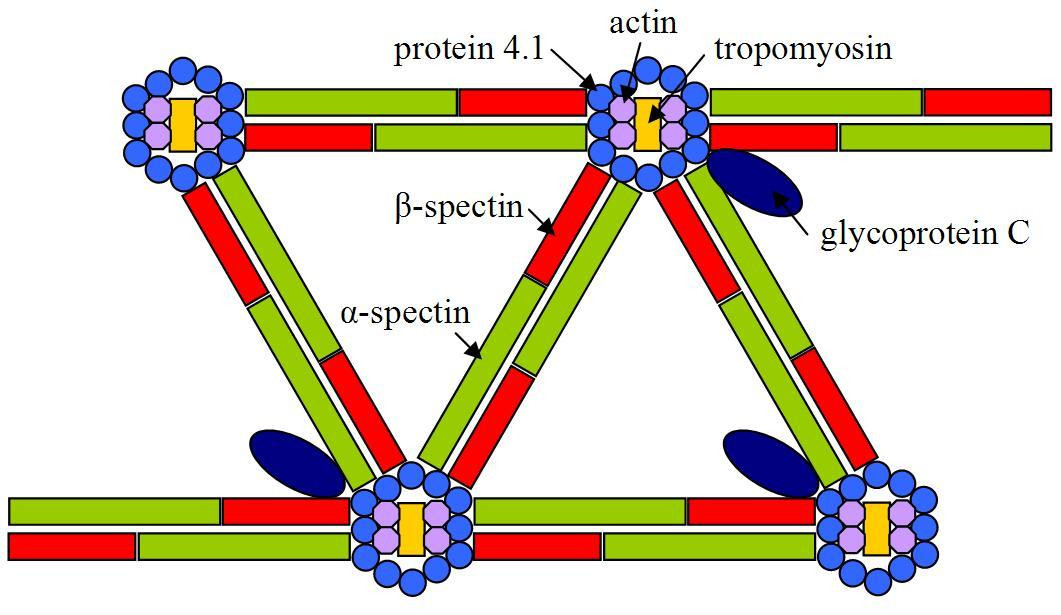
A schematic diagram of spectrin and other cytoskeletal molecules

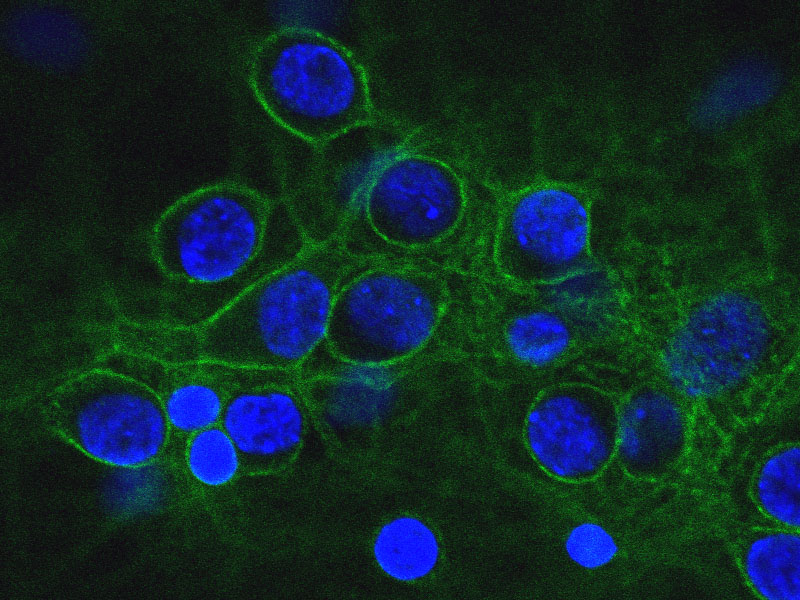
Localization of alpha-II spectrin in green under the plasma membrane of rat neurons in tissue culture as shown with confocal microscopy and immunofluorescence. The nuclei of the cells is revealed in blue by the DNA dye DAPI.

Spectrin is a cytoskeletal protein that lines the intracellular side of the plasma membrane in many eukaryotic cells, including animal cells but not in plant cells or yeast. Spectrin forms pentagonal or hexagonal arrangements, forming a scaffold and playing an important role in maintenance of plasma membrane integrity and cytoskeletal structure. The hexagonal arrangements are formed by tetramers of spectrin subunits associating with short actin filaments at either end of the tetramer. These short actin filaments act as junctional complexes allowing the formation of the hexagonal mesh. The protein is named spectrin since it was first isolated as a major protein component of human red blood cells which had been treated with mild detergents; the detergents lysed the cells and the hemoglobin and other cytoplasmic components were washed out. In the light microscope the basic shape of the red blood cell could still be seen as the spectrin-containing submembranous cytoskeleton preserved the shape of the cell in outline. This became known as a red blood cell "ghost" (spectre), and so the major protein of the ghost was named spectrin.

In certain types of brain injury such as diffuse axonal injury, spectrin is irreversibly cleaved by the proteolytic enzyme calpain, destroying the cytoskeleton. Spectrin cleavage causes the membrane to form blebs and ultimately to be degraded, usually leading to the death of the cell. Spectrin subunits may also be cleaved by caspase family enzymes, and calpain and caspase produce different spectrin breakdown products which can be detected by western blotting with appropriate antibodies. Calpain cleavage may indicate activation of necrosis, while caspase cleavage may indicate apoptosis.

== In erythrocytes ==
The convenience of using erythrocytes compared to other cell types means they have become the standard model for the investigation of the spectrin cytoskeleton. Dimeric spectrin is formed by the lateral association of αI and βI monomers to form a dimer. Dimers then associate in a head-to-head formation to produce the tetramer. End-to-end association of these tetramers with short actin filaments produces the hexagonal complexes observed.

In humans, association with the intracellular face of the plasma membrane is by indirect interaction, through direct interactions with protein 4.1 and ankyrin, with the transmembrane ion transporter band 3 Protein 4.2 binds the spectrin tail region to the transmembrane protein glycophorin A. In animals, spectrin forms the meshwork that provides red blood cells their shape.

The erythrocyte model demonstrates the importance of the spectrin cytoskeleton in that mutations in spectrin commonly cause hereditary defects of the erythrocyte, including hereditary elliptocytosis and rarely hereditary spherocytosis.

== In invertebrates ==
There are three spectrins in invertebrates, α, β and β_{H}. Mutations in β_{H} spectrin in Caenorhabditis elegans cause defects in morphogenesis resulting in a significantly shorter, but otherwise mostly normal, animal that moves and reproduces. These animals are called "sma" for their small phenotype and carry mutations in the C. elegans sma-1 gene. A mutation in β spectrin in C. elegans results in an uncoordinated phenotype in which the worms are paralysed and much shorter than wild-type. In addition to the morphological effects, the Unc-70 mutation also produce defective neurons. Neuron numbers are normal but neuronal outgrowth was defective.

Similarly, spectrin plays a role in Drosophila neurons. Knock-out of α or β spectrin in D. melanogaster results in neurons that are morphologically normal but have reduced neurotransmission at the neuromuscular junction. In animals, spectrin forms the meshwork that provides red blood cells their shape.

== In vertebrates ==
=== Vertebrate spectrin genes ===
The spectrin gene family has undergone expansion during evolution. Rather than the one α and two β genes in invertebrates, there are two α spectrins (αI and αII) and five β spectrins (βI to V), named in the order of discovery.

In humans, the genes are:

- Alpha: SPTA1, SPTAN1
- Beta: SPTB, SPTBN1, SPTBN2, SPTBN4, SPTBN5

The production of spectrin is promoted by the transcription factor GATA1.

=== Role in muscle tissue ===
Some evidence for the role of spectrins in muscle tissues exist. In myocardial cells, aII spectrin distribution is coincident with Z-discs and the plasma membrane of myofibrils. Additionally, mice with an ankyrin (ankB) knock-out have disrupted calcium homeostasis in the myocardial. Affected mice have disrupted z-band and sarcomere morphology. In this experimental model ryanodine and IP_{3} receptors have abnormal distribution in cultured myocytes. The calcium signaling of the cultured cells is disrupted. In humans, a mutation within the AnkB gene results in the long QT syndrome and sudden death, strengthening the evidence for a role for the spectrin cytoskeleton in excitable tissue.

== See also ==
- Proteopedia 2fot the complex between calmodulin and alpha11spectrin
- Spectrin repeat
- Glycophorin C, helps anchor spectrin-actin cytoskeleton to cell membrane in erythrocytes
