= SPTBN5 =

Protein-coding gene in the species Homo sapiens

Identifiers
- Aliases: SPTBN5, BSPECV, HUBSPECV, HUSPECV, spectrin beta, non-erythrocytic 5
- External IDs: OMIM: 605916; MGI: 2685200; GeneCards: SPTBN5

Gene location (Human)
Chr.	Chromosome 15 (human)
Band	15q15.1	Start	41,848,146 bp
Band	15q15.1	End	41,894,053 bp

Gene location (Mouse)
Chr.	Chromosome 2 (mouse)
Band	2|2 E5	Start	119,871,974 bp
Band	2|2 E5	End	119,916,159 bp
RNA expression pattern
Bgee	Human / Mouse (ortholog); Top expressed in: sural nerve; cerebellar hemisphere; right hemisphere of cerebellum; testicle; apex of heart; retinal pigment epithelium; skin of abdomen; granulocyte; left ventricle; right lobe of thyroid gland / Top expressed in: esophagus; muscle of thigh; hypothalamus; muscle tissue; skeletal muscle tissue; quadriceps femoris muscle; lip; striatum of neuraxis; zone of skin; islet of Langerhans; More reference expression data
BioGPS	n/a
Gene ontology
Molecular function	dynactin binding; protein self-association; kinesin binding; myosin tail binding; actin binding; dynein intermediate chain binding; spectrin binding
Cellular component	cytoplasm; cytosol; spectrin; membrane; photoreceptor connecting cilium; photoreceptor disc membrane; cytoskeleton; microtubule organizing center; filamentous actin
Biological process	Golgi organization; MAPK cascade; axon guidance; endoplasmic reticulum to Golgi vesicle-mediated transport; actin filament capping; lysosomal transport; protein homooligomerization; actin cytoskeleton organization
Sources:Amigo / QuickGO
Orthologs
Databases	NCBI: entry; OMA: entry
Species	Human	Mouse
Entrez	51332	640524
Ensembl	ENSG00000137877	ENSMUSG00000074899
UniProt	Q9NRC6	n/a
RefSeq (mRNA)	NM_016642	NM_001370938
RefSeq (protein)	NP_057726	n/a
Location (UCSC)	Chr 15: 41.85 – 41.89 Mb	Chr 2: 119.87 – 119.92 Mb
PubMed search
- Wikidata
View/Edit Human	View/Edit Mouse

Spectrin, beta, non-erythrocytic 5 also known as SPTBN5 is a protein that in humans is encoded by the SPTBN5 gene. SPTBN5 belongs to the spectrin family of cytoskeletal proteins.

== Structure and function ==
SPTBN5 contains the following domains:

- actin-binding domain
- membrane-association domain-1
- self-association domain
- C-terminal pleckstrin homology domain.

Based on these structural features it is thought that SPTBN5 is likely to form heterodimers and oligomers with alpha-spectrin and to interact directly with cellular membranes.

SPTBN5 is highly expressed in embryoid bodies.
