= Hereditary pyropoikilocytosis =

- Other names: Pyropoikilocytosis hereditary
- Hereditary pyropoikilocytosis is autosomal recessive
- Specialty: Hematology

Hereditary pyropoikilocytosis (HPP) is an autosomal recessive form of hemolytic anemia characterized by an abnormal sensitivity of red blood cells to heat and erythrocyte morphology similar to that seen in thermal burns or from prolonged exposure of a healthy patient's blood sample to high ambient temperatures. Patients with HPP tend to experience severe hemolysis and anemia in infancy that gradually improves, evolving toward typical elliptocytosis later in life. However, the hemolysis can lead to rapid sequestration and destruction of red cells. Splenectomy is curative when this occurs.

HPP has been associated with a defect of the erythrocyte membrane protein spectrin and with spectrin deficiency. It was characterized in 1975. It is considered a severe form of hereditary elliptocytosis.

== Causes ==
Mutations of the alphaspectrin gene causes this disease. HPP can be considered as a subset of hereditary elliptocytosis.

== Diagnosis ==
Genetic testing for the presence of mutations in protein molecules is considered to be a confirmatory testing technique. It is important to know the risks regarding the transmission and dangers of HPP.

== Treatment ==
Splenectomy is a possible treatment

== See also ==
- Erythrocyte
- Poikilocytosis
- List of hematologic conditions
