= Protein 4.1 =

Protein found in humans

EPB41
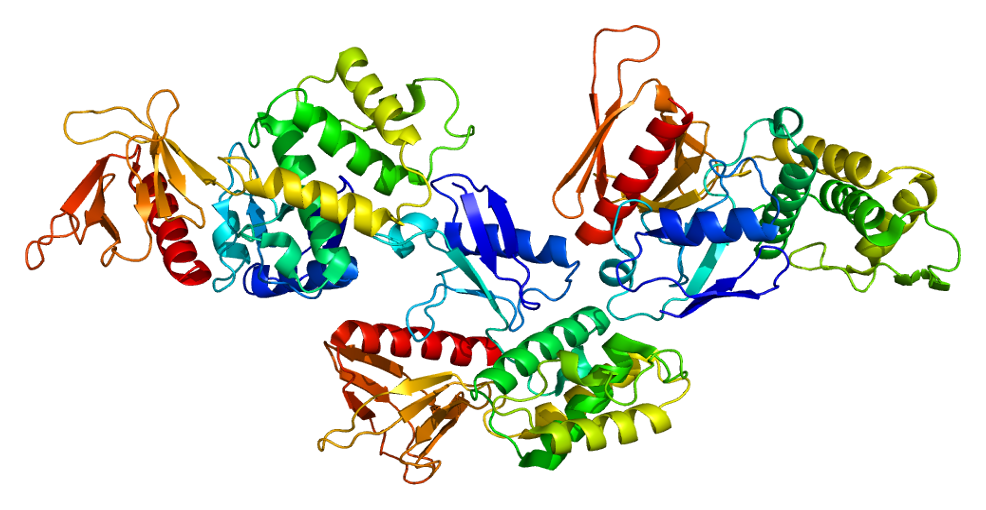

Identifiers
- Aliases: EPB41, erythrocyte membrane protein band 4.1, 4.1R, EL1, HE
- External IDs: OMIM: 130500; MGI: 95401; GeneCards: EPB41
Available structures
PDB	Ortholog search: PDBe RCSB
PDB	List of PDB id codes 1GG3, 2RQ1, 3QIJ

Gene location (Human)
Chr.	Chromosome 1 (human)
Band	1p35.3	Start	28,887,091 bp
Band	1p35.3	End	29,120,046 bp

Gene location (Mouse)
Chr.	Chromosome 4 (mouse)
Band	4 D2.3|4 64.54 cM	Start	131,923,413 bp
Band	4 D2.3|4 64.54 cM	End	132,075,321 bp
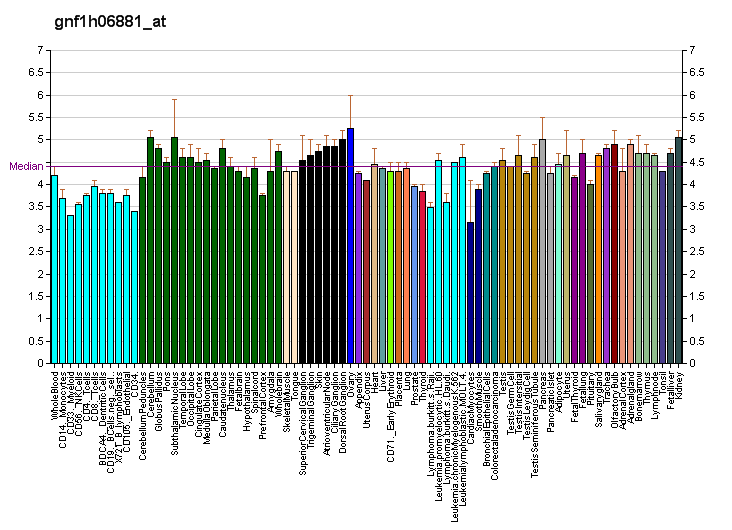

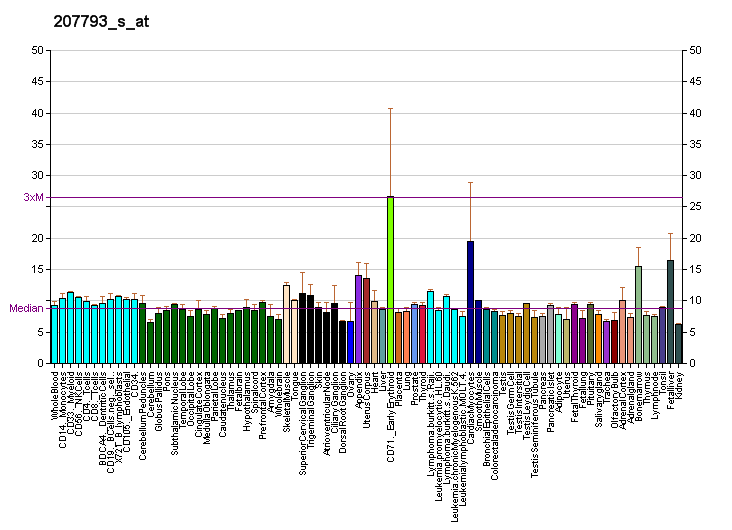

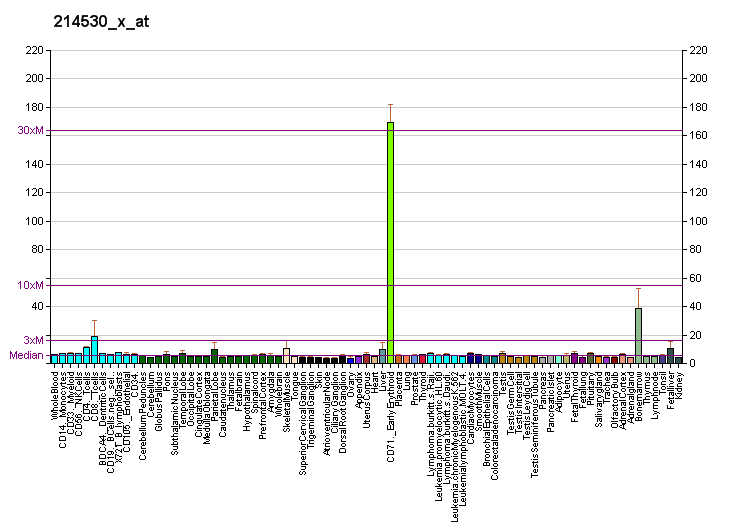
RNA expression pattern
Bgee	Human / Mouse (ortholog); Top expressed in: trabecular bone; cerebellar hemisphere; right hemisphere of cerebellum; epithelium of colon; tonsil; blood; amniotic fluid; epithelium of nasopharynx; monocyte; bone marrow / Top expressed in: blood; neural layer of retina; genital tubercle; tail of embryo; tibiofemoral joint; fetal liver hematopoietic progenitor cell; zygote; ventricular zone; cerebellar cortex; lens; More reference expression data
BioGPS	More reference expression data
Gene ontology
Molecular function	spectrin binding; structural molecule activity; calmodulin binding; cytoskeletal protein binding; 1-phosphatidylinositol binding; structural constituent of cytoskeleton; protein binding; actin binding; protein C-terminus binding; protein N-terminus binding; phosphoprotein binding
Cellular component	membrane; cortical cytoskeleton; cell junction; cell cortex; spectrin-associated cytoskeleton; cytoskeleton; nucleus; cytoplasm; cytosol; cytoplasmic side of plasma membrane; postsynaptic density; plasma membrane; cell cortex region; protein-containing complex; basolateral plasma membrane
Biological process	positive regulation of protein binding; cortical actin cytoskeleton organization; actin cytoskeleton organization; actomyosin structure organization; regulation of cell shape; positive regulation of protein localization to cell cortex; cell cycle; cell division; protein-containing complex assembly; regulation of calcium ion transport; regulation of intestinal absorption
Sources:Amigo / QuickGO
Orthologs
Databases	NCBI: entry; OMA: entry
Species	Human	Mouse
Entrez	2035	269587
Ensembl	ENSG00000159023	ENSMUSG00000028906
UniProt	P11171	P48193
RefSeq (mRNA)	NM_001166005; NM_001166006; NM_001166007; NM_004437; NM_203342 NM_203343; NM_001376013; NM_001376014; NM_001376015; NM_001376016; NM_001376017; NM_001376018; NM_001376019; NM_001376020; NM_001376021; NM_001376022; NM_001376023; NM_001376024; NM_001376025; NM_001376026; NM_001376027; NM_001376028	NM_001128606; NM_001128607; NM_183428
RefSeq (protein)	NP_001159477; NP_001159478; NP_001159479; NP_004428; NP_976217 NP_976218; NP_001362942; NP_001362943; NP_001362944; NP_001362945; NP_001362946; NP_001362947; NP_001362948; NP_001362949; NP_001362950; NP_001362951; NP_001362952; NP_001362953; NP_001362954; NP_001362955; NP_001362956; NP_001362957	NP_001122078; NP_001122079; NP_906273
Location (UCSC)	Chr 1: 28.89 – 29.12 Mb	Chr 4: 131.92 – 132.08 Mb
PubMed search
- Wikidata
View/Edit Human	View/Edit Mouse

Protein 4.1, (Erythrocyte membrane protein band 4.1) is a protein associated with the cytoskeleton that in humans is encoded by the EPB41 gene. Protein 4.1 is a major structural element of the erythrocyte membrane skeleton. It plays a key role in regulating membrane physical properties of mechanical stability and deformability by stabilizing spectrin-actin interaction. Protein 4.1 (80 kD) interacts with spectrin and short actin filaments to form the erythrocyte membrane skeleton. Mutations of spectrin and protein 4.1 are associated with elliptocytosis or spherocytosis and anemia of varying severity.

== Clinical significance ==
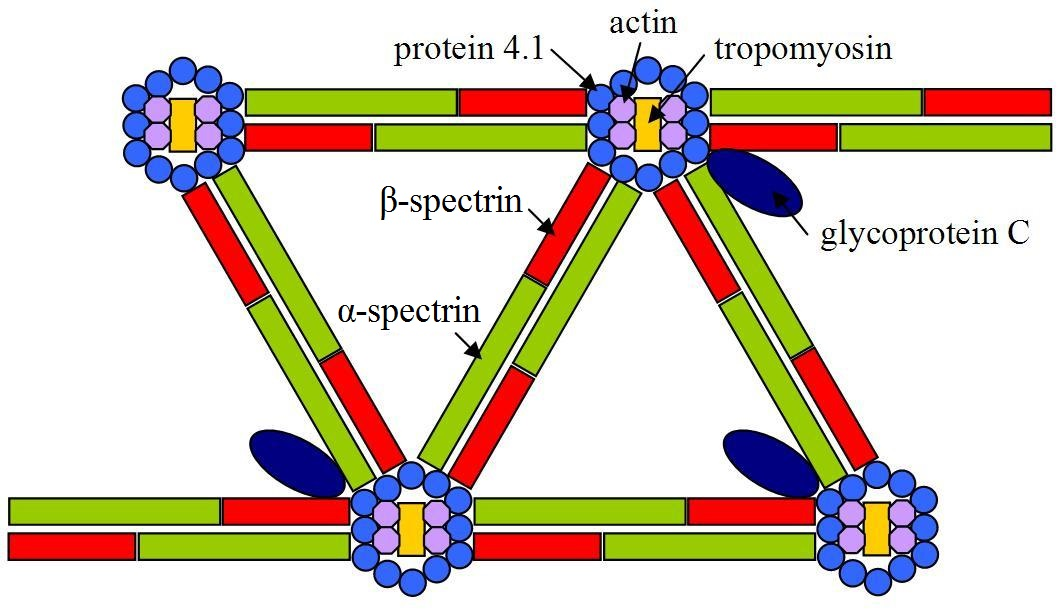
A schematic diagram representing the relationships between cytoskeletal molecules as relevant to hereditary elliptocytosis

Elliptocytosis is a hematologic disorder characterized by elliptically shaped erythrocytes and a variable degree of hemolytic anemia. Inherited as an autosomal dominant, elliptocytosis results from mutation in any one of several genes encoding proteins of the red cell membrane skeleton. The form discussed here is the one found in the 1950s to be linked to Rh blood group and more recently shown to be caused by a defect in protein 4.1. 'Rh-unlinked' forms of elliptocytosis are caused by mutation in the alpha-spectrin gene (MIM 182860), the beta-spectrin gene (MIM 182870), or the band 3 gene (MIM 109270) [supplied by OMIM].

== Interactions ==
Protein 4.1 has been shown to interact with:

- CENPJ,
- EIF3G
- NUMA1, and
- TJP2.

== See also ==
- Elliptocytosis
