= AMMECR1 =

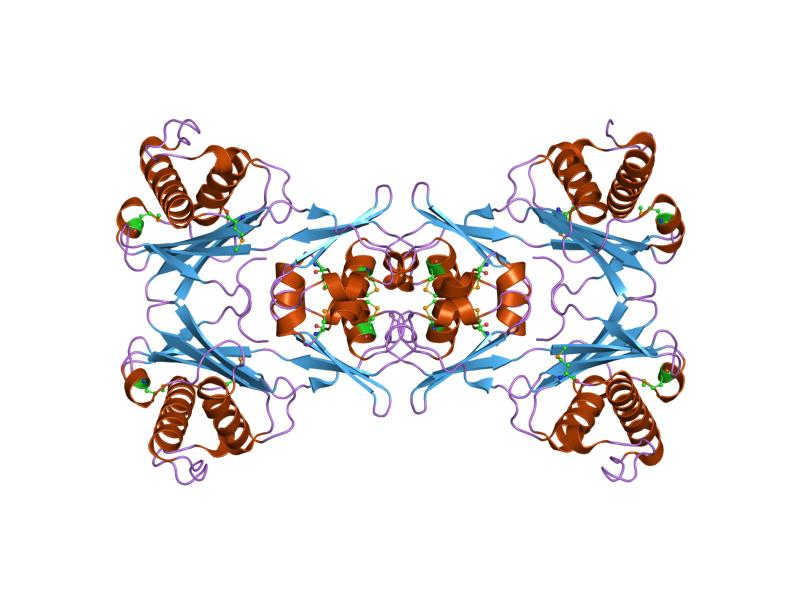
- X-ray crystal structure of protein q8pzk8 from methanosarcina mazei. northeast structural genomics consortium target mar9.

Identifiers
- Aliases: AMMECR1, AMMERC1, Alport syndrome, mental retardation, midface hypoplasia and elliptocytosis chromosomal region gene 1, MFHIEN, AMMECR nuclear protein 1
- External IDs: OMIM: 300195; MGI: 1860206; GeneCards: AMMECR1

Gene location (Human)
Chr.	X chromosome (human)
Band	Xq23	Start	110,194,186 bp
Band	Xq23	End	110,440,318 bp

Gene location (Mouse)
Chr.	X chromosome (mouse)
Band	X|X F2	Start	141,634,142 bp
Band	X|X F2	End	141,749,724 bp
RNA expression pattern
Bgee	Human / Mouse (ortholog); Top expressed in: buccal mucosa cell; trabecular bone; gingival epithelium; human penis; germinal epithelium; amniotic fluid; vulva; nipple; skin of thigh; oral cavity / Top expressed in: hair follicle; conjunctival fornix; Rostral migratory stream; aortic valve; esophagus; lip; tail of embryo; granulocyte; ascending aorta; epiblast; More reference expression data
BioGPS	n/a
Gene ontology
Molecular function	protein binding
Cellular component	nucleus
Biological process	biological process
Sources:Amigo / QuickGO
Orthologs
Databases	NCBI: entry; OMA: entry
Species	Human	Mouse
Entrez	9949	56068
Ensembl	ENSG00000101935	ENSMUSG00000042225
UniProt	Q9Y4X0	Q9JHT5
RefSeq (mRNA)	NM_015365; NM_001025580; NM_001171689	NM_019496
RefSeq (protein)	NP_001020751; NP_001165160; NP_056180	NP_062369
Location (UCSC)	Chr X: 110.19 – 110.44 Mb	Chr X: 141.63 – 141.75 Mb
PubMed search
- Wikidata
View/Edit Human	View/Edit Mouse

AMMECR1 domain

Identifiers
- Symbol: AMMECR1
- Pfam: PF01871
- InterPro: IPR002733
Available protein structures:
- PDB: IPR002733 PF01871 (ECOD; PDBsum)
- AlphaFold: IPR002733; PF01871

In molecular biology, the AMMECR1 protein (Alport syndrome, intellectual disability, midface hypoplasia and elliptocytosis chromosomal region gene 1 protein) is a protein encoded by the AMMECR1 gene on human chromosome Xq22.3.

The contiguous gene deletion syndrome is characterised by Alport syndrome (A), intellectual disability (M), midface hypoplasia (M), and elliptocytosis (E), as well as generalized hypoplasia and cardiac abnormalities. It is caused by a deletion in Xq22.3, comprising several genes including AMME chromosomal region gene 1 (AMMECR1), which encodes a protein with a nuclear location and presently unknown function. The C-terminal region of AMMECR1 (from residue 122 to 333) is well conserved, and homologues appear in species ranging from bacteria and archaea to eukaryotes. The high level of conservation of the AMMECR1 domain points to a basic cellular function, potentially in either the transcription, replication, repair or translation machinery.

The AMMECR1 domain contains a six-amino-acid motif (LRGCIG) that might be functionally important since it is strikingly conserved throughout evolution. The AMMECR1 domain consists of two distinct subdomains of different sizes. The large subdomain, which contains both the N- and C-terminal regions, consists of five alpha-helices and five beta-strands. These five beta-strands form an antiparallel beta-sheet. The small subdomain consists of four alpha-helices and three beta-strands, and these beta-strands also form an antiparallel beta-sheet. The conserved 'LRGCIG' motif is located at beta(2) and its N-terminal loop, and most of the side chains of these residues point toward the interface of the two subdomains. The two subdomains are connected by only two loops, and the interaction between the two subdomains is not strong. Thus, these subdomains may move dynamically when the substrate enters the cleft. The size of the cleft suggests that the substrate is large, e.g., the substrate may be a nucleic acid or protein. However, the inner side of the cleft is not filled with positively charged residues, and therefore it is unlikely that negatively charged nucleic acids such as DNA or RNA interact at this site.
