= EPB42 =

Protein-coding gene in the species Homo sapiens

An Error has occurred retrieving Wikidata item for infobox Erythrocyte membrane protein band 4.20 is a protein that in humans is encoded by the EPB42 gene. It is part of the red blood cell cytoskeleton.

Erythrocyte membrane protein band 4.2 is an ATP-binding protein which may regulate the association of band 3 with ankyrin. It probably has a role in erythrocyte shape and mechanical property regulation. Mutations in the EPB42 gene are associated with recessive spherocytic elliptocytosis and recessively transmitted hereditary hemolytic anemia.

== See also ==
- Hereditary elliptocytosis
