= Southeast Asian ovalocytosis =

- Specialty: Hematology

Southeast Asian ovalocytosis is a blood disorder that is similar to, but distinct from hereditary elliptocytosis. It is common in some communities in Malaysia and Papua New Guinea, as it confers some resistance to cerebral Falciparum Malaria.

== Pathophysiology ==
=== Southeast Asian ovalocytosis ===
It is hereditary hemolytic anaemia in which the red blood cell is oval-shaped. The primary defect in SAO differs significantly from other forms of elliptocytosis in that it is a defect in the gene coding for a protein that is not directly involved in the cytoskeleton scaffolding of the cell. Rather, the defect lies in a protein known as the band 3 protein, which lies in the cell membrane itself. The band 3 protein normally binds to another membrane-bound protein called ankyrin, but in SAO this bond is stronger than normal. Other abnormalities include tighter tethering of the band 3 protein to the cell membrane, increased tyrosine phosphorylation of the band 3 protein, reduced sulfate anion transport through the cell membrane, and more rapid ATP consumption. These (and probably other) consequences of the SAO mutations lead to the following erythrocyte abnormalities:

- A greater robustness of cells to a variety of external forces, including:
  - Reduction in cellular sensitivity to osmotic pressures
  - Reduction in fragility related to temperature change
  - greater general rigidity of the cell membrane
  - Loss of sensitivity to substances that cause spiculation of cells
- Reduced anion exchange
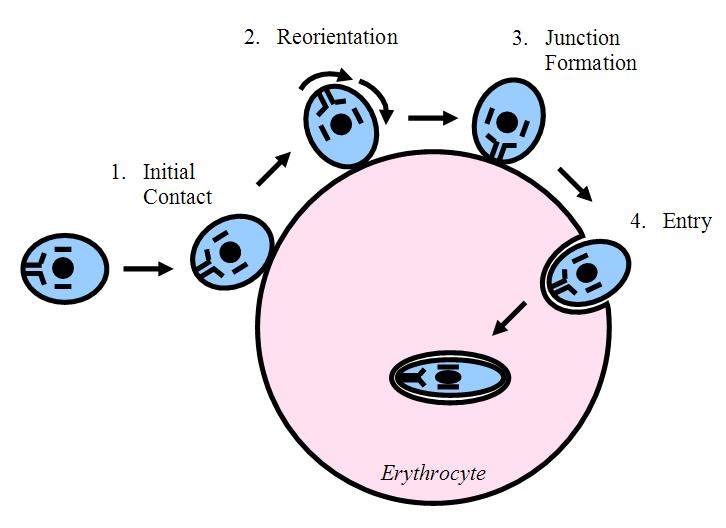
  Figure 3 - A representation of the steps involved in the entry of Plasmodium falciparum into an erythrocyte.
- Partial intracellular depletion of ATP
- A reduction in expression of multiple antigens

These changes are thought to give rise to the scientifically and clinically interesting phenomenon that those with SAO exhibit: a marked in vivo resistance to infection by the causative pathogen of malaria, Plasmodium falciparum. Unlike those with the Leach phenotype of common hereditary elliptocytosis (see above), there is a clinically significant reduction in both disease severity and prevalence of malaria in those with SAO. Because of this, the 35% incidence rate of SAO along the north coast of Madang Province in Papua New Guinea, where malaria in endemic, is a good example of natural selection.

The reasons behind the resistance to malaria become clear when given an explanation the way in which Plasmodium falciparum invades its host. This parasite is an obligate intracellular parasite, which must enter the cells of the host it is invading. The band 3 proteins aggregate on the cell membrane at the site of entry, forming a circular orifice that the parasite squeezes through. These band 3 proteins act as receptors for the parasite. Normally a process much like endocytosis occurs, and the parasite is able to isolate itself from the intracellular proteins that are toxic to it while still being inside an erythrocyte (see figure 2). The increased rigidity of the erythrocyte membrane in SAO is thought to reduce the capacity of the band 3 proteins to cluster together, thereby making it more difficult for the malaria parasite to properly attach to and enter the cell. The reduced free ATP within the cell has been postulated as a further mechanism behind which SAO creates a hostile environment for Plasmodium falciparum.

== Diagnosis ==
Diagnosis is based on presence of ovalocytes on a peripheral blood smear in absence of haemolysis, and should be differentiated from other forms of hereditory elliptocytosis and hereditary spherocytosis. Genetic assays such as PCR amplification may be used to confirm mutation of the SLC4A1 gene.

== Treatment ==
Homozygous SAO appears to be largely incompatible with life, although there have been reports of individuals surviving till adolescence with prompt intervention.Patients with heterozygous SAO are largely asymptomatic or may present with only compensated haemolytic anemia, hence treatment is generally not necessary. Patients with severe haemolytic anemia may require splenectomy.

== See also ==
- Hereditary elliptocytosis
- Sickle-cell disease
- List of hematologic conditions
