= Spectrin, alpha 1 =

Protein found in humans

SPTA1
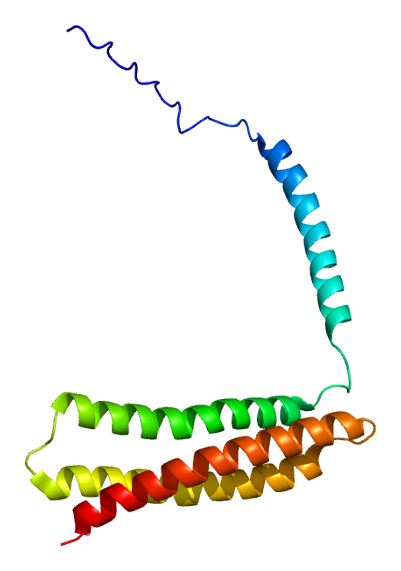

Identifiers
- Aliases: SPTA1, EL2, HPP, HS3, SPH3, SPTA, Spectrin, alpha 1, spectrin alpha, erythrocytic 1
- External IDs: OMIM: 182860; MGI: 98385; GeneCards: SPTA1
Available structures
PDB	Ortholog search: PDBe RCSB
PDB	List of PDB id codes 1OWA, 3LBX

Gene location (Human)
Chr.	Chromosome 1 (human)
Band	1q23.1	Start	158,610,704 bp
Band	1q23.1	End	158,686,715 bp

Gene location (Mouse)
Chr.	Chromosome 1 (mouse)
Band	1 H3|1 80.97 cM	Start	174,000,342 bp
Band	1 H3|1 80.97 cM	End	174,076,016 bp
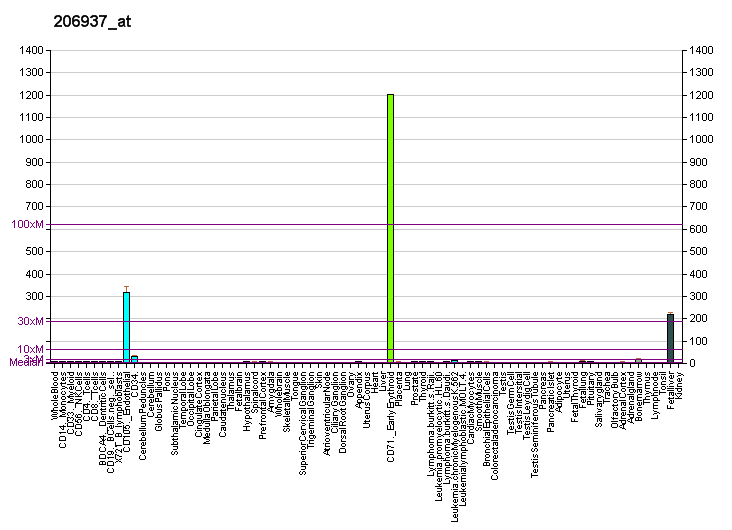
RNA expression pattern
Bgee	Human / Mouse (ortholog); Top expressed in: trabecular bone; bone marrow; bone marrow cell; testicle; gonad; monocyte; blood; right testis; left testis; spleen / Top expressed in: fetal liver hematopoietic progenitor cell; blood; tibiofemoral joint; human fetus; right lobe of liver; body of femur; epithelium of lens; spleen; right ventricle; bone marrow; More reference expression data
BioGPS	More reference expression data
Gene ontology
Molecular function	calcium ion binding; metal ion binding; actin filament binding; structural constituent of cytoskeleton; protein binding; actin binding; protein heterodimerization activity
Cellular component	cytoplasm; cytosol; intrinsic component of the cytoplasmic side of the plasma membrane; cell cortex; actin cytoskeleton; cytoskeleton; spectrin; spectrin-associated cytoskeleton; cytoplasmic side of plasma membrane; membrane; axon; cortical cytoskeleton; cuticular plate
Biological process	actin filament organization; MAPK cascade; axon guidance; endoplasmic reticulum to Golgi vesicle-mediated transport; actin filament capping; regulation of cell shape; lymphocyte homeostasis; porphyrin-containing compound biosynthetic process; plasma membrane organization; actin cytoskeleton organization; hemopoiesis; positive regulation of protein binding; positive regulation of T cell proliferation
Sources:Amigo / QuickGO
Orthologs
Databases	NCBI: entry; OMA: entry
Species	Human	Mouse
Entrez	6708	20739
Ensembl	ENSG00000163554	ENSMUSG00000026532
UniProt	P02549	P08032
RefSeq (mRNA)	NM_003126	NM_011465
RefSeq (protein)	NP_003117	NP_035595
Location (UCSC)	Chr 1: 158.61 – 158.69 Mb	Chr 1: 174 – 174.08 Mb
PubMed search
- Wikidata
View/Edit Human	View/Edit Mouse

Spectrin alpha chain, erythrocyte is a protein that in humans is encoded by the SPTA1 gene.

Spectrin is an actin crosslinking and molecular scaffold protein that links the plasma membrane to the actin cytoskeleton, and functions in the determination of cell shape, arrangement of transmembrane proteins, and organization of organelles. It is a tetramer made up of alpha-beta dimers linked in a head-to-head arrangement. This gene is one member of a family of alpha-spectrin genes. The encoded protein is primarily composed of 22 spectrin repeats which are involved in dimer formation. It forms weaker tetramer interactions than non-erythrocytic alpha spectrin, which may increase the plasma membrane elasticity and deformability of red blood cells. Mutations in this gene result in a variety of hereditary red blood cell disorders, including elliptocytosis type 2, pyropoikilocytosis, and spherocytic hemolytic anemia.

== Interactions ==
Spectrin, alpha 1 has been shown to interact with Abl gene.
