= Anion exchange protein 1 =

Protein found in humans

SLC4A1
- Kidney intercalated cell depicting SLC4A1 (kAE1) at lower left as orange rectangle

Identifiers
- Aliases: SLC4A1, solute carrier family 4 (anion exchanger), member 1 (Diego blood group), AE1, BND3, CD233, DI, EMPB3, EPB3, FR, RTA1A, SW, WD, WD1, WR, CHC, SAO, SPH4, solute carrier family 4 member 1 (Diego blood group)
- External IDs: OMIM: 109270; MGI: 109393; GeneCards: SLC4A1
Available structures
PDB	Ortholog search: PDBe RCSB
PDB	List of PDB id codes 1BH7, 1BNX, 1BTQ, 1BTR, 1BTS, 1BTT, 1BZK, 1HYN, 3BTB, 2BTA, 2BTB, 4KY9, 4YZF

Gene location (Human)
Chr.	Chromosome 17 (human)
Band	17q21.31	Start	44,248,390 bp
Band	17q21.31	End	44,268,141 bp

Gene location (Mouse)
Chr.	Chromosome 11 (mouse)
Band	11 66.29 cM|11 D	Start	102,239,650 bp
Band	11 66.29 cM|11 D	End	102,257,029 bp
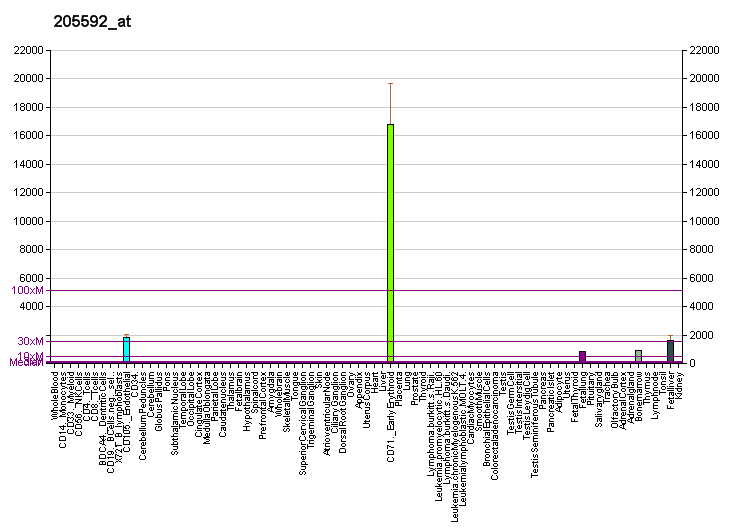
RNA expression pattern
Bgee	Human / Mouse (ortholog); Top expressed in: trabecular bone; bone marrow; bone marrow cell; renal medulla; blood; monocyte; kidney tubule; vena cava; glomerulus; human kidney / Top expressed in: fetal liver hematopoietic progenitor cell; blood; tibiofemoral joint; human fetus; internal carotid artery; body of femur; external carotid artery; yolk sac; endocardial cushion; spleen; More reference expression data
BioGPS	More reference expression data
Gene ontology
Molecular function	protein homodimerization activity; protein-membrane adaptor activity; chloride transmembrane transporter activity; transporter activity; anion transmembrane transporter activity; bicarbonate transmembrane transporter activity; protein binding; ankyrin binding; inorganic anion exchanger activity; sodium:bicarbonate symporter activity; hemoglobin binding
Cellular component	integral component of membrane; blood microparticle; membrane; cortical cytoskeleton; plasma membrane; integral component of plasma membrane; basolateral plasma membrane; extracellular exosome; Z discdkac; cytoplasmic side of plasma membrane
Biological process	anion transport; bicarbonate transport; cellular ion homeostasis; chloride transport; ion transport; regulation of intracellular pH; anion transmembrane transport; chloride transmembrane transport; sodium ion transmembrane transport; transport; glycolytic process; blood coagulation; plasma membrane phospholipid scrambling; negative regulation of urine volume; pH elevation; erythrocyte development; protein localization to plasma membrane
Sources:Amigo / QuickGO
Orthologs
Databases	NCBI: entry; OMA: entry
Species	Human	Mouse
Entrez	6521	20533
Ensembl	ENSG00000004939	ENSMUSG00000006574
UniProt	P02730	P04919
RefSeq (mRNA)	NM_000342	NM_011403
RefSeq (protein)	NP_000333	NP_035533
Location (UCSC)	Chr 17: 44.25 – 44.27 Mb	Chr 11: 102.24 – 102.26 Mb
PubMed search
- Wikidata
View/Edit Human	View/Edit Mouse

Anion exchange protein 1 (AE1), also known as solute carrier family 4 member 1, is a protein that in humans is encoded by the gene SLC4A1.

Anion exchange protein 1 is a phylogenetically-preserved transport protein responsible for mediating the exchange of chloride (Cl^{−}) with bicarbonate (HCO_{3}^{−}>) across plasma membranes. Functionally similar members of the AE clade are AE2 and AE3.

== Function ==
AE1 is present in the basolateral face of the α-intercalated cells of the collecting ducts of the nephron, which are the main acid-secreting cells of the kidney. They generate hydrogen ions and bicarbonate ions from carbon dioxide and water – a reaction catalysed by carbonic anhydrase. The hydrogen ions are pumped into the collecting duct tubule by vacuolar H^{+} ATPase, the apical proton pump, which thus excretes acid into the urine. kAE1, the kidney isoform of AE1, exchanges bicarbonate for chloride on the basolateral surface, essentially returning bicarbonate to the blood. Here it performs two functions:

- Electroneutral chloride and bicarbonate exchange across the plasma membrane on a one-for-one basis. This is crucial for CO_{2} uptake by the red blood cell and conversion (by hydration catalysed by carbonic anhydrase) into a proton and a bicarbonate ion. The bicarbonate is then excreted (in exchange for a chloride) from the cell by AE1.
- Physical linkage of the plasma membrane to the underlying membrane skeleton (via binding with ankyrin and protein 4.2). This appears to be to prevent membrane surface loss, rather than having to do with membrane skeleton assembly.

== Distribution ==
It is ubiquitous throughout the vertebrates. In mammals, it is present in two specific sites:

- the erythrocyte (red blood cell) cell membrane and
- the basolateral surface of the alpha-intercalated cell (the acid secreting cell type) in the collecting duct of the kidney.

== Gene products ==
The erythrocyte and kidney forms are different isoforms of the same protein.

The erythrocyte isoform of AE1, known as eAE1, is composed of 911 amino acids. eAE1 is an important structural component of the erythrocyte cell membrane, making up to 25% of the cell membrane surface. Each red cell contains approximately one million copies of eAE1.

The kidney isoform of AE1, known as kAE1 (which is 65 amino acids shorter than erythroid AE1) is found in the basolateral membrane of alpha-intercalated cells in the cortical collecting duct and medullary collecting duct of the kidney.

== Clinical significance ==
It is an important cell membrane protein for interactions between red blood cells (RBC) and Plasmodium falciparum during malaria infection, particularly for strains of P. falciparum that do not exhibit sialic acid dependence for RBC invasion. It is the most abundant protein in the RBC cell membrane.

Mutations of kidney AE1 cause distal (type 1) renal tubular acidosis, which is an inability to acidify the urine, even if the blood is too acidic. These mutations are disease causing as they cause mistargeting of the mutant AE1 proteins so that they are retained within the cell or occasionally addressed to the wrong (i.e. apical) surface.

Mutations of erythroid AE1 affecting the extracellular domains of the molecule may cause alterations in the individual's blood group, as AE1 determines the Diego antigen system (blood group).

More importantly erythroid AE1 mutations cause 15–25% of cases of hereditary spherocytosis (a disorder associated with progressive red cell membrane loss), and also cause the hereditary conditions of hereditary stomatocytosis and Southeast Asian ovalocytosis.

== Interactions ==
AE1 has been shown to interact with CA2 and CA4.

== Discovery ==
AE1 was discovered following SDS-PAGE (sodium dodecyl sulfate polyacrylamide gel electrophoresis) of erythrocyte cell membrane. The large 'third' band on the electrophoresis gel represented AE1, which was thus initially termed 'Band 3'.

== See also ==
- Cluster of differentiation
- Anion exchanger family
