= SPTB =

Protein-coding gene in the species Homo sapiens

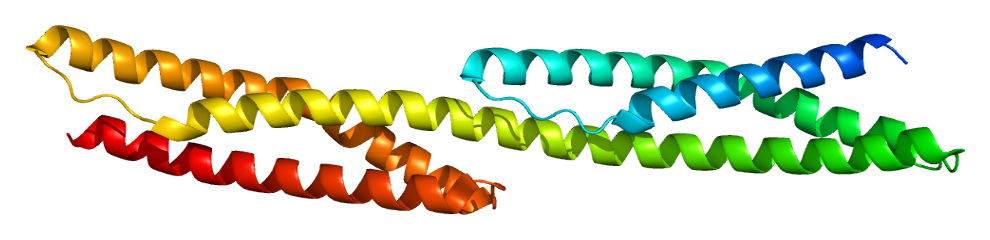

Identifiers
- Aliases: SPTB, EL3, HS2, HSPTB1, SPH2, spectrin beta, erythrocytic
- External IDs: OMIM: 182870; MGI: 98387; GeneCards: SPTB
Available structures
PDB	Ortholog search: PDBe RCSB
PDB	List of PDB id codes 1S35, 3EDU, 3F57, 3KBT, 3KBU, 3LBX

Gene location (Human)
Chr.	Chromosome 14 (human)
Band	14q23.3	Start	64,746,283 bp
Band	14q23.3	End	64,879,907 bp

Gene location (Mouse)
Chr.	Chromosome 12 (mouse)
Band	12 C3|12 33.73 cM	Start	76,627,262 bp
Band	12 C3|12 33.73 cM	End	76,757,321 bp
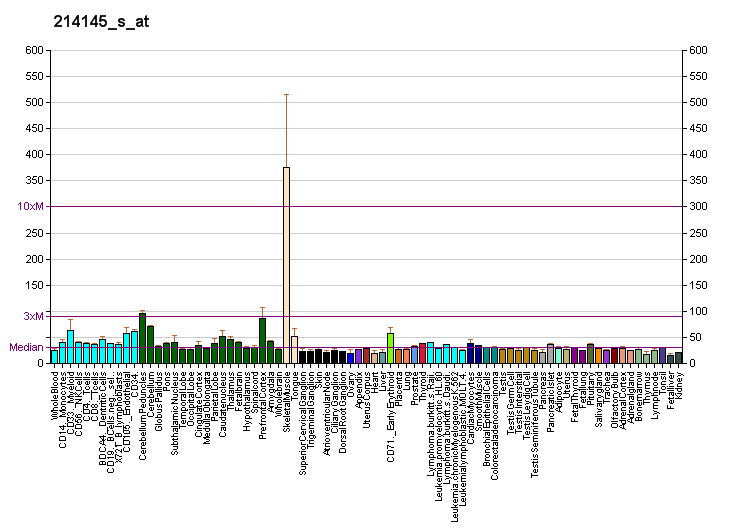

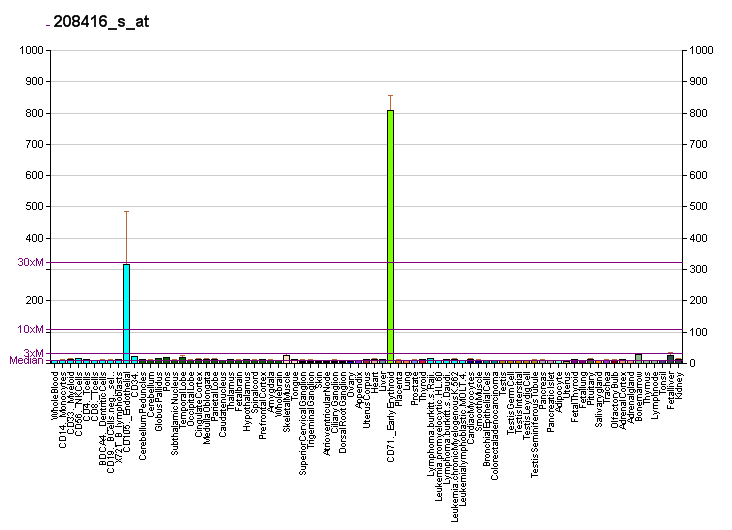
RNA expression pattern
Bgee	Human / Mouse (ortholog); Top expressed in: gastrocnemius muscle; muscle of thigh; apex of heart; Skeletal muscle tissue of rectus abdominis; tibialis anterior muscle; triceps brachii muscle; cerebellar hemisphere; right hemisphere of cerebellum; glutes; right auricle of heart / Top expressed in: muscle of thigh; fetal liver hematopoietic progenitor cell; epithelium of lens; dentate gyrus of hippocampal formation granule cell; cerebellar cortex; tibiofemoral joint; ankle; superior frontal gyrus; skeletal muscle tissue; pontine nuclei; More reference expression data
BioGPS	More reference expression data
Gene ontology
Molecular function	actin filament binding; structural constituent of cytoskeleton; protein binding; ankyrin binding; actin binding
Cellular component	spectrin; intrinsic component of the cytoplasmic side of the plasma membrane; cell surface; cell cortex; actin cytoskeleton; spectrin-associated cytoskeleton; cytoskeleton; cytoplasm; Golgi apparatus; cytosol; protein-containing complex
Biological process	MAPK cascade; axon guidance; endoplasmic reticulum to Golgi vesicle-mediated transport; actin filament capping; cytoskeleton organization
Sources:Amigo / QuickGO
Orthologs
Databases	NCBI: entry; OMA: entry
Species	Human	Mouse
Entrez	6710	20741
Ensembl	ENSG00000070182	ENSMUSG00000021061
UniProt	P11277	P15508
RefSeq (mRNA)	NM_000347; NM_001024858; NM_001355436; NM_001355437	NM_013675
RefSeq (protein)	NP_001020029; NP_001342365; NP_001342366	n/a
Location (UCSC)	Chr 14: 64.75 – 64.88 Mb	Chr 12: 76.63 – 76.76 Mb
PubMed search
- Wikidata
View/Edit Human	View/Edit Mouse

Spectrin beta chain, erythrocyte is a protein that in humans is encoded by the SPTB gene.
