= Dynactin =

Motor protein

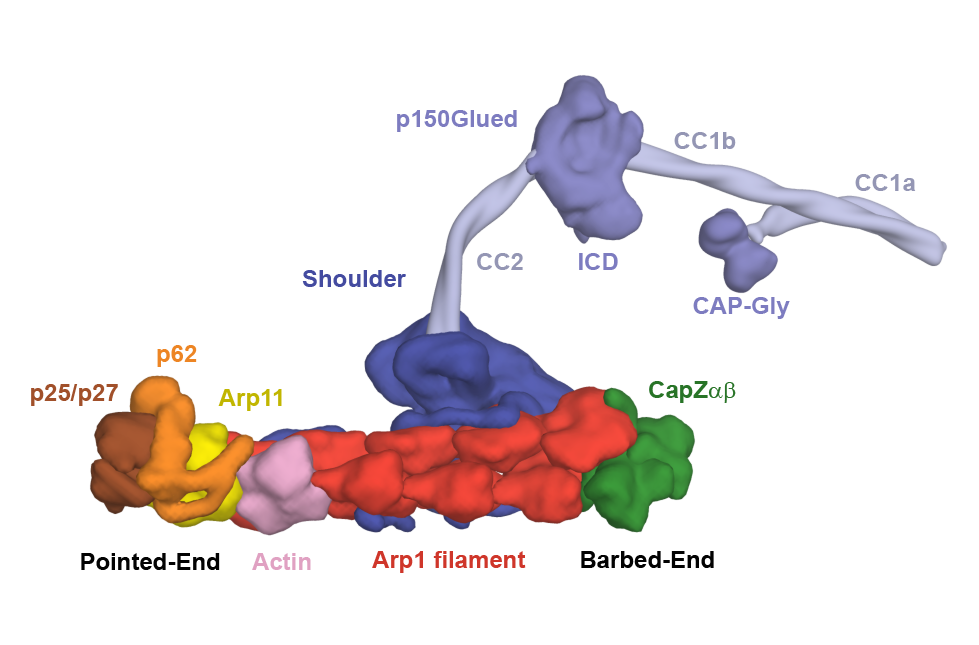
Quaternary structure of dynactin

Dynactin is a 23 subunit protein complex that acts as a co-factor for the microtubule motor cytoplasmic dynein-1. It is built around a short filament of actin related protein-1 (Arp1).

== Discovery ==
Dynactin was identified as an activity that allowed purified cytoplasmic dynein to move membrane vesicles along microtubules in vitro. It was shown to be a multiprotein complex and named "dynactin" because of its role in dynein activation.

The main features of dynactin were visualized by quick-freeze, deep-etch, rotary shadow electron microscopy. It appears as a short filament, 37-nm in length, which resembles F-actin, plus a thinner, laterally oriented arm. Antibody labelling was used to map the location of the dynactin subunits.

== Structure ==
Dynactin consists of three major structural domains: (1) sidearm-shoulder: DCTN1/p150Glued, DCTN2/p50/dynamitin, DCTN3/p24/p22;(2)the Arp1 filament: ACTR1A/Arp1/centractin, actin, CapZ; and (3) the pointed end complex: Actr10/Arp11, DCTN4/p62, DCTN5/p25, and DCTN6/p27.

A 4Å cryo-EM structure of dynactin revealed that its filament contains eight Arp1 molecules, one β-actin and one Arp11. In the pointed end complex p62/DCTN4 binds to Arp11 and β-actin and p25 and p27 bind both p62 and Arp11. At the barbed end the capping protein (CapZαβ) binds the Arp1 filament in the same way that it binds actin, although with more charge complementarity, explaining why it binds dynactin more tightly than actin.

The shoulder contains two copies of p150Glued/DCTN1, four copies of p50/DCTN2 and two copies of p24/DCTN3. These proteins form long bundles of alpha helices, which wrap over each other and contact the Arp1 filament. The N-termini of p50/DCTN2 emerge from the shoulder and coat the filament, providing a mechanism for controlling the filament length. The C-termini of the p150Glued/DCTN1 dimer are embedded in the shoulder, whereas the N-terminal 1227 amino acids form the projecting arm. The arm consists of an N-terminal CAPGly domain which can bind the C-terminal tails of microtubules and the microtubule plus end binding protein EB1. This is followed by a basic region, also involved in microtubule binding, a folded-back coiled coil (CC1), the intercoiled domain (ICD) and a second coiled coil domain (CC2). The p150Glued arm can dock into against the side of the Arp1 filament and pointed end complex.

DCTN2 (dynamitin) is also involved in anchoring microtubules to centrosomes and may play a role in synapse formation during brain development. Arp1 has been suggested as the domain for dynactin binding to membrane vesicles (such as Golgi or late endosome) through its association with β-spectrin. The pointed end complex (PEC) has been shown to be involved in selective cargo binding. PEC subunits p62/DCTN4 and Arp11/Actr10 are essential for dynactin complex integrity and dynactin/dynein targeting to the nuclear envelope before mitosis. Actr10 along with Drp1 (Dynamin related protein 1) have been documented as vital to the attachment of mitochondria to the dynactin complex. Dynactin p25/DCTN5 and p27/DCTN6 are not essential for dynactin complex integrity, but are required for early and recycling endosome transport during the interphase and regulation of the spindle assembly checkpoint in mitosis.

== Interaction with dynein ==
Dynein and dynactin were reported to interact directly by the binding of dynein intermediate chains with p150^{Glued}. The affinity of this interaction is around 3.5μM. Dynein and dynactin do not run together in a sucrose gradient, but can be induced to form a tight complex in the presence of the N-terminal 400 amino acids of Bicaudal D2 (BICD2), a cargo adaptor that links dynein and dynactin to Golgi derived vesicles. In the presence of BICD2, dynactin binds to dynein and activates it to move for long distances along microtubules.

A cryo-EM structure of dynein, dynactin and BICD2 showed that the BICD2 coiled coil runs along the dynactin filament. The tail of dynein also binds to the Arp1 filament, sitting in the equivalent site that myosin uses to bind actin. The contacts between the dynein tail and dynactin all involve BICD, explaining why it is needed to bring them together. The dynein/dynactin/BICD2 (DDB) complex has also been observed, by negative stain EM, on microtubules. This shows that the cargo (Rab6) binding end of BICD2 extends out through the pointed end complex at the opposite end away from the dynein motor domains.

== Functions ==
Dynactin is often essential for dynein activity and can be thought of as a "dynein receptor" that modulates binding of dynein to cell organelles which are to be transported along microtubules. Dynactin also enhances the processivity of cytoplasmic dynein and kinesin-2 motors. Dynactin is involved in various processes like chromosome alignment and spindle organization in cell division. Dynactin contributes to mitotic spindle pole focusing through its binding to nuclear mitotic apparatus protein (NuMA). Dynactin also targets to the kinetochore through binding between DCTN2/dynamitin and zw10 and has a role in mitotic spindle checkpoint inactivation. During prometaphase, dynactin also helps target polo-like kinase 1 (Plk1) to kinetochores through cyclin dependent kinase 1 (Cdk1)-phosphorylated DCTN6/p27, which is involved in proper microtubule-kinetochore attachment and recruitment of spindle assembly checkpoint protein Mad1. In addition, dynactin has been shown to play an essential role in maintaining nuclear position in Drosophila, zebrafish or in different fungi. Dynein and dynactin concentrate on the nuclear envelope during the prophase and facilitate nuclear envelope breakdown via its DCTN4/p62 and Arp11 subunits. Dynactin is also required for microtubule anchoring at centrosomes and centrosome integrity. Destabilization of the centrosomal pool of dynactin also causes abnormal G1 centriole separation and delayed entry into S phase, suggesting that dynactin contributes to the recruitment of important cell cycle regulators to centrosomes. In addition to transport of various organelles in the cytoplasm, dynactin also links kinesin II to organelles.

== See also ==
- Motor protein
- Dynein
- DCTN1
- Centractin
