= Ankyrin-2 =

Protein-coding gene in the species Homo sapiens

ANK2
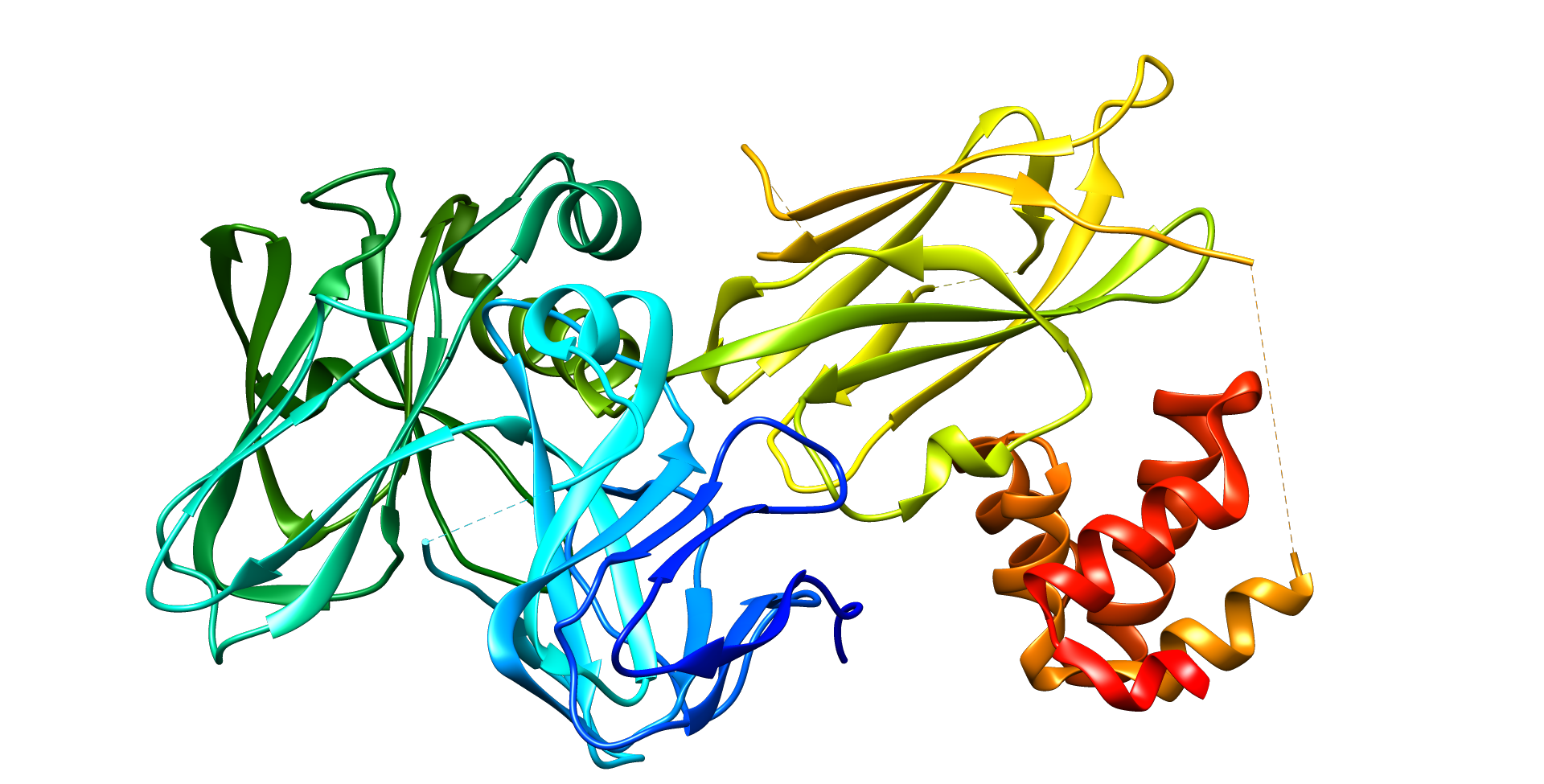

Identifiers
- Aliases: ANK2, ANK-2, LQT4, brank-2, ankyrin 2, neuronal, ankyrin 2
- External IDs: OMIM: 106410; GeneCards: ANK2
Available structures
PDB	Human UniProt search: PDBe RCSB
PDB	List of PDB id codes 4D8O, 4RLV, 4RLY
Gene ontology
Molecular function	protein-macromolecule adaptor activity; spectrin binding; transmembrane transporter binding; ATPase binding; structural constituent of cytoskeleton; protein binding; enzyme binding; protein kinase binding; phosphorylation-dependent protein binding
Cellular component	M band; cytoplasm; cytosol; postsynaptic membrane; membrane; intercalated disc; T-tubule; synapse; intracellular anatomical structure; cell junction; basolateral plasma membrane; Z discdkac; apical plasma membrane; membrane raft; neuron projection; sarcolemma; A band; cytoskeleton; costamere; mitochondrion; lysosome; endosome; early endosome; recycling endosome; plasma membrane; axon initial segment
Biological process	positive regulation of potassium ion transmembrane transporter activity; protein localization to organelle; positive regulation of cation channel activity; regulation of cardiac muscle contraction by calcium ion signaling; regulation of calcium ion transport; regulation of protein stability; regulation of cardiac muscle contraction by regulation of the release of sequestered calcium ion; positive regulation of potassium ion transport; regulation of release of sequestered calcium ion into cytosol; SA node cell action potential; protein stabilization; ventricular cardiac muscle cell action potential; cellular calcium ion homeostasis; positive regulation of calcium ion transmembrane transporter activity; nervous system development; regulation of heart rate; protein localization to M-band; endoplasmic reticulum to Golgi vesicle-mediated transport; regulation of cardiac muscle cell contraction; protein localization to T-tubule; positive regulation of gene expression; protein localization to cell surface; paranodal junction assembly; atrial cardiac muscle cell action potential; sarcoplasmic reticulum calcium ion transport; SA node cell to atrial cardiac muscle cell communication; membrane depolarization during SA node cell action potential; atrial cardiac muscle cell to AV node cell communication; regulation of cardiac muscle contraction; protein localization to endoplasmic reticulum; response to methylmercury; regulation of SA node cell action potential; regulation of heart rate by cardiac conduction; atrial septum development; regulation of calcium ion transmembrane transporter activity; signal transduction; regulation of atrial cardiac muscle cell action potential; T-tubule organization; positive regulation of calcium ion transport; regulation of ventricular cardiac muscle cell membrane repolarization; cytoskeleton organization; protein localization to plasma membrane; endocytosis; protein transport
Sources:Amigo / QuickGO
Orthologs
Databases	NCBI: entry; OMA: entry
Species	Human	Mouse
Entrez	287	n/a
Ensembl	ENSG00000145362	n/a
UniProt	Q01484	n/a
RefSeq (mRNA)	NM_001127493; NM_001148; NM_020977	n/a
RefSeq (protein)	NP_001120965; NP_001139; NP_066187; NP_001341154; NP_001341157 NP_001341159; NP_001341160; NP_001341161; NP_001341164; NP_001341165; NP_001341166; NP_001341168; NP_001341169; NP_001341170; NP_001341171; NP_001341172; NP_001341173; NP_001341174; NP_001341175; NP_001341178; NP_001341181; NP_001341182; NP_001341183; NP_001341184; NP_001341185; NP_001341186; NP_001341187; NP_001341189; NP_001341190; NP_001341191; NP_001341193; NP_001341194; NP_001341195; NP_001341196; NP_001341197; NP_001341198; NP_001341199; NP_001341200; NP_001341201; NP_001341202; NP_001341203; NP_001341204; NP_001341205; NP_001341206; NP_001341207; NP_001341208; NP_001341209; NP_001341210; NP_001341211	n/a
Location (UCSC)	n/a	n/a
PubMed search		n/a
- Wikidata
View/Edit Human

Ankyrin-2, also known as Ankyrin-B, and Brain ankyrin, is a protein which in humans is encoded by the ANK2 gene. Ankyrin-2 is ubiquitously expressed, but shows high expression in cardiac muscle. Ankyrin-2 plays an essential role in the localization and membrane stabilization of ion transporters and ion channels in cardiomyocytes, as well as in costamere structures. Mutations in ANK2 cause a dominantly-inherited, cardiac arrhythmia syndrome known as long QT syndrome 4 as well as sick sinus syndrome; mutations have also been associated to a lesser degree with hypertrophic cardiomyopathy. Alterations in ankyrin-2 expression levels are observed in human heart failure.

== Structure ==
Ankyrin-B protein is around 220 kDa, with several isoforms. The ANK2 gene is approximately 560 kb in size and consists of 53 exons on human chromosome 4; ANK2 is also transcriptionally regulated via over 30 alternative splicing events with variable expression of isoforms in cardiac muscle. Ankyrin-B is a member of the ankyrin family of proteins, and is a modular protein which is composed of three structural domains: an N-terminal domain containing multiple ankyrin repeats; a central region with a highly conserved spectrin binding domain and death domain; and a C-terminal regulatory domain which is the least conserved and subject to variation, and determines ankyrin-B activity. The membrane-binding region of ankyrin-B is composed of 24 consecutive ankyrin repeats, and it is the membrane-binding domain of ankyrins that confer functional differences among ankyrin isoforms. Though ubiquitously expressed, ankyrin-B shows high expression levels in cardiac muscle, and is expressed 10-fold lower levels in skeletal muscle, suggesting that ankyrin-B plays a specifically adapted functional role in cardiac muscle.

== Function ==
Ankyrin-B is a member of the ankyrin family of proteins. Ankyrin-1 has been shown to be essential in normal function of erythrocytes; however, ankyrin-B and ankyrin-3 play essential roles in the localization and membrane stabilization of ion transporters and ion channels in cardiomyocytes.

Functional insights into ankyrin-B function have come from studies employing ankyrin-B chimeric proteins. One study showed that the death/C-terminal domain of ankyrin-B determines both the subcellular localization as well as activity in restoring normal inositol trisphosphate receptor and ryanodine receptor localization and cardiomyocyte contractility. Further studies have shown that the beta-hairpin loops within the ankyrin repeat domain of ankyrin-B are required for the interaction with the inositol trisphosphate receptor, and a reduction of ankyrin-B in neonatal cardiomyocytes reduces the half-life of the inositol trisphosphate receptor by 3-fold and destabilizes its proper localization; all of these effects were rescued by reintroducing ankyrin-B. Moreover, a specific sequence in ankyrin-B (absent in other ankyrin isoforms) folds as an amphipathic alpha helix is required for normal levels of sodium-calcium exchanger, sodium potassium ATPase and inositol triphosphate receptor in cardiomyocytes, and is regulated by HDJ1/HSP40 binding to this region.

Additional insights into ankyrin-B function have come from studies employing ankyrin-B transgenic animals. Cardiomyocytes from ankyrin-B (-/+) mice exhibited irregular spatial patterns and periodicity of calcium release, as well as abnormal distribution of the sarcomplasmic reticular calcium ATPase, SERCA2, and ryanodine receptors; effects that were rescued by transfection of ankyrin-B. Effects on ryanodine receptors specifically were also rescued by a potent Ca2+/calmodulin-dependent protein kinase II inhibitor, suggesting that inhibition of Ca2+/calmodulin-dependent protein kinase II may also be a potential treatment strategy. These mice also display several electrophysiological abnormalities, including bradycardia, variable heart rate, long QT intervals, catecholaminergic polymorphic ventricular tachycardia, syncope, and sudden cardiac death. Mechanistic explanations underlying these effects were explained in a later study conducted in the ankyrin-B (-/+) mice, which showed that reduction of ankyrin-B alters the transport of sodium and calcium and enhances the coupled openings of ryanodine receptors, which results in a higher frequency of calcium sparks and waves of calcium.

It is now becoming clear that ankyrin-B exists in a biomolecular complex with the sodium potassium ATPase, sodium calcium exchanger and inositol triphosphate receptor which is localized in T-tubules within discrete microdomains of cardiomyocytes that are distinct from dyads formed by dihydropyridine receptors complexed to ryanodine receptors. The human ankyrin-B arrhythmogenic mutation (Glu1425Gly) blocks the formation of this complex, which provides a mechanism behind cardiac arrhythmias in patients. Studies from other labs have shed light on the requirement of ankyrin-B in the targeting and post-translational stability of the sodium calcium exchanger in cardiomyocytes, which is clinically important because elevated expression of the sodium calcium exchanger is a factor related to arrhythmia and heart failure. Ankyrin-B forms a membrane complex with ATP-sensitive potassium channels, which is necessary for normal channel trafficking and targeting the channel to sarcolemmal membranes; this interaction is also important in the response of cardiomyocytes to cardiac ischemia and metabolic regulation.

Ankyrin-B has also been identified to associate at sarcomeric M-lines and costameres in cardiac muscle and skeletal muscle, respectively. Exon 43′ in ankyrin-B is specifically and predominantly expressed in cardiac muscle and harbors key residues for modulating the interaction between ankyrin-B and obscurin. This interaction is also key for targeting protein phosphatase 2A to cardiac M-lines to propagate phosphorylation signaling paradigms. In skeletal muscle, ankyrin-B interacts with dynactin-4 and with β2-spectrin, which is required for proper localization and functioning of the dystrophin complex and costamere structures, as well as protection from exercise-induced injury.

== Clinical significance ==
Mutations in the ANK2 gene have been associated with a dominantly-inherited, cardiac arrhythmia syndrome known as long QT syndrome, type 4, also known as ankyrin-B syndrome which can be described as an atypical arrhythmia syndrome with bradycardia, atrial fibrillation, conduction block, arrhythmia and risk of sudden cardiac death. Intense investigation has been carried out regarding the linking of ANK2 mutations to the range of severity of cardiac phenotypes, and initial evidence suggests that the varying degrees of loss of function of ankyrin-B may explain the effect of any particular mutation.

Initially, a Glu1425Gly mutation in ANK2 was found to cause dominantly-inherited long QT syndrome type 4, cardiac arrhythmia. The mechanistic underpinnings of this mutation include abnormal expression and targeting of the sodium pump, the sodium-calcium exchanger, and inositol-1,4,5-trisphosphate receptors to transverse tubules, as well as calcium handling resulting in extrasystoles. Further analysis in ANK2 mutations localized in the regulatory domain of ankyrin-2, which is specific to the ankyrin-2 isoform, indicated that long QT syndrome was not a consistent clinical manifestation of ANK2 mutations; however, the effect on Ca(2+) dynamics and localization/expression of the sodium calcium exchanger, sodium potassium ATPase and inositol triphosphate receptor in cardiomyocytes were consistent observations. This study demonstrated that common pathogenic features of all ANK2 mutations was the abnormal coordination of a panel of related ion channels and transporters. Additional mechanistic studies have shown that atrial cardiomyocytes lacking ankyrin-B have shortened action potentials, which can be explained by decreased voltage-dependent calcium channel expression, specifically Ca(v)1.3, which is responsible for low voltage-activated L-type Ca(2+) currents. Ankyrin-B directly associates with and is required for targeting Ca(v)1.3 to membranes.

ANK2 mutations have also been identified in patients with sinus node dysfunction. Mechanistic studies on effects of these mutations in mice showed severe bradycardia and variability in heart rate, as well as dysfunction in ankyrin-B-based trafficking pathways in primary and subsidiary pacemaker cells. In a large genotype-phenotype study of 874 patients with hypertrophic cardiomyopathy, patients with ANK2 variants exhibited greater maximum left ventricular wall thickness.

In patients with both ischemic and non-ischemic heart failure, ankyrin-B levels are altered. Further mechanistic study showed that reactive oxygen species, intracellular calcium and calpain regulate cardiac ankyrin-B levels, and ankyrin-B is required for normal cardioprotection following ischemia reperfusion injury.

== Interactions ==
- ITPR1
- HDJ1/HSP40
- SPTBN1
- OBSCN
- DMD
- DCTN4
- tubulin
