= ACTR1B =

Protein-coding gene in humans

Identifiers
- Aliases: ACTR1B, ARP1B, CTRN2, PC3, ARP1 actin-related protein 1 homolog B, centractin beta, ARP1 actin related protein 1 homolog B, actin related protein 1B
- External IDs: OMIM: 605144; MGI: 1917446; GeneCards: ACTR1B

Gene location (Human)
Chr.	Chromosome 2 (human)
Band	2q11.2	Start	97,655,939 bp
Band	2q11.2	End	97,664,044 bp

Gene location (Mouse)
Chr.	Chromosome 1 (mouse)
Band	1|1 B	Start	36,737,195 bp
Band	1|1 B	End	36,753,503 bp
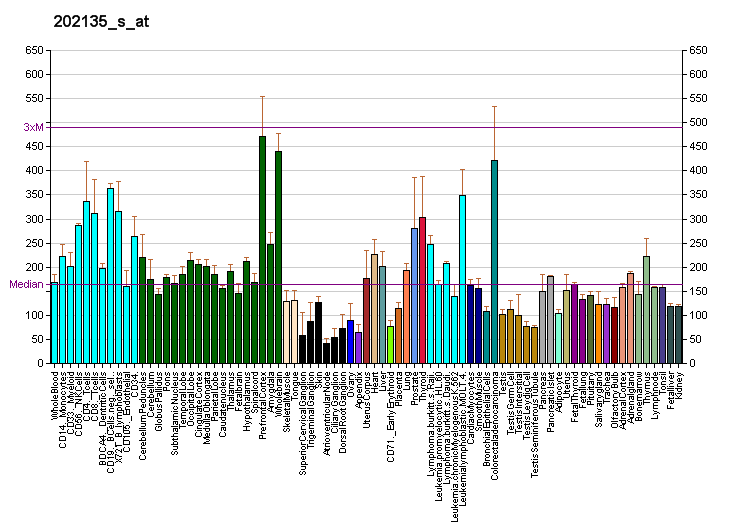
RNA expression pattern
Bgee	Human / Mouse (ortholog); Top expressed in: right frontal lobe; right hemisphere of cerebellum; prefrontal cortex; body of pancreas; apex of heart; Brodmann area 9; right uterine tube; left adrenal cortex; right adrenal gland; body of uterus / Top expressed in: superior frontal gyrus; neural layer of retina; dentate gyrus of hippocampal formation granule cell; muscle of thigh; yolk sac; cerebellar cortex; primary visual cortex; lip; right kidney; external carotid artery; More reference expression data
BioGPS	More reference expression data
Gene ontology
Molecular function	nucleotide binding; protein binding; ATP binding; cytoskeletal protein-membrane anchor activity
Cellular component	cytoplasm; microtubule cytoskeleton; cytosol; centrosome; extracellular exosome; cytoskeleton; membrane; dynactin complex; microtubule organizing center; extracellular region; secretory granule lumen; ficolin-1-rich granule lumen; cell cortex region
Biological process	antigen processing and presentation of exogenous peptide antigen via MHC class II; neutrophil degranulation; establishment of mitotic spindle orientation; nuclear migration along microtubule
Sources:Amigo / QuickGO
Orthologs
Databases	NCBI: entry; OMA: entry
Species	Human	Mouse
Entrez	10120	226977
Ensembl	ENSG00000115073	ENSMUSG00000037351
UniProt	P42025	Q8R5C5
RefSeq (mRNA)	NM_005735	NM_146107
RefSeq (protein)	NP_005726	NP_666219
Location (UCSC)	Chr 2: 97.66 – 97.66 Mb	Chr 1: 36.74 – 36.75 Mb
PubMed search
- Wikidata
View/Edit Human	View/Edit Mouse

Beta-centractin is a protein that in humans is encoded by the ACTR1B gene.

This gene encodes a 42.3 kD subunit of dynactin, a macromolecular complex consisting of 10 subunits ranging in size from 22 to 150 kD. Dynactin binds to both microtubules and cytoplasmic dynein. It is involved in a diverse array of cellular functions, including ER-to-Golgi transport, the centripetal movement of lysosomes and endosomes, spindle formation, chromosome movement, nuclear positioning, and axonogenesis. This subunit, like ACTR1A, is an actin-related protein. These two proteins are of equal length and share 90% amino acid identity. They are present in a constant ratio of approximately 1:15 in the dynactin complex.
