= DCTN6 =

Identifiers
- Aliases: DCTN6, WS-3, WS3, p27, dynactin subunit 6
- External IDs: OMIM: 612963; MGI: 1343154; GeneCards: DCTN6
Available structures
PDB	Ortholog search: PDBe RCSB
PDB	List of PDB id codes 3TV0

Gene location (Human)
Chr.	Chromosome 8 (human)
Band	8p12	Start	30,156,319 bp
Band	8p12	End	30,183,639 bp

Gene location (Mouse)
Chr.	Chromosome 8 (mouse)
Band	8|8 A4	Start	34,557,574 bp
Band	8|8 A4	End	34,575,950 bp
RNA expression pattern
Bgee	Human / Mouse (ortholog); Top expressed in: myocardium; C1 segment; right ventricle; pars reticulata; vena cava; subthalamic nucleus; internal globus pallidus; pons; pars compacta; myocardium of left ventricle / Top expressed in: Rostral migratory stream; tunica media of zone of aorta; ascending aorta; motor neuron; aortic valve; neural layer of retina; iris; median eminence; carotid body; lateral septal nucleus; More reference expression data
BioGPS	n/a
Gene ontology
Molecular function	protein binding
Cellular component	cytosol; dynactin complex; cytoplasm; centrosome; chromosome, centromeric region; chromosome; cytoskeleton; kinetochore
Biological process	antigen processing and presentation of exogenous peptide antigen via MHC class II; endoplasmic reticulum to Golgi vesicle-mediated transport
Sources:Amigo / QuickGO
Orthologs
Databases	NCBI: entry; OMA: entry
Species	Human	Mouse
Entrez	10671	22428
Ensembl	ENSG00000104671	ENSMUSG00000031516
UniProt	O00399	Q9WUB4
RefSeq (mRNA)	NM_006571	NM_001293757; NM_001293758; NM_001293759; NM_011722
RefSeq (protein)	NP_006562	NP_001280686; NP_001280687; NP_001280688; NP_035852
Location (UCSC)	Chr 8: 30.16 – 30.18 Mb	Chr 8: 34.56 – 34.58 Mb
PubMed search
- Wikidata
View/Edit Human	View/Edit Mouse

In molecular biology, DCTN6 is that subunit of the dynactin protein complex that is encoded by the p27 gene. Dynactin is the essential component for microtubule-based cytoplasmic dynein motor activity in intracellular transport of a variety of cargoes and organelles.

== Identification and structure ==
DCTN6 was first identified and cloned as a subunit of the "pointed-end complex" of dynactin through biochemical purification.

X-ray crystal structure revealed that dynactin p27 forms an unusual left handed β-helix (LβH) domain, and its phosphorylation site T186 is in C-terminal disordered segment.

== Function ==
=== In intracellular transport ===
Dynactin p27 forms a hetero-dimer with the other dynactin pointed-end complex subunit p25/DCTN5 in 1:1 ratio, and it is essential for p25 stability since they are co-knockdown by p27 RNAi. However, both p27 and p25 are not required for 19S dynactin complex integrity verified by velocity sedimentation. p27/DCTN6 and other dynactin pointed-end complex subunits (Arp11/Actr10, p62/DCTN4, and p25/DCTN5) have been suggested to be involved in dynactin binding to specific intracellular cargoes. Co-depletion of dynactin p27 and p25 by p27 RNAi affects dynactin binding to endomembrane, and early and recycling endosome movements are impaired, suggesting that p27/p25 form a selective endomembrane cargo-targeting module.

=== In mitosis ===
In mitosis, unlike dynactin or dynein perturbation that causes mitotic spindle disarrangement and mitotic arrest, dynactin p27/p25 depletion does not affect mitotic spindle formation, pole focusing or dynein/dynactin targeting to kinetochores. However, dynactin p27/p25 are required for normal chromosome alignment, kinetochore-microtubule interaction, and proper timing of anaphase onset. Dynactin p27 C-terminal T186 residue is phosphorylated by cyclin-dependent kinase 1 (Cdk1) in mitosis and helps target polo-like kinase 1 (Plk1) to kinetochores during prometaphase. This activity facilitates phosphorylation of important downstream kinetochore targets (such as tension-sensing 3F3/2 phospho-epitope) of Plk1, which is important for recruitment of spindle assembly checkpoint proteins such as Mad1 and proper kinetochore-microtubule attachment.
