= CEP89 =

Protein-coding gene in the species Homo sapiens

Identifiers
- Aliases: CEP89, CCDC123, CEP123, centrosomal protein 89
- External IDs: OMIM: 615470; MGI: 1919390; GeneCards: CEP89

Gene location (Human)
| Chr. | Chromosome 19 (human) |
| Band | 19q13.11 | Start | 32,875,925 bp |
| Band | 19q13.11 | End | 32,971,991 bp |
RNA expression pattern
| Bgee | Human / Mouse (ortholog); Top expressed in: ventricular zone; ganglionic eminence; tendon of biceps brachii; Achilles tendon; testicle; stromal cell of endometrium; sural nerve; body of uterus; endothelial cell; left ovary / n/a; More reference expression data |
| BioGPS | n/a |
Gene ontology
| Molecular function | protein binding |
| Cellular component | microtubule organizing center; centriole; mitochondrial intermembrane space; centrosome; plasma membrane; motile cilium; spindle pole; cytoskeleton; mitochondrion; ciliary transition fiber; cytoplasm; cytosol; non-motile cilium |
| Biological process | cell projection organization; mitochondrion organization; chemical synaptic transmission; cilium assembly; ciliary basal body-plasma membrane docking; non-motile cilium assembly |
Sources:Amigo / QuickGO
Orthologs
| Databases | NCBI: entry; OMA: entry |
| Species | Human | Mouse |
| Entrez | 84902 | 72140 |
| Ensembl | ENSG00000121289 | ENSMUSG00000023072 |
| UniProt | Q96ST8 | Q9CZX2 |
| RefSeq (mRNA) | NM_032816 | NM_028120 |
| RefSeq (protein) | NP_116205 | NP_082396 |
| Location (UCSC) | Chr 19: 32.88 – 32.97 Mb | n/a |
| PubMed search |
- Wikidata
| View/Edit Human | View/Edit Mouse |

Centrosomal protein 89, also known as Centrosomal protein of 89 kDa (CEP89), Centrosomal protein 123 (CEP123), or Coiled-coil domain-containing protein 123 is a protein that in humans is encoded by the CEP89 gene.

== Structure ==
The CEP89 gene is located on the q arm of chromosome 19 at position 13.11 and it spans 96,104 base pairs. The CEP89 gene produces a 54.4 kDa protein composed of 476 amino acids. The structure of the protein has been found to be similar to a ring. It is associated and dependent on the orientation of centrioles, which are attached in the exterior region. The protein contains two coiled-coil domains and a putative mitochondrial-targeting signal. Experiments have shown that CEP89 is found within the intermembrane space, as well as the cytosol of the mitochondria.

== Function ==
The CEP89 gene encodes for a protein required for ciliogenesis. It plays a role in mitochondrial metabolism by modulating complex IV activity. CEP89 has also been shown to be responsible for the integrity of the mitochondria, membrane depolarization, synaptic transmission of photoreceptor neurons and for the synaptic organization of the larval neuromuscular junction.

== Clinical significance ==
Variants of CEP89 have been associated with the mitochondrial Complex IV deficiency, a deficiency in an enzyme complex of the mitochondrial respiratory chain which catalyzes the oxidation of cytochrome c utilizing molecular oxygen. The deficiency is characterized by heterogeneous phenotypes ranging from isolated myopathy to severe multisystem disease affecting several tissues and organs. Other Clinical Manifestations include hypertrophic cardiomyopathy, hepatomegaly and liver dysfunction, hypotonia, muscle weakness, exercise intolerance, developmental delay, delayed motor development and intellectual disability. Pathogenic mutations of CEP89 has also been found to be associated with multisystemic disorders such as cystinuria, cataract, broad based walking pattern, deafness, and others. A CEP89 loss-of-function has been shown to lead to a severe decrease in complex activity and altered mobility, which are signs of dysfunction in the complex IV resulting in complete lethality. A Homozygous deletion in the CEP89 gene has resulted in an isolated complex IV deficiency confirmed by decreased ATP production and reduced oxidation of pyruvate (1-[14C]) and malate.

== Interactions ==
CEP89 has interactions with proteins such as PICK1, LATS2, ERC1, CEP72, ADSL and others.
