= ACTR1A =

Protein-coding gene in the species Homo sapiens

Identifiers
- Aliases: ACTR1A, ARP1, CTRN1, Arp1A, ARP1 actin-related protein 1 homolog A, centractin alpha, ARP1 actin related protein 1 homolog A, actin related protein 1A
- External IDs: OMIM: 605143; MGI: 1858964; GeneCards: ACTR1A

Gene location (Human)
Chr.	Chromosome 10 (human)
Band	10q24.32	Start	102,461,881 bp
Band	10q24.32	End	102,502,712 bp

Gene location (Mouse)
Chr.	Chromosome 19 (mouse)
Band	19|19 C3	Start	46,365,250 bp
Band	19|19 C3	End	46,384,187 bp
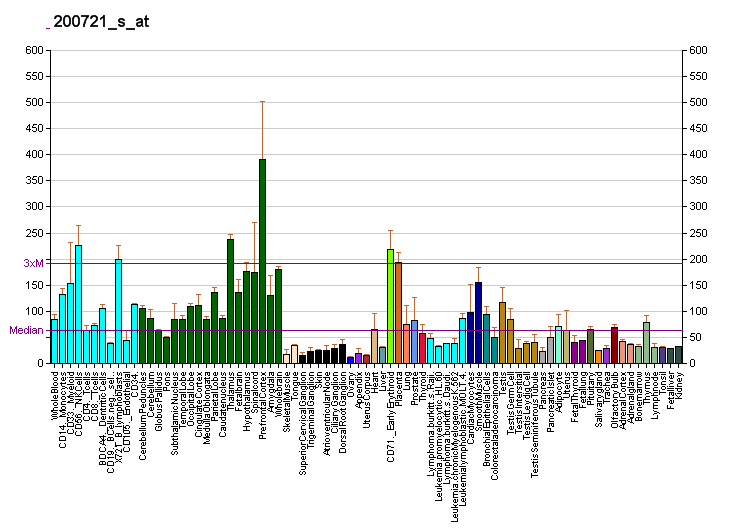

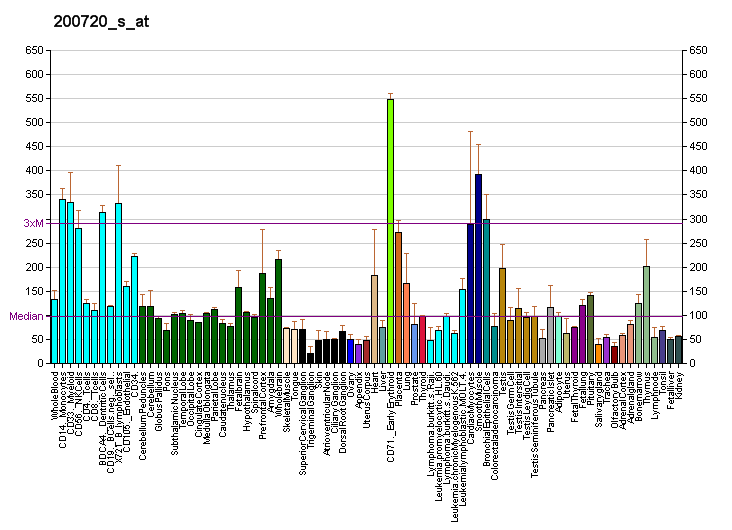

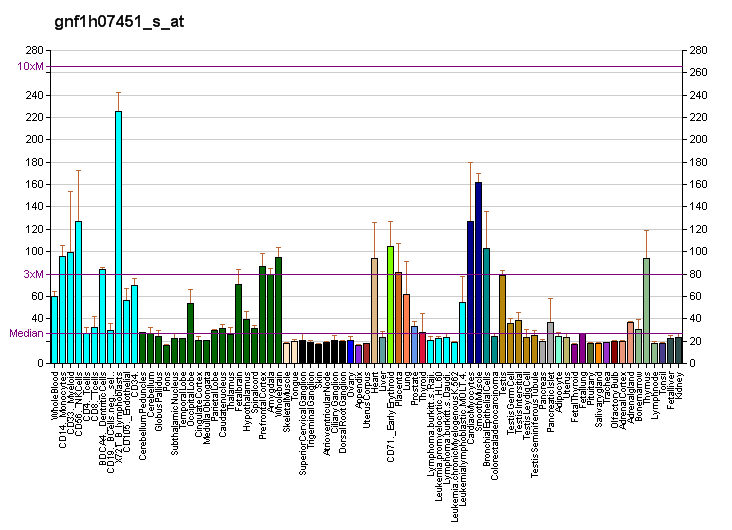
RNA expression pattern
Bgee	Human / Mouse (ortholog); Top expressed in: ganglionic eminence; gastrocnemius muscle; prefrontal cortex; right frontal lobe; stromal cell of endometrium; muscle layer of sigmoid colon; cingulate gyrus; anterior cingulate cortex; apex of heart; C1 segment / Top expressed in: otic vesicle; saccule; spermatocyte; otic placode; spermatid; facial motor nucleus; lip; ganglionic eminence; external carotid artery; internal carotid artery; More reference expression data
BioGPS	More reference expression data
Gene ontology
Molecular function	ATP binding; nucleotide binding; protein binding; cytoskeletal protein-membrane anchor activity
Cellular component	cytosol; microtubule cytoskeleton; microtubule associated complex; cytoplasm; myelin sheath; centrosome; microtubule organizing center; cytoskeleton; extracellular exosome; dynactin complex; manchette; centriole; COPI-coated vesicle; cell cortex region; cell cortex
Biological process	G2/M transition of mitotic cell cycle; antigen processing and presentation of exogenous peptide antigen via MHC class II; vesicle-mediated transport; spermatogenesis; ciliary basal body-plasma membrane docking; endoplasmic reticulum to Golgi vesicle-mediated transport; regulation of G2/M transition of mitotic cell cycle; establishment of mitotic spindle orientation; nuclear migration along microtubule
Sources:Amigo / QuickGO
Orthologs
Databases	NCBI: entry; OMA: entry
Species	Human	Mouse
Entrez	10121	54130
Ensembl	ENSG00000138107	ENSMUSG00000025228
UniProt	P61163	P61164
RefSeq (mRNA)	NM_005736	NM_016860; NM_001365070
RefSeq (protein)	NP_005727	NP_058556; NP_001351999
Location (UCSC)	Chr 10: 102.46 – 102.5 Mb	Chr 19: 46.37 – 46.38 Mb
PubMed search
- Wikidata
View/Edit Human	View/Edit Mouse

Alpha-centractin (yeast) or ARP1 is a protein that in humans is encoded by the ACTR1A gene.

== Function ==
This gene encodes a 42.6 kD subunit of dynactin, a macromolecular complex consisting of 10-11 subunits ranging in size from 22 to 150 kD. Dynactin binds to both microtubules and cytoplasmic dynein. It is involved in a diverse array of cellular functions, including ER-to-Golgi transport, the centripetal movement of lysosomes and endosomes, spindle formation, chromosome movement, nuclear positioning, and axonogenesis. This subunit is present in 8-13 copies per dynactin molecule, and is the most abundant molecule in the dynactin complex. It is an actin-related protein, and is approximately 60% identical at the amino acid level to conventional actin. ARP1 forms a 37 nm filament-like structure and is the core of the dynactin complex. It only exists in the dynactin complex in vivo. Highly purified, native Arp1 polymerize rapidly at extremely low concentrations into short filaments in vitro that were similar, but not identical, in length to those in dynactin. With time, these Arp1 filaments appeared to anneal to form longer assemblies but never attained the length of conventional actin filaments. As for conventional actin, Arp1 can bind and hydrolyze ATP, and Arp1 assembly is accompanied by nucleotide hydrolysis.

It has been reported that Arp1 interacts with other dynactin components including DCTN1/p150^{Glued}, DCTN4/p62 and Actr10/Arp11. Arp1 has been shown as the domain for dynactin binding to membrane vesicles (such as Golgi or late endosome) through its association with β-spectrin.

== Interactions ==
ACTR1A has been shown to interact with SPTBN2.
