= Ankyrin-3 =

Protein-coding gene in the species Homo sapiens

ANK3

Identifiers
- Aliases: ANK3, ANKYRIN-G, MRT37, ankyrin 3, node of Ranvier (ankyrin G), ankyrin 3
- External IDs: OMIM: 600465; MGI: 88026; GeneCards: ANK3
Available structures
PDB	Ortholog search: PDBe RCSB
PDB	List of PDB id codes 4O6X

Gene location (Human)
Chr.	Chromosome 10 (human)
Band	10q21.2	Start	60,026,298 bp
Band	10q21.2	End	60,733,490 bp

Gene location (Mouse)
Chr.	Chromosome 10 (mouse)
Band	10 B5.3|10 36.1 cM	Start	69,398,773 bp
Band	10 B5.3|10 36.1 cM	End	70,027,438 bp
RNA expression pattern
Bgee	Human / Mouse (ortholog); Top expressed in: endothelial cell; Brodmann area 23; dorsal motor nucleus of vagus nerve; middle temporal gyrus; Region I of hippocampus proper; lateral nuclear group of thalamus; inferior olivary nucleus; postcentral gyrus; cerebellar vermis; pars compacta / Top expressed in: lateral geniculate nucleus; pontine nuclei; ventromedial nucleus; mammillary body; medial geniculate nucleus; lateral hypothalamus; olfactory tubercle; nucleus accumbens; deep cerebellar nuclei; anterior amygdaloid area; More reference expression data
BioGPS	n/a
Gene ontology
Molecular function	protein-macromolecule adaptor activity; cadherin binding; cytoskeletal protein binding; structural constituent of cytoskeleton; protein binding; spectrin binding; transmembrane transporter binding
Cellular component	cytoplasm; cytosol; Golgi apparatus; cell projection; lateral plasma membrane; membrane; bicellular tight junction; T-tubule; synapse; cell surface; axon; cell junction; basal plasma membrane; basolateral plasma membrane; endoplasmic reticulum; spectrin-associated cytoskeleton; sarcolemma; lysosome; costamere; cytoskeleton; dendrite; postsynaptic membrane; sarcoplasmic reticulum; neuron projection; neuromuscular junction; Z discdkac; plasma membrane; intercalated disc; node of Ranvier; axon initial segment
Biological process	regulation of potassium ion transport; positive regulation of membrane depolarization during cardiac muscle cell action potential; establishment of protein localization; mitotic cytokinesis; endoplasmic reticulum to Golgi vesicle-mediated transport; maintenance of protein location in plasma membrane; positive regulation of gene expression; positive regulation of sodium ion transport; positive regulation of sodium ion transmembrane transporter activity; positive regulation of membrane potential; plasma membrane organization; signal transduction; Golgi to plasma membrane protein transport; neuromuscular junction development; positive regulation of cell communication by electrical coupling; positive regulation of homotypic cell-cell adhesion; positive regulation of protein targeting to membrane; membrane assembly; positive regulation of cation channel activity; axonogenesis; magnesium ion homeostasis; neuronal action potential; cellular response to magnesium ion; protein localization to plasma membrane; negative regulation of delayed rectifier potassium channel activity; protein localization to axon
Sources:Amigo / QuickGO
Orthologs
Databases	NCBI: entry; OMA: entry
Species	Human	Mouse
Entrez	288	11735
Ensembl	ENSG00000151150	ENSMUSG00000069601
UniProt	Q12955	G5E8K5
RefSeq (mRNA)	NM_001149; NM_001204403; NM_001204404; NM_020987; NM_001320874	NM_009670; NM_146005; NM_170687; NM_170688; NM_170689 NM_170690; NM_170728; NM_170729; NM_170730
RefSeq (protein)	NP_001140; NP_001191332; NP_001191333; NP_001307803; NP_066267	NP_033800; NP_666117; NP_733788; NP_733789; NP_733790 NP_733791; NP_733924; NP_733925; NP_733926
Location (UCSC)	Chr 10: 60.03 – 60.73 Mb	Chr 10: 69.4 – 70.03 Mb
PubMed search
- Wikidata
View/Edit Human	View/Edit Mouse

Ankyrin-3 (ANK-3), also known as ankyrin-G, is a protein from ankyrin family that in humans is encoded by the ANK3 gene.

== Function ==
The protein encoded by this gene, ankyrin-3 is an immunologically distinct gene product from ankyrins ANK1 and ANK2, and was originally found at the axonal initial segment and nodes of Ranvier of neurons in the central and peripheral nervous systems. Alternatively spliced variants may be expressed in other tissues. Although multiple transcript variants encoding several different isoforms have been found for this gene, the full-length nature of only two have been characterized.

Within the nervous system, ankyrin-G is specifically localized to the neuromuscular junction, the axon initial segment and the Nodes of Ranvier. Within the nodes of Ranvier where action potentials are actively propagated, ankyrin-G has long been thought to be the intermediate binding partner to neurofascin and voltage-gated sodium channels. The genetic deletion of ankyrin-G from multiple neuron types has shown that ankyrin-G is required for the normal clustering of voltage-gated sodium channels at the axon hillock and for action potential firing.

== Disease linkage ==
The ANK3 protein associates with the cardiac sodium channel Na_{v}1.5 (SCN5A). Both proteins are highly expressed at ventricular intercalated disc and T-tubule membranes in cardiomyocytes. A mutation in the Na_{v}1.5 protein blocks interaction with ANK3 binding and therefore disrupts surface expression of Na_{v}1.5 in cardiomyocytes resulting in Brugada syndrome, a type of cardiac arrhythmia.

Other mutations in the ANK3 gene may be involved in the bipolar disorder and intellectual disability.

== Ankyrin family ==
The protein encoded by the ANK3 gene is a member of the ankyrin family of proteins that link the integral membrane proteins to the underlying spectrin-actin cytoskeleton. Ankyrins play key roles in activities such as cell motility, activation, proliferation, contact and the maintenance of specialized membrane domains. Most ankyrins are typically composed of three structural domains: an amino-terminal domain containing multiple ankyrin repeats; a central region with a highly conserved spectrin binding domain; and a carboxy-terminal regulatory domain which is the least conserved and subject to variation.
