= DCTN3 =

Protein-coding gene in the species Homo sapiens

Identifiers
- Aliases: DCTN3, DCTN-22, DCTN22, dynactin subunit 3
- External IDs: OMIM: 607387; MGI: 1859251; GeneCards: DCTN3

Gene location (Human)
| Chr. | Chromosome 9 (human) |
| Band | 9p13.3 | Start | 34,613,545 bp |
| Band | 9p13.3 | End | 34,620,523 bp |

Gene location (Mouse)
| Chr. | Chromosome 4 (mouse) |
| Band | 4|4 A5 | Start | 41,714,798 bp |
| Band | 4|4 A5 | End | 41,723,170 bp |
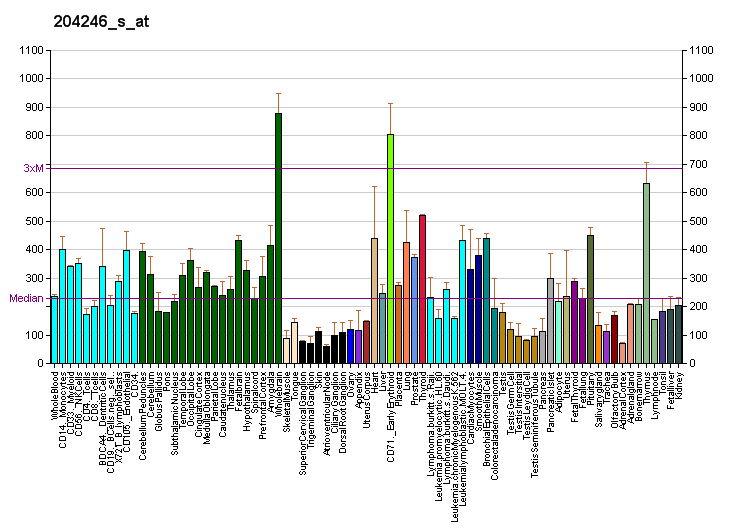
RNA expression pattern
| Bgee | Human / Mouse (ortholog); Top expressed in: ganglionic eminence; prefrontal cortex; ventricular zone; right frontal lobe; anterior pituitary; right hemisphere of cerebellum; Brodmann area 9; nucleus accumbens; muscle of thigh; skin of leg / Top expressed in: saccule; medial ganglionic eminence; otic vesicle; otic placode; superior frontal gyrus; facial motor nucleus; right kidney; primary visual cortex; motor neuron; choroid plexus of fourth ventricle; More reference expression data |
| BioGPS | More reference expression data |
Gene ontology
| Molecular function | structural molecule activity; protein binding |
| Cellular component | cytoplasm; centrosome; dynactin complex; spindle; chromosome; microtubule organizing center; microtubule associated complex; midbody; perinuclear region of cytoplasm; cleavage furrow; chromosome, centromeric region; cytoskeleton; kinetochore; nucleolus; cytosol; microtubule |
| Biological process | antigen processing and presentation of exogenous peptide antigen via MHC class II; cell division; endoplasmic reticulum to Golgi vesicle-mediated transport; G2/M transition of mitotic cell cycle; microtubule-based process; cell cycle; ciliary basal body-plasma membrane docking; mitotic cell cycle; regulation of G2/M transition of mitotic cell cycle; cytoskeleton-dependent cytokinesis |
Sources:Amigo / QuickGO
Orthologs
| Databases | NCBI: entry; OMA: entry |
| Species | Human | Mouse |
| Entrez | 11258 | 53598 |
| Ensembl | ENSG00000137100 | ENSMUSG00000028447 |
| UniProt | O75935 | Q9Z0Y1 |
| RefSeq (mRNA) | NM_024348; NM_001281425; NM_001281426; NM_001281427; NM_007234 | NM_001159565; NM_016890 |
| RefSeq (protein) | NP_001268354; NP_001268355; NP_001268356; NP_009165; NP_077324 | NP_001153037; NP_058586 |
| Location (UCSC) | Chr 9: 34.61 – 34.62 Mb | Chr 4: 41.71 – 41.72 Mb |
| PubMed search |
- Wikidata
| View/Edit Human | View/Edit Mouse |

Dynactin subunit 3 is a protein that in humans is encoded by the DCTN3 gene.

This gene encodes the smallest subunit of dynactin, a macromolecular complex consisting of 10 subunits ranging in size from 22 to 150 kD. Dynactin binds to both microtubules and cytoplasmic dynein. It is involved in a diverse array of cellular functions, including ER-to-Golgi transport, the centripetal movement of lysosomes and endosomes, spindle formation, cytokinesis, chromosome movement, nuclear positioning, and axonogenesis. This subunit, like most other dynactin subunits, exists only as a part of the dynactin complex. It is primarily an alpha-helical protein with very little coiled coil, and binds directly to the largest subunit (p150) of dynactin. Alternative splicing of this gene generates 2 transcript variants.
