= Ankyrin =

Protein family

ANK1, erythrocytic
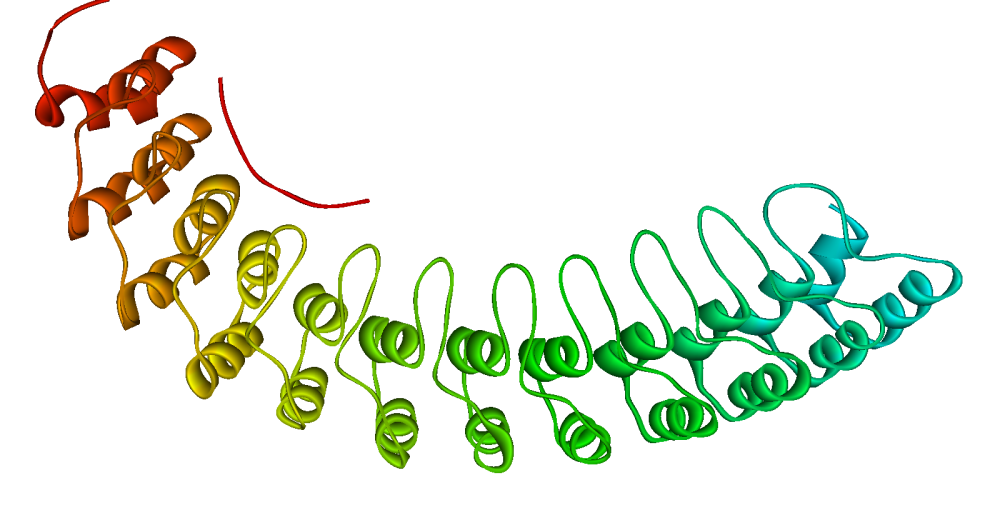
- Ribbon diagram of a fragment of the membrane-binding domain of ankyrin R.

Identifiers
- Symbol: ANK1
- Alt. symbols: AnkyrinR, Band2.1
- NCBI gene: 286
- HGNC: 492
- OMIM: 182900
- PDB: 1N11
- RefSeq: NM_000037
- UniProt: P16157

Other data
- Locus: Chr. 8 p21.1-11.2
Search for
- Structures: Swiss-model
- Domains: InterPro

Ankyrin repeat

Identifiers
- Symbol: Ank
- Pfam: PF00023
- InterPro: IPR002110
- SMART: SM00248
- PROSITE: PDOC50088
- SCOP2: 1awc / SCOPe / SUPFAM
Available protein structures:
- PDB: IPR002110 PF00023 (ECOD; PDBsum)
- AlphaFold: IPR002110; PF00023

ANK2, neuronal

Identifiers
- Symbol: ANK2
- Alt. symbols: AnkyrinB
- NCBI gene: 287
- HGNC: 493
- OMIM: 106410
- RefSeq: NM_001148
- UniProt: Q01484

Other data
- Locus: Chr. 4 q25-q27
Search for
- Structures: Swiss-model
- Domains: InterPro

ANK3, node of Ranvier

Identifiers
- Symbol: ANK3
- Alt. symbols: AnkyrinG
- NCBI gene: 288
- HGNC: 494
- OMIM: 600465
- RefSeq: NM_020987
- UniProt: Q12955

Other data
- Locus: Chr. 10 q21
Search for
- Structures: Swiss-model
- Domains: InterPro

Ankyrins are a family of proteins that mediate the attachment of integral membrane proteins to the spectrin-actin based membrane cytoskeleton. Ankyrins have binding sites for the beta subunit of spectrin and at least 12 families of integral membrane proteins. This linkage is required to maintain the integrity of the plasma membranes and to anchor specific ion channels, ion exchangers and ion transporters in the plasma membrane. The name is derived from the Greek word ἄγκυρα (ankyra) for "anchor".

== Structure ==
Ankyrins contain four functional domains: an N-terminal domain that contains 24 tandem ankyrin repeats, a central domain that binds to spectrin, a death domain that binds to proteins involved in apoptosis, and a C-terminal regulatory domain that is highly variable between different ankyrin proteins.

== Membrane protein recognition ==
The 24 tandem ankyrin repeats are responsible for the recognition of a wide range of membrane proteins. These 24 repeats contain 3 structurally distinct binding sites ranging from repeat 1-14. These binding sites are quasi-independent of each other and can be used in combination. The interactions the sites use to bind to membrane proteins are non-specific and consist of: hydrogen bonding, hydrophobic interactions and electrostatic interactions. These non-specific interactions give ankyrin the property to recognise a large range of proteins as the sequence doesn't have to be conserved, just the properties of the amino acids. The quasi-independence means that if a binding site is not used, it won't have a large effect on the overall binding. These two properties in combination give rise to large repertoire of proteins ankyrin can recognise.

== Subtypes ==
Ankyrins are encoded by three genes (ANK1, ANK2 and ANK3) in mammals. Each gene in turn produces multiple proteins through alternative splicing.

=== ANK1 ===
The ANK1 gene encodes the AnkyrinR proteins. AnkyrinR was first characterized in human erythrocytes, where this ankyrin was referred to as erythrocyte ankyrin or band2.1. AnkyrinR enables erythrocytes to resist shear forces experienced in the circulation. Individuals with reduced or defective ankyrinR have a form of hemolytic anemia termed hereditary spherocytosis. In erythrocytes, AnkyrinR links the membrane skeleton to the Cl^{−}/HCO_{3}^{−} anion exchanger.

Ankyrin 1 links membrane receptor CD44 to the inositol triphosphate receptor and the cytoskeleton.

It has been suggested that Ankyrin 1 interacts with KAHRP (shown via selective pull-downs, SPR and ELISA).

=== ANK2 ===
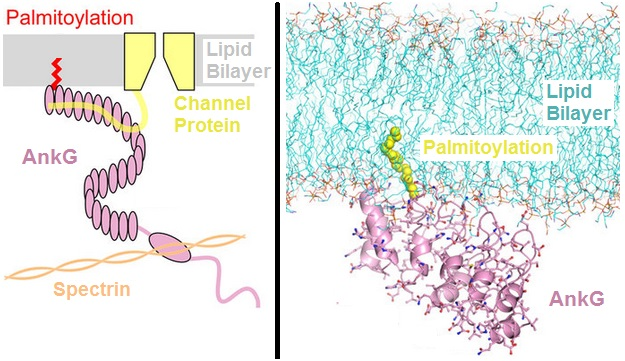
Left Palmitoylation (red) anchors Ankyrin G to the plasma membrane. Right Close up. Palmitoyl residue in yellow.

Subsequently, ankyrinB proteins (products of the ANK2 gene) were identified in brain and muscle. AnkyrinB and AnkyrinG proteins are required for the polarized distribution of many membrane proteins including the Na^{+}/K^{+} ATPase, the voltage gated Na^{+} channel and the Na^{+}/Ca^{2+} exchanger.

=== ANK3 ===
AnkyrinG proteins (products of the ANK3 gene) were identified in epithelial cells and neurons. A large-scale genetic analysis conducted in 2008 shows the possibility that ANK3 is involved in bipolar disorder.

== See also ==
- DARPin (designed ankyrin repeat protein), an engineered antibody mimetic based on the structure of ankyrin repeats
