= RAB6A =

Protein-coding gene in the species Homo sapiens

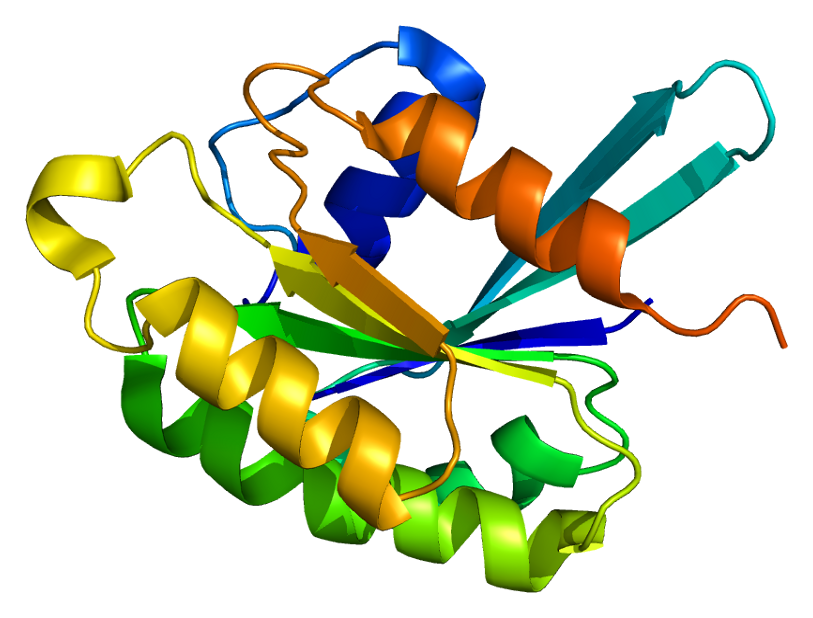

Identifiers
- Aliases: RAB6A, RAB6, member RAS oncogene family
- External IDs: OMIM: 179513; MGI: 894313; GeneCards: RAB6A
Available structures
PDB	Ortholog search: PDBe RCSB
PDB	List of PDB id codes 1YZQ, 2GIL, 3BBP, 3CWZ, 4DKX
Enzyme activity
EC #	BRENDA	ExPASy	KEGG	MetaCyc
3.6.5.2	↗	↗	↗	↗

Gene location (Human)
Chr.	Chromosome 11 (human)
Band	11q13.4	Start	73,675,638 bp
Band	11q13.4	End	73,761,137 bp

Gene location (Mouse)
Chr.	Chromosome 7 (mouse)
Band	7|7 E2	Start	100,256,617 bp
Band	7|7 E2	End	100,290,475 bp
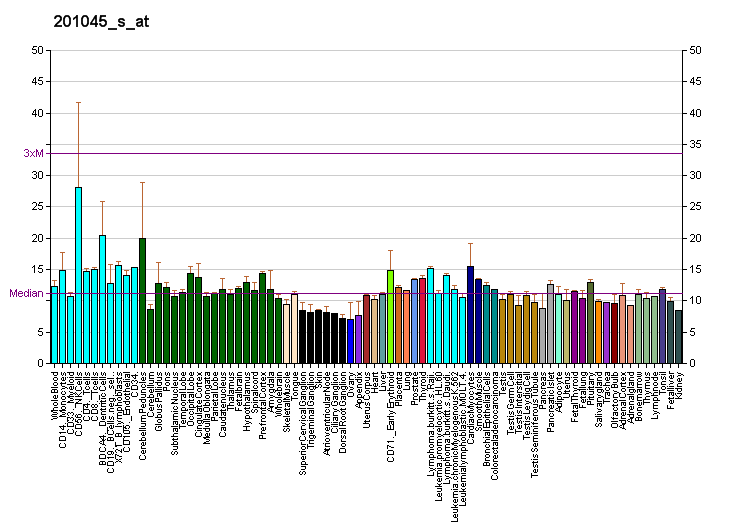

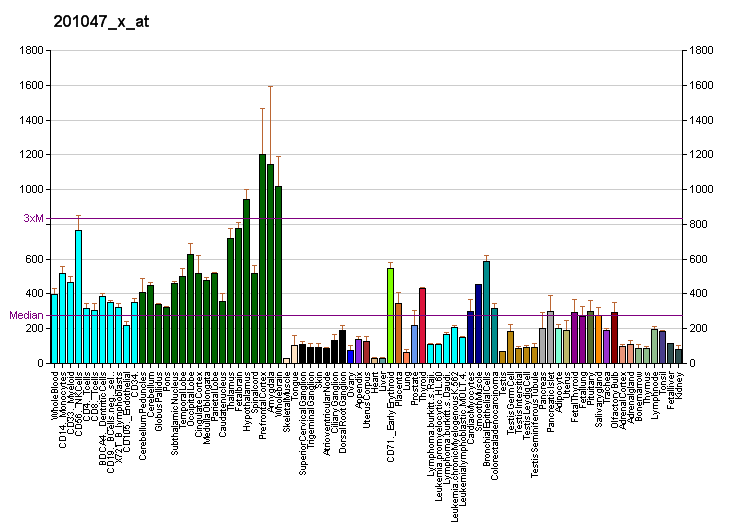

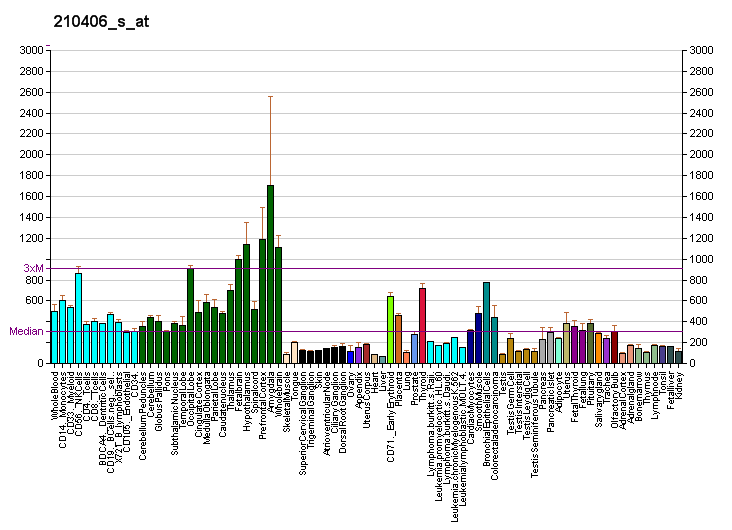
RNA expression pattern
Bgee	Human / Mouse (ortholog); Top expressed in: Achilles tendon; anterior cingulate cortex; ganglionic eminence; ventricular zone; Brodmann area 10; epithelium of colon; frontal pole; C1 segment; right frontal lobe; stromal cell of endometrium / Top expressed in: primary motor cortex; prefrontal cortex; cingulate gyrus; anterior amygdaloid area; lateral geniculate nucleus; lateral septal nucleus; medial dorsal nucleus; ventral tegmental area; hippocampus proper; dentate gyrus of hippocampal formation granule cell; More reference expression data
BioGPS	More reference expression data
Gene ontology
Molecular function	nucleotide binding; protein domain specific binding; GTP binding; myosin V binding; protein binding; GTPase activity
Cellular component	Golgi apparatus; membrane; endosome to plasma membrane transport vesicle; trans-Golgi network; extracellular exosome; cytoplasmic vesicle; trans-Golgi network membrane; cytosol; endoplasmic reticulum membrane; Golgi membrane; plasma membrane; secretory granule membrane
Biological process	antigen processing and presentation; early endosome to Golgi transport; peptidyl-cysteine methylation; protein localization to Golgi apparatus; protein transport; minus-end-directed organelle transport along microtubule; viral process; vesicle-mediated transport; retrograde vesicle-mediated transport, Golgi to endoplasmic reticulum; neutrophil degranulation; transport; intracellular protein transport; intra-Golgi vesicle-mediated transport; Rab protein signal transduction; retrograde transport, endosome to Golgi
Sources:Amigo / QuickGO
Orthologs
Databases	NCBI: entry; OMA: entry
Species	Human	Mouse
Entrez	5870	19346
Ensembl	ENSG00000175582	ENSMUSG00000030704
UniProt	P20340	P35279
RefSeq (mRNA)	NM_198896; NM_001243718; NM_001243719; NM_002869	NM_001163663; NM_024287
RefSeq (protein)	NP_001230647; NP_001230648; NP_002860; NP_942599	NP_001157135; NP_077249
Location (UCSC)	Chr 11: 73.68 – 73.76 Mb	Chr 7: 100.26 – 100.29 Mb
PubMed search
- Wikidata
View/Edit Human	View/Edit Mouse

Ras-related protein Rab-6A is a protein that in humans is encoded by the RAB6A gene located in the eleventh chromosome. Its main function is the regulation of protein transport from the Golgi complex to the endoplasmic reticulum and the exocytosis along with the microtubules.

== Interactions ==
RAB6A has been shown to interact with:

- BICD1,
- DCTN1
- ERC1, and
- KIF20A.
