= BICD1 =

Protein-coding gene in humans

Available structures
PDB	Ortholog search: PDBe RCSB
PDB	List of PDB id codes 4YTD

Identifiers
- Aliases: BICD1, BICD, BICD cargo adaptor 1, bic-D 1
- External IDs: OMIM: 602204; MGI: 1101760; HomoloGene: 37518; GeneCards: BICD1; OMA:BICD1 - orthologs

Gene location (Human)
Chr.	Chromosome 12 (human)
Band	12p11.21	Start	32,106,835 bp
Band	12p11.21	End	32,383,633 bp

Gene location (Mouse)
Chr.	Chromosome 6 (mouse)
Band	6|6 G3	Start	149,310,384 bp
Band	6|6 G3	End	149,464,827 bp
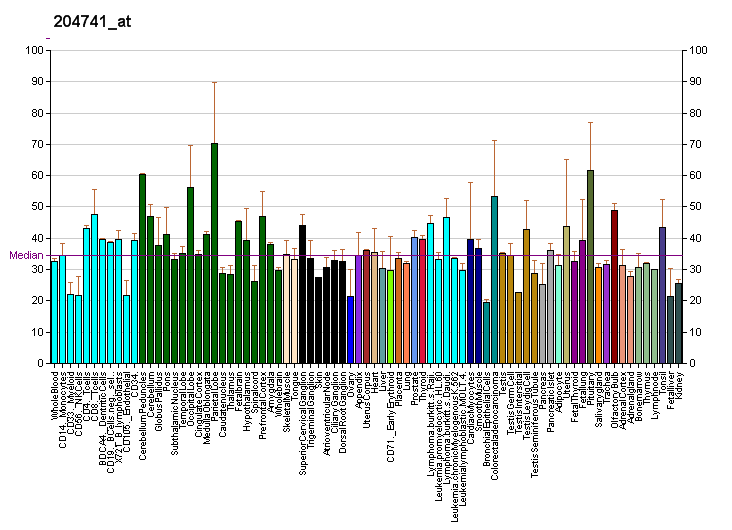
RNA expression pattern
Bgee	Human / Mouse (ortholog); Top expressed in: ventricular zone; sural nerve; ganglionic eminence; cerebellar vermis; right uterine tube; caput epididymis; trigeminal ganglion; spinal ganglia; left ovary; paraflocculus of cerebellum / Top expressed in: sciatic nerve; mammillary body; ventromedial nucleus; lateral septal nucleus; lateral hypothalamus; substantia nigra; lobe of cerebellum; lateral geniculate nucleus; ventral tegmental area; habenula; More reference expression data
BioGPS	More reference expression data
Gene ontology
Molecular function	dynactin binding; structural constituent of cytoskeleton; proteinase activated receptor binding; protein binding; cytoskeletal anchor activity; dynein complex binding; protein kinase binding; dynein intermediate chain binding
Cellular component	Golgi apparatus; membrane; host cell viral assembly compartment; trans-Golgi network; tubulin complex; perinuclear region of cytoplasm; cytoplasmic microtubule; cytoskeleton; cytoplasmic vesicle; cytosol; centrosome
Biological process	protein localization to organelle; regulation of proteinase activated receptor activity; positive regulation of receptor-mediated endocytosis; RNA processing; microtubule anchoring at microtubule organizing center; negative regulation of phospholipase C-activating G protein-coupled receptor signaling pathway; negative regulation of phospholipase C activity; anatomical structure morphogenesis; intracellular mRNA localization; minus-end-directed organelle transport along microtubule; viral process; stress granule assembly; transport; regulation of microtubule cytoskeleton organization; positive regulation of protein localization to centrosome
Sources:Amigo / QuickGO
Orthologs
Species	Human	Mouse
Entrez	636	12121
Ensembl	ENSG00000151746	ENSMUSG00000003452
UniProt	Q96G01	Q8BR07
RefSeq (mRNA)	NM_001003398; NM_001714; NM_001354186; NM_001354187; NM_001354188 NM_001354189; NM_001363603	NM_001112796; NM_009753
RefSeq (protein)	NP_001003398; NP_001705; NP_001341115; NP_001341116; NP_001341117 NP_001341118; NP_001350532	NP_001106267; NP_033883
Location (UCSC)	Chr 12: 32.11 – 32.38 Mb	Chr 6: 149.31 – 149.46 Mb
PubMed search
- Wikidata
View/Edit Human	View/Edit Mouse

Bicaudal D cargo adaptor 1 is a protein that in humans is encoded by the BICD1 gene.

== Function ==
This gene is one of two human homologs of Drosophila bicaudal-D. It has been implicated in COPI-independent membrane transport from the Golgi apparatus to the endoplasmic reticulum. Two alternative splice variants have been described. Other alternative splice variants that encode different protein isoforms have been described but their full-length nature has not been determined.

== Interactions ==
BICD1 has been shown to interact with RAB6A.
