= MARCKSL1 =

Protein-coding gene in humans

Identifiers
- Aliases: MARCKSL1, F52, MACMARCKS, MLP, MLP1, MRP, MARCKS-like 1, MARCKS like 1
- External IDs: OMIM: 602940; MGI: 97143; GeneCards: MARCKSL1

Gene location (Human)
Chr.	Chromosome 1 (human)
Band	1p35.1	Start	32,333,839 bp
Band	1p35.1	End	32,336,233 bp

Gene location (Mouse)
Chr.	Chromosome 4 (mouse)
Band	4 D2.2|4 63.26 cM	Start	129,407,374 bp
Band	4 D2.2|4 63.26 cM	End	129,409,778 bp
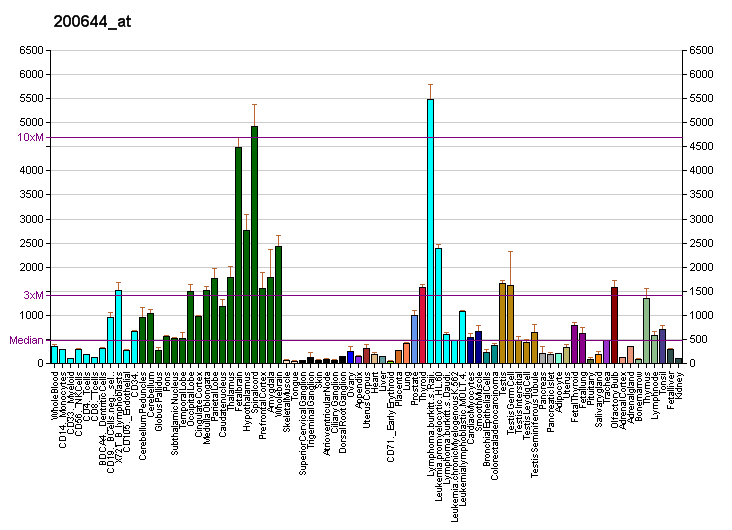
RNA expression pattern
Bgee	Human / Mouse (ortholog); Top expressed in: inferior ganglion of vagus nerve; ganglionic eminence; spinal cord; C1 segment; superior vestibular nucleus; middle frontal gyrus; subthalamic nucleus; pons; ventricular zone; ventral tegmental area / Top expressed in: neural tube; maxillary prominence; medial ganglionic eminence; mandibular prominence; somite; abdominal wall; ventricular zone; primitive streak; transitional epithelium of urinary bladder; vestibular sensory epithelium; More reference expression data
BioGPS	More reference expression data
Gene ontology
Molecular function	actin binding; protein binding; calmodulin binding
Cellular component	cytoplasm; plasma membrane; extracellular exosome; membrane; cytoskeleton
Biological process	positive regulation of cell population proliferation
Sources:Amigo / QuickGO
Orthologs
Databases	NCBI: entry; OMA: entry
Species	Human	Mouse
Entrez	65108	17357
Ensembl	ENSG00000175130	ENSMUSG00000047945
UniProt	P49006	P28667
RefSeq (mRNA)	NM_023009	NM_010807
RefSeq (protein)	NP_075385	NP_034937
Location (UCSC)	Chr 1: 32.33 – 32.34 Mb	Chr 4: 129.41 – 129.41 Mb
PubMed search
- Wikidata
View/Edit Human	View/Edit Mouse

MARCKS-related protein is a protein that in humans is encoded by the MARCKSL1 gene.

== Function ==
This gene encodes a member of the myristoylated alanine-rich C-kinase substrate (MARCKS) family. MARCKS plays a role in cytoskeletal regulation, protein kinase C signaling and calmodulin signaling. The encoded protein affects the formation of adherens junctions. Alternative splicing results in multiple transcript variants.

== Interactions ==
MARCKSL1 has been shown to interact with DCTN2 and JNK.
