= KIF20A =

Protein-coding gene in the species Homo sapiens

Identifiers
- Aliases: KIF20A, MKLP2, RAB6KIFL, kinesin family member 20A, RCM6
- External IDs: OMIM: 605664; MGI: 1201682; GeneCards: KIF20A

Gene location (Human)
| Chr. | Chromosome 5 (human) |
| Band | 5q31.2 | Start | 138,178,719 bp |
| Band | 5q31.2 | End | 138,187,723 bp |

Gene location (Mouse)
| Chr. | Chromosome 18 (mouse) |
| Band | 18 B1|18 18.69 cM | Start | 34,757,666 bp |
| Band | 18 B1|18 18.69 cM | End | 34,766,330 bp |
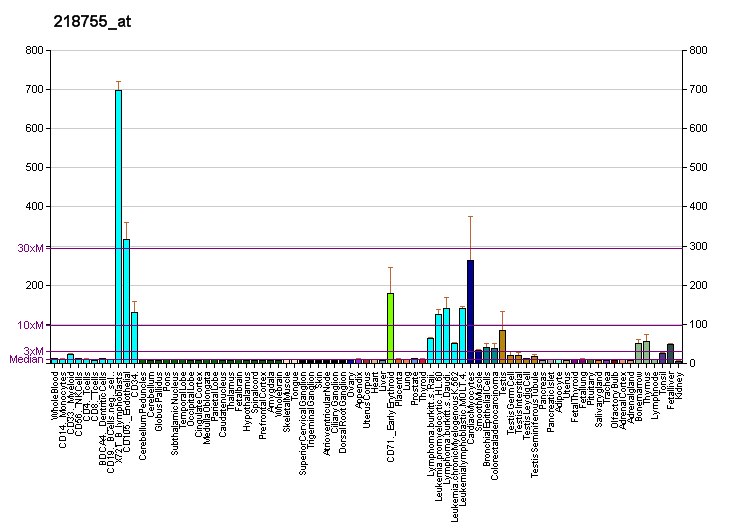
RNA expression pattern
| Bgee | Human / Mouse (ortholog); Top expressed in: ventricular zone; gonad; oocyte; embryo; secondary oocyte; ganglionic eminence; testicle; stromal cell of endometrium; bone marrow; trabecular bone / Top expressed in: genital tubercle; spermatocyte; primitive streak; epiblast; abdominal wall; tail of embryo; maxillary prominence; mandibular prominence; zygote; somite; More reference expression data |
| BioGPS | More reference expression data |
Gene ontology
| Molecular function | microtubule motor activity; nucleotide binding; transporter activity; microtubule binding; ATPase activity; protein binding; ATP binding; protein kinase binding |
| Cellular component | cytoplasm; Golgi apparatus; kinesin complex; spindle; midbody; microtubule; cytoskeleton; nucleoplasm; cleavage furrow; intercellular bridge; nucleus |
| Biological process | mitotic cytokinesis; microtubule-based movement; microtubule bundle formation; protein transport; septum digestion after cytokinesis; vesicle-mediated transport; cytokinesis; regulation of cytokinesis; midbody abscission |
Sources:Amigo / QuickGO
Orthologs
| Databases | NCBI: entry; OMA: entry |
| Species | Human | Mouse |
| Entrez | 10112 | 19348 |
| Ensembl | ENSG00000112984 | ENSMUSG00000003779 |
| UniProt | O95235 | P97329 |
| RefSeq (mRNA) | NM_005733 | NM_001166406; NM_001166407; NM_009004 |
| RefSeq (protein) | NP_005724 | NP_001159878; NP_001159879; NP_033030 |
| Location (UCSC) | Chr 5: 138.18 – 138.19 Mb | Chr 18: 34.76 – 34.77 Mb |
| PubMed search |
- Wikidata
| View/Edit Human | View/Edit Mouse |

Kinesin-like protein KIF20A is a protein that in humans is encoded by the KIF20A gene.

== Interactions ==
KIF20A has been shown to interact with RAB6A.
