= Obscurin =

Protein found in humans

OBSCN
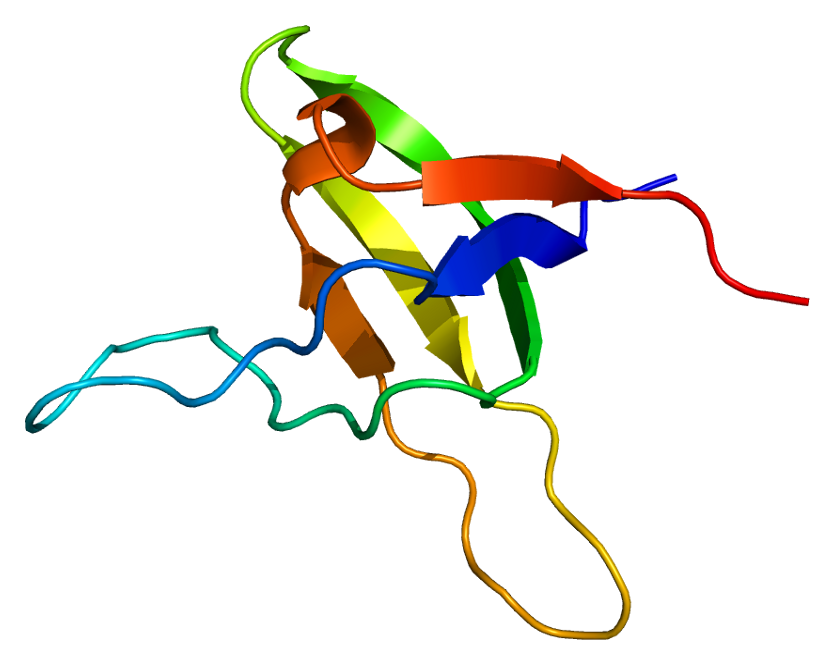

Identifiers
- Aliases: OBSCN, ARHGEF30, UNC89, obscurin, cytoskeletal calmodulin and titin-interacting RhoGEF
- External IDs: OMIM: 608616; MGI: 2681862; GeneCards: OBSCN
Available structures
PDB	Ortholog search: PDBe RCSB
PDB	List of PDB id codes 1V1C, 2CR6, 2DKU, 2DM7, 2E7B, 2EDF, 2EDH, 2EDL, 2EDQ, 2EDR, 2EDT, 2EDW, 2ENY, 2EO1, 2GQH, 2YZ8, 4C4K, 2MWC, 4RSV, 2N56
Enzyme activity
EC #	BRENDA	ExPASy	KEGG	MetaCyc
2.7.11.1	↗	↗	↗	↗

Gene location (Human)
Chr.	Chromosome 1 (human)
Band	1q42.13	Start	228,208,044 bp
Band	1q42.13	End	228,378,876 bp

Gene location (Mouse)
Chr.	Chromosome 11 (mouse)
Band	11|11 B1.3	Start	58,885,082 bp
Band	11|11 B1.3	End	59,029,996 bp
RNA expression pattern
Bgee	Human / Mouse (ortholog); Top expressed in: muscle of thigh; apex of heart; gastrocnemius muscle; Skeletal muscle tissue of rectus abdominis; right auricle of heart; left ventricle; body of tongue; biceps brachii; Skeletal muscle tissue of biceps brachii; right hemisphere of cerebellum / Top expressed in: muscle of thigh; myocardium of ventricle; knee joint; skeletal muscle tissue; interventricular septum; triceps brachii muscle; quadriceps femoris muscle; temporal muscle; digastric muscle; extraocular muscle; More reference expression data
BioGPS	n/a
Gene ontology
Molecular function	ankyrin binding; metal ion binding; nucleotide binding; protein kinase activity; transferase activity; protein serine/threonine kinase activity; kinase activity; structural constituent of muscle; calmodulin binding; ATP binding; titin binding; protein binding; guanyl-nucleotide exchange factor activity; phosphatidylinositol-4,5-bisphosphate binding; phosphatidylinositol-3,4,5-trisphosphate binding; phosphatidylinositol-5-phosphate binding; phosphatidylinositol-3-phosphate binding; phosphatidylinositol-3,4-bisphosphate binding; phosphatidylinositol-4-phosphate binding; lipid binding
Cellular component	cytoplasm; myofibril; M band; Z discdkac; cytosol; nuclear body; nucleus; plasma membrane; membrane; sarcolemma
Biological process	sarcomere organization; regulation of Rho protein signal transduction; multicellular organism development; positive regulation of apoptotic process; protein phosphorylation; protein localization to M-band; regulation of small GTPase mediated signal transduction; cell differentiation; phosphorylation; G protein-coupled receptor signaling pathway
Sources:Amigo / QuickGO
Orthologs
Databases	NCBI: entry; OMA: entry
Species	Human	Mouse
Entrez	84033	380698
Ensembl	ENSG00000154358	ENSMUSG00000061462
UniProt	Q5VST9	A2AAJ9
RefSeq (mRNA)	NM_001098623; NM_001271223; NM_052843; NM_001386125	NM_001171512; NM_199152
RefSeq (protein)	NP_001092093; NP_001258152; NP_443075	NP_001164983; NP_954603
Location (UCSC)	Chr 1: 228.21 – 228.38 Mb	Chr 11: 58.89 – 59.03 Mb
PubMed search
- Wikidata
View/Edit Human	View/Edit Mouse

Obscurin is a protein that in humans is encoded by the OBSCN gene. Obscurin belongs to the family of giant sarcomeric signaling proteins that includes titin and nebulin. Obscurin is expressed in cardiac and skeletal muscle, and plays a role in the organization of myofibrils during sarcomere assembly. A mutation in the OBSCN gene has been associated with hypertrophic cardiomyopathy and altered obscurin protein properties have been associated with other muscle diseases.

== Structure ==
Human obscurin may exist as multiple splice variants of approximately 720 kDa, however the full-length nature of only one has been described to date. Obscurin is expressed in cardiac and skeletal muscle. The obscurin gene spans more than 150 kb, contains over 80 exons. The encoded protein contains 68 Ig domains, 2 fibronectin domains, 1 IQ calmodulin-binding motif, 1 RhoGEF domain with an associated PH domain, and 2 serine-threonine kinase domains. The dominant location of obscurin in mature myofibrils is at the sarcomeric M-band. Titin, obscurin, obscurin-like-1 and myomesin form a ternary complex at sarcomeric M-bands that is critical for sarcomere mechanics.

== Function ==
Obscurin belongs to the family of giant sarcomeric signaling proteins that includes titin and nebulin, and may have a role in the organization of myofibrils during assembly and may mediate interactions between the sarcoplasmic reticulum and myofibrils. Obscurin is the major cytoplasmic ligand for small ankyrin 1 (sANK1), a sarcoplasmic reticular protein, and the scaffolding function of obscurin appears to prevent degradation of sANK1. These data indicate that obscurin serves as a signaling link between the sarcomeric and sarcoplasmic reticular domains, Obscurin plays a role in the formation of new sarcomeres during myofibril assembly. specifically, at the sarcomeric periphery where sites of initiation and progression of myofibrilogenesis lie. Obscurin appears to be necessary for the proper incorporation of myosin filaments into sarcomeres and in the assembly of A-bands. Moreover, the kinase domains of obscurin are enzymatically active and appear to be involved in the regulation of cell adhesion.

== Clinical significance ==
Obscurin has been shown to exhibit a disease-related isoform switch in patients with dilated cardiomyopathy. An obscurin mutation Arg4344Gln was identified in patients with hypertrophic cardiomyopathy, which disrupted binding of obscurin to the Z9-Z10 domains of titin. A later study, however, was not able to reproduce this effect. Due to lack of mechanistic evidence and the high prevalence among African Americans, the Arg4344Gln variant is currently not considered to be pathogenic. Mutations found the gene encoding titin in patients with limb-girdle muscular dystrophy 2J or Salih myopathy decrease the ability of titin to bind obscurin, suggesting that this may be causative in disease manifestation.

== Interactions ==
Obscurin has been shown to interact with Titin, specifically, with the Novex-3 of Titin, a 6.5 kb exon located upstream of the cardiac-specific N2B exon. The C-terminal region of Obscurin interacts with the cytoplasmic domain of small ankyrin 1 and with the exon 43' region of ankyrin B. The Ig3 of obscurin binds myomesin at the linker between My4 and My5.
