= CEP72 =

Protein-coding gene in the species Homo sapiens

Identifiers
- Aliases: CEP72, centrosomal protein 72
- External IDs: OMIM: 616475; MGI: 1921720; GeneCards: CEP72

Gene location (Human)
Chr.	Chromosome 5 (human)
Band	5p15.33	Start	612,340 bp
Band	5p15.33	End	667,168 bp

Gene location (Mouse)
Chr.	Chromosome 13 (mouse)
Band	13|13 C1	Start	74,184,619 bp
Band	13|13 C1	End	74,210,418 bp
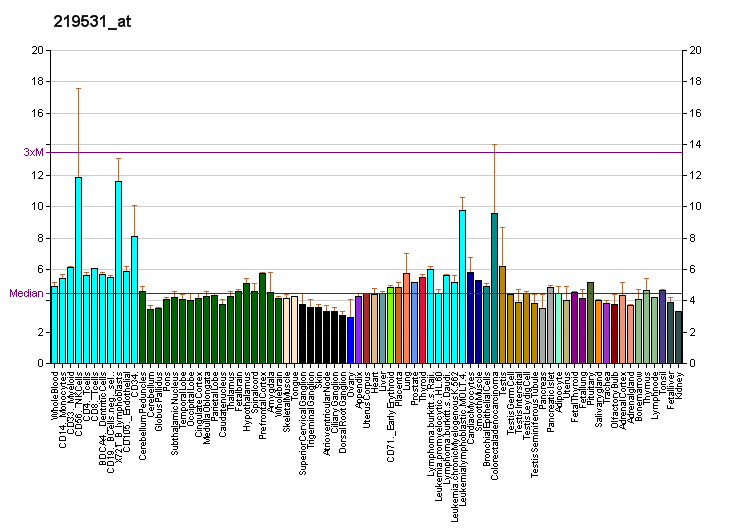
RNA expression pattern
Bgee	Human / Mouse (ortholog); Top expressed in: gonad; testicle; ventricular zone; cerebellar hemisphere; right hemisphere of cerebellum; left testis; right testis; ganglionic eminence; sural nerve; right frontal lobe / Top expressed in: spermatocyte; spermatid; seminiferous tubule; genital tubercle; otic vesicle; tail of embryo; ventricular zone; epiblast; morula; embryo; More reference expression data
BioGPS	More reference expression data
Gene ontology
Molecular function	protein binding; identical protein binding
Cellular component	cytoplasm; microtubule organizing center; cytosol; centrosome; centriolar satellite; cytoskeleton
Biological process	gamma-tubulin complex localization; centriole replication; spindle organization; G2/M transition of mitotic cell cycle; regulation of protein localization to centrosome; ciliary basal body-plasma membrane docking; regulation of G2/M transition of mitotic cell cycle
Sources:Amigo / QuickGO
Orthologs
Databases	NCBI: entry; OMA: entry
Species	Human	Mouse
Entrez	55722	74470
Ensembl	ENSG00000280688; ENSG00000112877	ENSMUSG00000021572
UniProt	Q9P209	Q9D3R3
RefSeq (mRNA)	NM_018140	NM_028959
RefSeq (protein)	NP_060610	NP_083235
Location (UCSC)	Chr 5: 0.61 – 0.67 Mb	Chr 13: 74.18 – 74.21 Mb
PubMed search
- Wikidata
View/Edit Human	View/Edit Mouse

Centrosomal protein of 72 kDa is a protein that in humans is encoded by the CEP72 gene.

The product of this gene is a member of the Leucine-rich repeat (LRR) superfamily of proteins. The protein is localized to the centrosome, a non-membraneous organelle that functions as the major microtubule-organizing center in animal cells.
