= ERC1 =

Protein-coding gene in the species Homo sapiens

Identifiers
- Aliases: ERC1, Cast2, ELKS, ERC-1, RAB6IP2, ELKS/RAB6-interacting/CAST family member 1
- External IDs: OMIM: 607127; MGI: 2151013; GeneCards: ERC1

Gene location (Human)
Chr.	Chromosome 12 (human)
Band	12p13.33	Start	990,509 bp
Band	12p13.33	End	1,495,933 bp

Gene location (Mouse)
Chr.	Chromosome 6 (mouse)
Band	6|6 F1	Start	119,570,796 bp
Band	6|6 F1	End	119,848,167 bp
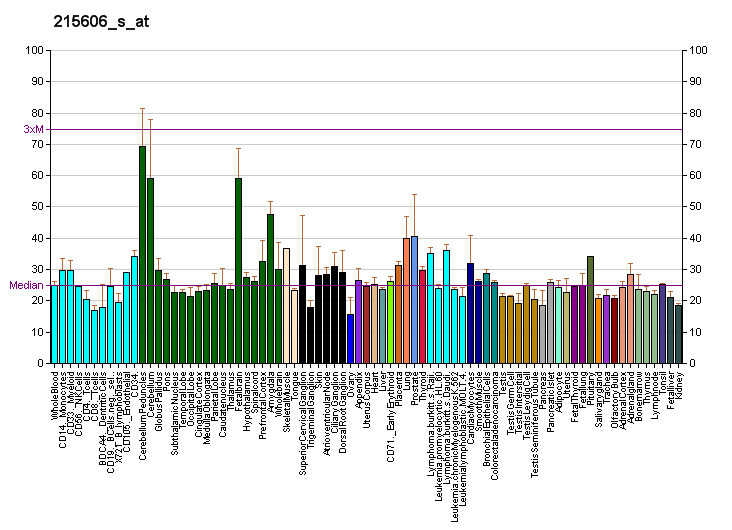
RNA expression pattern
Bgee	Human / Mouse (ortholog); Top expressed in: sural nerve; epithelium of colon; Achilles tendon; testicle; cerebellar vermis; saphenous vein; stromal cell of endometrium; ganglionic eminence; cerebellar hemisphere; corpus callosum / Top expressed in: genital tubercle; tail of embryo; lumbar spinal ganglion; zygote; dentate gyrus of hippocampal formation granule cell; Rostral migratory stream; cumulus cell; stria vascularis; cerebellum; tibiofemoral joint; More reference expression data
BioGPS	More reference expression data
Gene ontology
Molecular function	leucine zipper domain binding; protein binding; PDZ domain binding; cadherin binding
Cellular component	cytoplasm; presynaptic active zone; Golgi membrane; Golgi apparatus; synapse; IkappaB kinase complex; presynaptic membrane; membrane; centrosome; ciliary basal body; microtubule organizing center; cytoskeleton
Biological process	multicellular organism development; protein transport; retrograde transport, endosome to Golgi; regulation of transcription, DNA-templated; I-kappaB phosphorylation; positive regulation of NF-kappaB transcription factor activity; negative regulation of apoptotic process
Sources:Amigo / QuickGO
Orthologs
Databases	NCBI: entry; OMA: entry
Species	Human	Mouse
Entrez	23085	111173
Ensembl	ENSG00000082805	ENSMUSG00000030172
UniProt	Q8IUD2	Q99MI1
RefSeq (mRNA)	NM_001301248; NM_178039; NM_178040	NM_053204; NM_178085
RefSeq (protein)	NP_001288177; NP_829883; NP_829884	NP_444434; NP_835186
Location (UCSC)	Chr 12: 0.99 – 1.5 Mb	Chr 6: 119.57 – 119.85 Mb
PubMed search
- Wikidata
View/Edit Human	View/Edit Mouse

ELKS/RAB6-interacting/CAST family member 1 is a protein that in humans is encoded by the ERC1 gene. The name ELKS is derived from "protein rich in the amino acids E, L, K and S"

The protein encoded by this gene is a member of a family of RIM-binding proteins. RIMs are active zone proteins that regulate neurotransmitter release. This gene has been found fused to the receptor-type tyrosine kinase gene RET by gene rearrangement due to the translocation t(10;12)(q11;p13). Multiple transcript variants encoding different isoforms have been found for this gene. ELKS has been reported to direct vesicles with RAB6A to melanosomes.

== Interactions ==
ERC1 has been shown to interact with RAB6A.
