= SPTBN2 =

Protein-coding gene in the species Homo sapiens

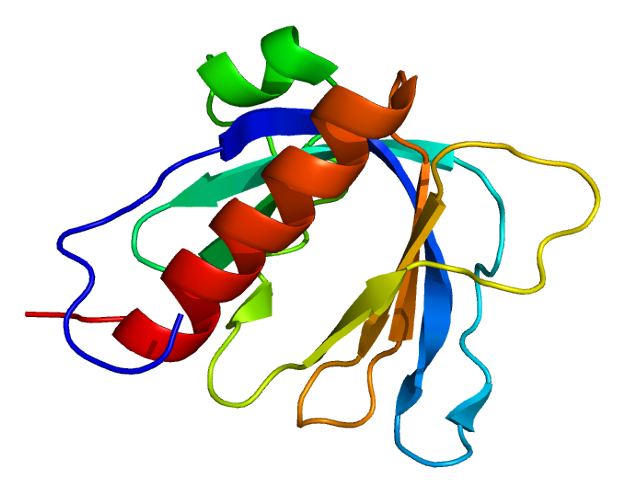

Identifiers
- Aliases: SPTBN2, GTRAP41, SCA5, SCAR14, spectrin beta, non-erythrocytic 2
- External IDs: OMIM: 604985; MGI: 1313261; GeneCards: SPTBN2
Available structures
| PDB | Ortholog search: PDBe RCSB |
| PDB | List of PDB id codes 1WJM, 1WYQ |

Gene location (Human)
| Chr. | Chromosome 11 (human) |
| Band | 11q13.2 | Start | 66,682,497 bp |
| Band | 11q13.2 | End | 66,744,670 bp |

Gene location (Mouse)
| Chr. | Chromosome 19 (mouse) |
| Band | 19 A|19 4.1 cM | Start | 4,761,195 bp |
| Band | 19 A|19 4.1 cM | End | 4,802,388 bp |
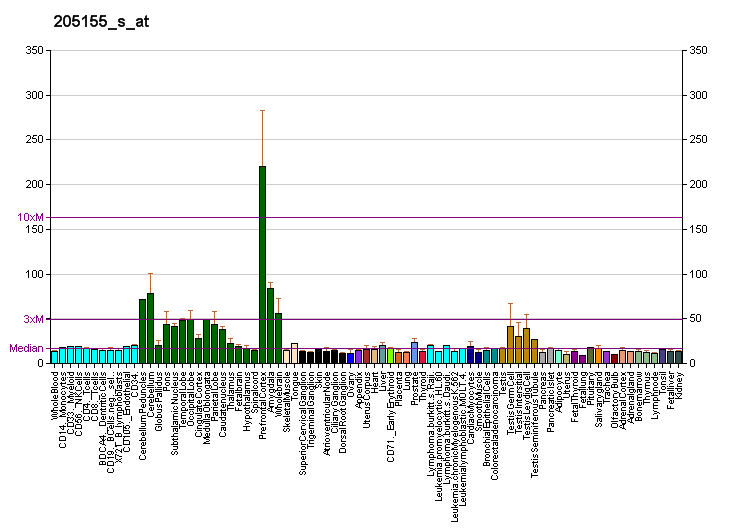
RNA expression pattern
| Bgee | Human / Mouse (ortholog); Top expressed in: right hemisphere of cerebellum; right frontal lobe; skin of leg; skin of abdomen; ganglionic eminence; prefrontal cortex; right testis; left testis; cingulate gyrus; anterior cingulate cortex / Top expressed in: perirhinal cortex; CA3 field; entorhinal cortex; superior frontal gyrus; primary visual cortex; dentate gyrus of hippocampal formation granule cell; Region I of hippocampus proper; primary motor cortex; cerebellar cortex; prefrontal cortex; More reference expression data |
| BioGPS | More reference expression data |
Gene ontology
| Molecular function | actin binding; phospholipid binding; structural constituent of cytoskeleton; cadherin binding; structural constituent of synapse |
| Cellular component | cell junction; soma; cell cortex; apical plasma membrane; cytoskeleton; spectrin; extracellular space; cytoplasm; cytosol; parallel fiber to Purkinje cell synapse; presynapse; glutamatergic synapse; postsynaptic spectrin-associated cytoskeleton |
| Biological process | antigen processing and presentation of exogenous peptide antigen via MHC class II; multicellular organism growth; MAPK cascade; axon guidance; cerebellar Purkinje cell layer morphogenesis; endoplasmic reticulum to Golgi vesicle-mediated transport; adult behavior; actin filament capping; synapse assembly; vesicle-mediated transport; cytoskeleton organization; regulation of molecular function; postsynapse organization |
Sources:Amigo / QuickGO
Orthologs
| Databases | NCBI: entry; OMA: entry |
| Species | Human | Mouse |
| Entrez | 6712 | 20743 |
| Ensembl | ENSG00000173898 | ENSMUSG00000067889 |
| UniProt | O15020 | Q68FG2 |
| RefSeq (mRNA) | NM_006946 | NM_021287 |
| RefSeq (protein) | NP_008877 | NP_067262 |
| Location (UCSC) | Chr 11: 66.68 – 66.74 Mb | Chr 19: 4.76 – 4.8 Mb |
| PubMed search |
- Wikidata
| View/Edit Human | View/Edit Mouse |

Spectrin beta chain, brain 2 is a protein that in humans is encoded by the SPTBN2 gene.

== Clinical significance ==
Mutations in this gene is associated with Spinocerebellar ataxia type 5.

== Interactions ==
SPTBN2 has been shown to interact with:

- ACTR1A,
- Beta-actin, and
- UNC13B.
