= Actin related protein 10 homolog =

Protein-coding gene in the species Homo sapiens

ACTR10

Identifiers
- Aliases: ACTR10, ACTR11, Arp11, HARP11, Arp10, actin-related protein 10 homolog, actin related protein 10 homolog, actin related protein 10
- External IDs: MGI: 1891654; GeneCards: ACTR10

Gene location (Human)
| Chr. | Chromosome 14 (human) |
| Band | 14q23.1 | Start | 58,200,080 bp |
| Band | 14q23.1 | End | 58,235,636 bp |

Gene location (Mouse)
| Chr. | Chromosome 12 (mouse) |
| Band | 12|12 C2 | Start | 70,984,631 bp |
| Band | 12|12 C2 | End | 71,011,492 bp |
RNA expression pattern
| Bgee | Human / Mouse (ortholog); Top expressed in: secondary oocyte; pons; middle temporal gyrus; prefrontal cortex; Achilles tendon; ganglionic eminence; Brodmann area 9; spinal ganglia; ventricular zone; parotid gland / Top expressed in: seminiferous tubule; spermatid; spermatocyte; medial ganglionic eminence; ventricular zone; facial motor nucleus; endothelial cell of lymphatic vessel; interventricular septum; granulocyte; neural tube; More reference expression data |
| BioGPS | n/a |
Gene ontology
| Molecular function | protein binding |
| Cellular component | cytoplasm; cytoskeleton; dynactin complex; extracellular region; azurophil granule lumen; ficolin-1-rich granule lumen; cytosol; axon cytoplasm |
| Biological process | microtubule-based movement; neutrophil degranulation; endoplasmic reticulum to Golgi vesicle-mediated transport; antigen processing and presentation of exogenous peptide antigen via MHC class II; retrograde axonal transport of mitochondrion |
Sources:Amigo / QuickGO
Orthologs
| Databases | NCBI: entry; OMA: entry |
| Species | Human | Mouse |
| Entrez | 55860 | 56444 |
| Ensembl | ENSG00000131966 | ENSMUSG00000021076 |
| UniProt | Q9NZ32 | Q9QZB7 |
| RefSeq (mRNA) | NM_018477 | NM_019785 |
| RefSeq (protein) | NP_060947 | NP_062759 |
| Location (UCSC) | Chr 14: 58.2 – 58.24 Mb | Chr 12: 70.98 – 71.01 Mb |
| PubMed search |
- Wikidata
| View/Edit Human | View/Edit Mouse |

Actin related protein 10 homolog is a protein that in humans is encoded by the ACTR10 gene.
