= DCTN2 =

Gene of the species Homo sapiens

Identifiers
- Aliases: DCTN2, DCTN50, DYNAMITIN, HEL-S-77, RBP50, dynactin subunit 2
- External IDs: OMIM: 607376; MGI: 107733; GeneCards: DCTN2

Gene location (Mouse)
Chr.	Chromosome 10 (mouse)
Band	10 D3|10 74.5 cM	Start	127,102,237 bp
Band	10 D3|10 74.5 cM	End	127,117,819 bp
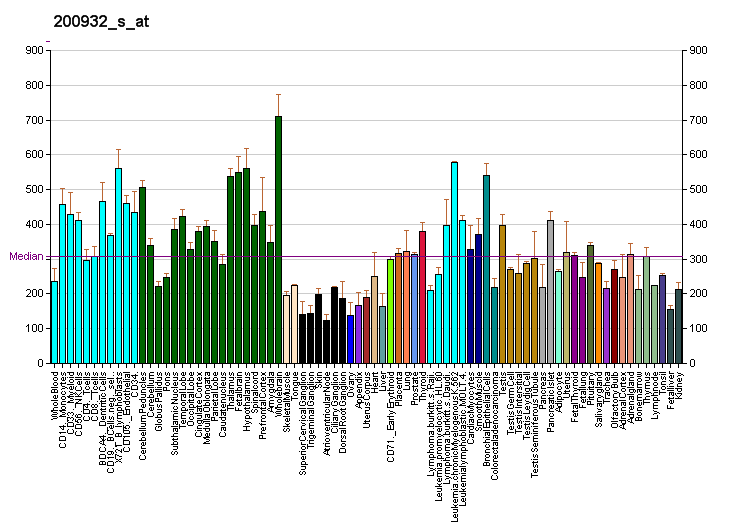

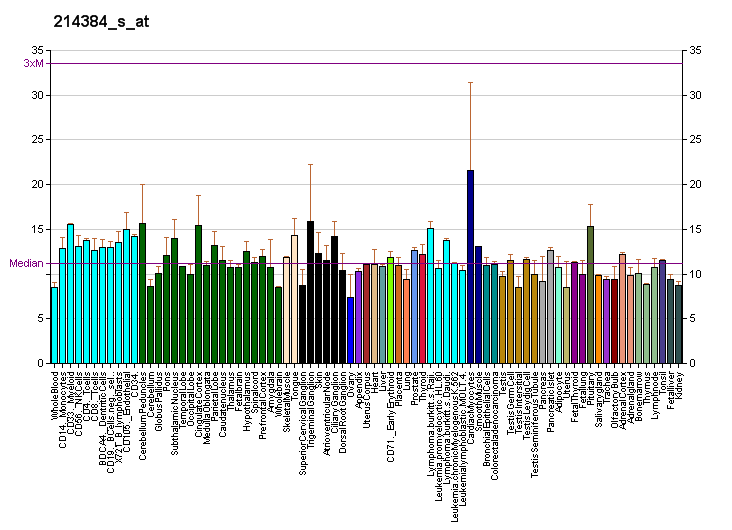
RNA expression pattern
Bgee	Human / Mouse (ortholog); n/a / Top expressed in: spermatocyte; spermatid; seminiferous tubule; dentate gyrus of hippocampal formation granule cell; superior frontal gyrus; lip; ventricular zone; primary visual cortex; cerebellar cortex; granulocyte
BioGPS	More reference expression data
Gene ontology
Molecular function	spectrin binding; protein binding; cytoskeletal motor activity; identical protein binding; protein kinase binding; host cell surface receptor binding
Cellular component	vesicle; centrosome; membrane; dynactin complex; growth cone; microtubule organizing center; dynein complex; microtubule; extracellular exosome; cytoskeleton; kinetochore; cytoplasm; cytosol
Biological process	antigen processing and presentation of exogenous peptide antigen via MHC class II; mitotic spindle organization; endoplasmic reticulum to Golgi vesicle-mediated transport; G2/M transition of mitotic cell cycle; melanosome transport; microtubule-based process; protein localization to centrosome; cell population proliferation; ciliary basal body-plasma membrane docking; regulation of G2/M transition of mitotic cell cycle; mitotic cell cycle
Sources:Amigo / QuickGO
Orthologs
Databases	NCBI: entry; OMA: entry
Species	Human	Mouse
Entrez	10540	69654
Ensembl	ENSG00000175203	ENSMUSG00000025410
UniProt	Q13561	Q99KJ8
RefSeq (mRNA)	NM_001261412; NM_001261413; NM_006400	NM_001190453; NM_001190454; NM_027151
RefSeq (protein)	NP_001248341; NP_001248342; NP_006391; NP_001334994; NP_001334995 NP_001334996; NP_001334997	NP_001177382; NP_001177383; NP_081427
Location (UCSC)	n/a	Chr 10: 127.1 – 127.12 Mb
PubMed search
- Wikidata
View/Edit Human	View/Edit Mouse

Dynactin subunit 2 is a protein that in humans is encoded by the DCTN2 gene.

== Function ==
This gene encodes a 50-kD subunit of dynactin, a macromolecular complex consisting of 23 subunits (11 individual proteins ranging in size from 22 to 150 kD). The subunit is commonly referred to as p50 or dynamitin. Dynactin binds to both microtubules and cytoplasmic dynein. It is involved in a diverse array of cellular functions, including ER-to-Golgi transport, the centripetal movement of lysosomes and endosomes, spindle formation, chromosome movement, nuclear positioning, and axonogenesis. This subunit is present in four copies per dynactin molecule. It contains three short alpha-helical coiled-coil domains that bind to two copies of p150-glued (DCTN1) and two copies of p24 (DCTN3) to form the dynactin shoulder domain.

== Interactions ==
DCTN2 has been shown to interact with MARCKSL1.
