= DCTN1 =

Protein-coding gene in the species Homo sapiens

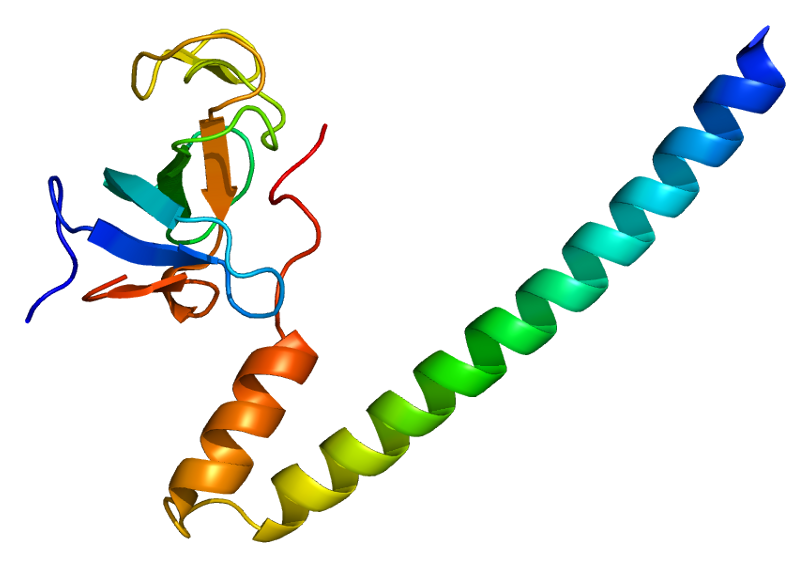

Identifiers
- Aliases: DCTN1, DAP-150, DP-150, P135, dynactin subunit 1
- External IDs: OMIM: 601143; MGI: 107745; GeneCards: DCTN1
Available structures
PDB	Ortholog search: PDBe RCSB
PDB	List of PDB id codes 1TXQ, 2COY, 2HKN, 2HKQ, 2HL3, 2HL5, 2HQH, 3E2U, 3TQ7

Gene location (Human)
Chr.	Chromosome 2 (human)
Band	2p13.1	Start	74,361,154 bp
Band	2p13.1	End	74,392,087 bp

Gene location (Mouse)
Chr.	Chromosome 6 (mouse)
Band	6 C3|6 35.94 cM	Start	83,142,902 bp
Band	6 C3|6 35.94 cM	End	83,177,099 bp
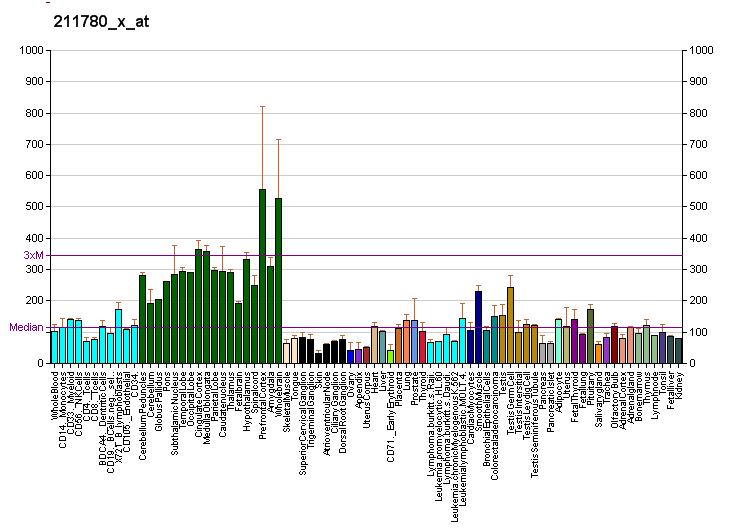

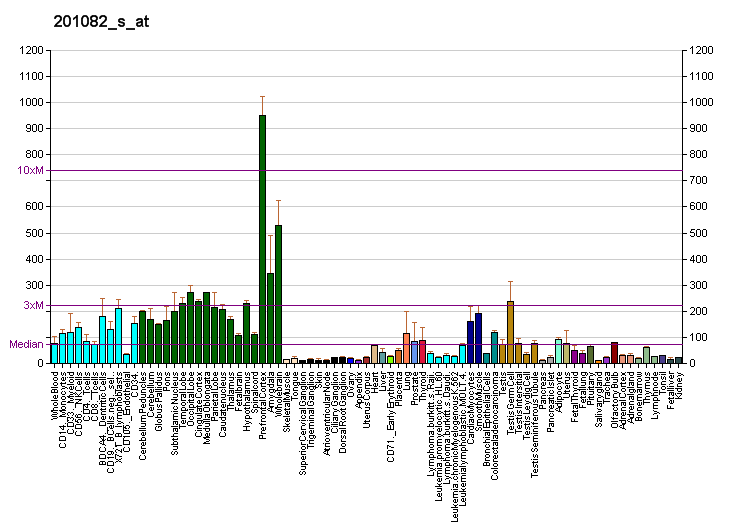
RNA expression pattern
Bgee	Human / Mouse (ortholog); Top expressed in: right frontal lobe; prefrontal cortex; right hemisphere of cerebellum; apex of heart; anterior cingulate cortex; nucleus accumbens; amygdala; putamen; caudate nucleus; anterior pituitary / Top expressed in: neural layer of retina; entorhinal cortex; perirhinal cortex; CA3 field; superior frontal gyrus; primary visual cortex; dentate gyrus of hippocampal formation granule cell; cerebellar cortex; muscle of thigh; central gray substance of midbrain; More reference expression data
BioGPS	More reference expression data
Gene ontology
Molecular function	protein binding; cytoskeletal motor activity; microtubule binding; tubulin binding; dynein complex binding; protein kinase binding; tau protein binding
Cellular component	cytoplasm; centrosome; membrane; dynactin complex; retromer complex; cell leading edge; dynein complex; microtubule; cytoskeleton; kinetochore; microtubule organizing center; nucleus; nuclear envelope; centriole; spindle; cytosol; actin cytoskeleton; microtubule plus-end; spindle pole; cell cortex region; cell cortex; microtubule associated complex; axon; neuron projection; soma; intermediate filament cytoskeleton; centriolar subdistal appendage
Biological process	antigen processing and presentation of exogenous peptide antigen via MHC class II; nervous system development; endoplasmic reticulum to Golgi vesicle-mediated transport; transport along microtubule; IRE1-mediated unfolded protein response; retrograde transport, endosome to Golgi; G2/M transition of mitotic cell cycle; melanosome transport; centriole-centriole cohesion; positive regulation of microtubule polymerization; microtubule anchoring at centrosome; nuclear membrane disassembly; positive regulation of microtubule nucleation; ciliary basal body-plasma membrane docking; non-motile cilium assembly; mitotic cell cycle; establishment of mitotic spindle orientation; regulation of mitotic spindle organization; cell cycle; cell division; regulation of G2/M transition of mitotic cell cycle; transport; neuromuscular junction development; ventral spinal cord development; neuromuscular process; motor behavior; neuron cellular homeostasis; axonal transport; maintenance of synapse structure; positive regulation of neuromuscular junction development; neuron projection maintenance
Sources:Amigo / QuickGO
Orthologs
Databases	NCBI: entry; OMA: entry
Species	Human	Mouse
Entrez	1639	13191
Ensembl	ENSG00000204843	ENSMUSG00000031865
UniProt	Q14203	O08788
RefSeq (mRNA)	NM_001135040; NM_001135041; NM_001190836; NM_001190837; NM_004082 NM_023019; NM_001378991; NM_001378992	NM_001198866; NM_001198867; NM_007835; NM_001347310
RefSeq (protein)	NP_001128512; NP_001128513; NP_001177765; NP_001177766; NP_004073 NP_075408; NP_001365920; NP_001365921	NP_001185795; NP_001185796; NP_001334239; NP_031861
Location (UCSC)	Chr 2: 74.36 – 74.39 Mb	Chr 6: 83.14 – 83.18 Mb
PubMed search
- Wikidata
View/Edit Human	View/Edit Mouse

Dynactin subunit 1 is a protein that in humans is encoded by the DCTN1 gene.

== Function ==
This gene encodes the largest subunit of dynactin, a macromolecular complex consisting of 23 subunits (11 individual proteins ranging in size from 22 to 150 kD). Dynactin binds to cytoplasmic dynein, dynein cargo adaptors, and microtubules. It is involved in a diverse array of cellular functions, including ER-to-Golgi transport, the centripetal movement of lysosomes and endosomes, spindle formation, chromosome movement, nuclear positioning, and axonogenesis.

This subunit is commonly referred to p150-glued. It is present in two copies per dynactin complex and forms an ≈75 nm long flexible arm that extends from the main body of dynactin. The p150-glued arm contains binding sites for microtubules, the microtubule plus tip binding protein EB1, and the N-terminus of the dynein intermediate chain.

Alternative splicing of this gene results in at least 2 functionally distinct isoforms: a ubiquitously expressed one and a brain-specific one. Based on its cytogenetic location, this gene is considered as a candidate gene for limb-girdle muscular dystrophy.

== Interactions ==
DCTN1 has been shown to interact with:

- BBS4,
- Dystonin,
- Grb2, and
- RAB6A.
