= Ankyrin-1 =

Protein-coding gene in the species Homo sapiens

ANK1
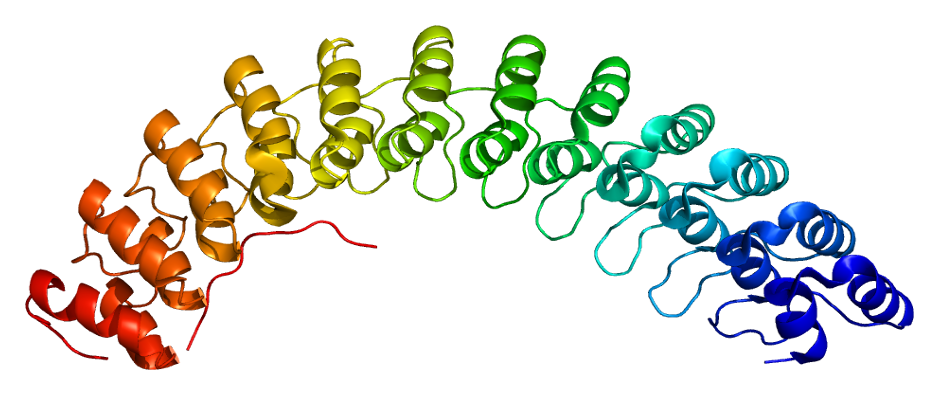

Identifiers
- Aliases: ANK1, ANK, SPH1, SPH2, ankyrin 1
- External IDs: OMIM: 612641; MGI: 88024; GeneCards: ANK1
Available structures
PDB	Ortholog search: PDBe RCSB
PDB	List of PDB id codes 1N11, 2YQF, 2YVI, 3F59, 3KBT, 3KBU, 3UD1, 3UD2

Gene location (Human)
Chr.	Chromosome 8 (human)
Band	8p11.21	Start	41,653,220 bp
Band	8p11.21	End	41,896,762 bp

Gene location (Mouse)
Chr.	Chromosome 8 (mouse)
Band	8 A2|8 11.42 cM	Start	23,464,860 bp
Band	8 A2|8 11.42 cM	End	23,640,513 bp
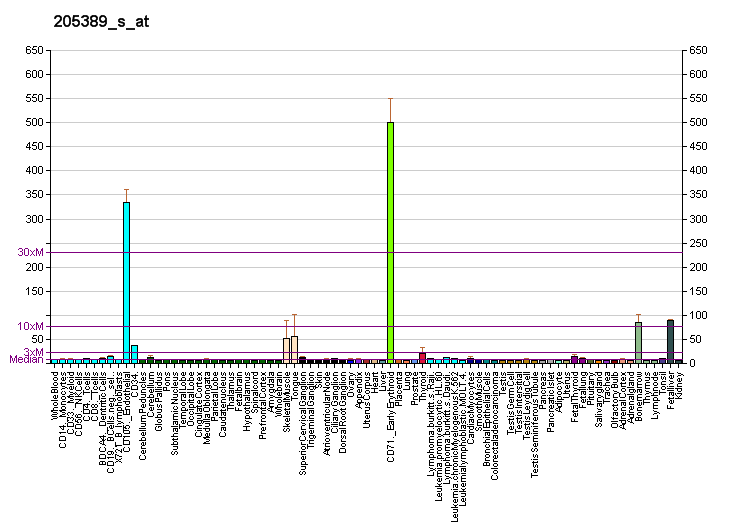

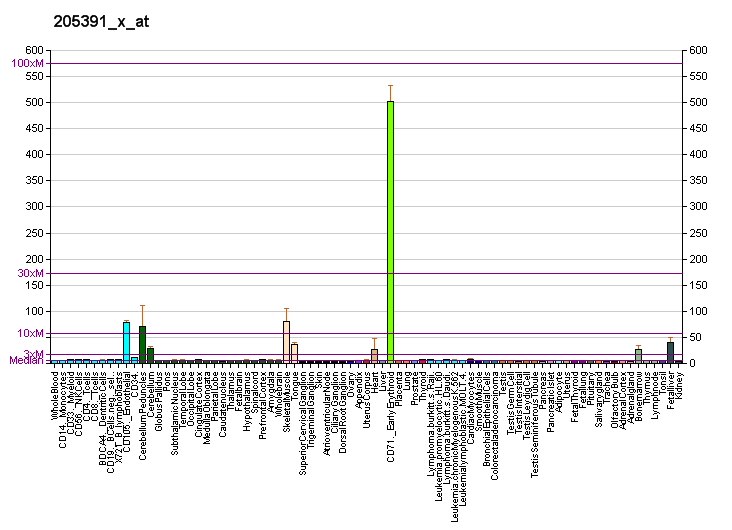

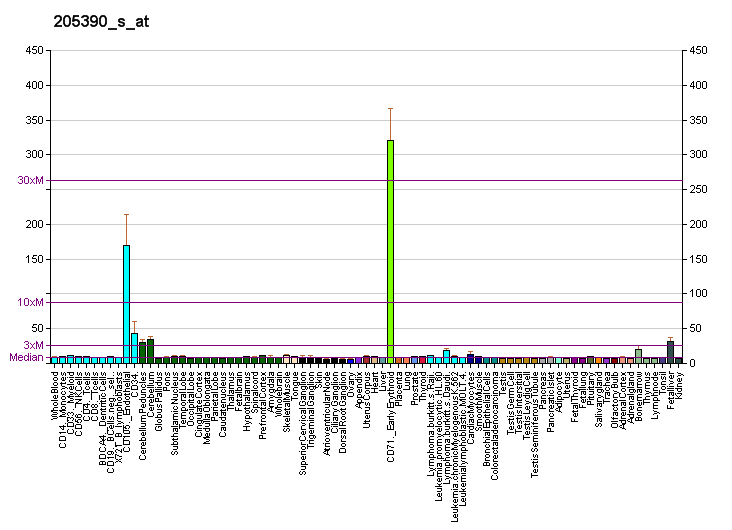
RNA expression pattern
Bgee	Human / Mouse (ortholog); Top expressed in: Skeletal muscle tissue of rectus abdominis; triceps brachii muscle; body of tongue; biceps brachii; Skeletal muscle tissue of biceps brachii; muscle of thigh; thoracic diaphragm; apex of heart; glutes; gastrocnemius muscle / Top expressed in: fetal liver hematopoietic progenitor cell; muscle of thigh; inferior colliculi; lobe of cerebellum; triceps brachii muscle; vastus lateralis muscle; pontine nuclei; cerebellar vermis; sternocleidomastoid muscle; skeletal muscle tissue; More reference expression data
BioGPS	More reference expression data
Gene ontology
Molecular function	spectrin binding; ATPase binding; structural molecule activity; structural constituent of cytoskeleton; protein binding; enzyme binding; cytoskeletal anchor activity
Cellular component	M band; cytosol; postsynaptic membrane; membrane; plasma membrane; sarcoplasmic reticulum; basolateral plasma membrane; Z discdkac; axolemma; spectrin-associated cytoskeleton; neuron projection; sarcolemma; A band; cytoskeleton; nucleus; cytoplasm
Biological process	positive regulation of organelle organization; endoplasmic reticulum to Golgi vesicle-mediated transport; maintenance of epithelial cell apical/basal polarity; cytoskeleton organization; signal transduction; exocytosis; protein localization to plasma membrane
Sources:Amigo / QuickGO
Orthologs
Databases	NCBI: entry; OMA: entry
Species	Human	Mouse
Entrez	286	11733
Ensembl	ENSG00000029534	ENSMUSG00000031543
UniProt	P16157	Q02357
RefSeq (mRNA)	NM_000037; NM_001142445; NM_001142446; NM_020475; NM_020476 NM_020477; NM_020478; NM_020479; NM_020480; NM_020481	NM_001110783; NM_001277280; NM_001277281; NM_001277284; NM_001277286 NM_001277289; NM_031158; NM_001310436; NM_001310437
RefSeq (protein)	NP_000028; NP_001135917; NP_001135918; NP_065208; NP_065209 NP_065210; NP_065211; NP_065213	NP_001104253; NP_001264209; NP_001264210; NP_001264213; NP_001264215 NP_001264218; NP_001297365; NP_001297366; NP_112435
Location (UCSC)	Chr 8: 41.65 – 41.9 Mb	Chr 8: 23.46 – 23.64 Mb
PubMed search
- Wikidata
View/Edit Human	View/Edit Mouse

Ankyrin 1, also known as ANK-1, and erythrocyte ankyrin, is a protein that in humans is encoded by the ANK1 gene.

== Tissue distribution ==
The protein encoded by this gene, Ankyrin 1, is the prototype of the ankyrin family, was first discovered in erythrocytes, but since has also been found in brain and muscles.

== Genetics ==
Complex patterns of alternative splicing in the regulatory domain, giving rise to different isoforms of ankyrin 1 have been described, however, the precise functions of the various isoforms are not known. Alternative polyadenylation accounting for the different sized erythrocytic ankyrin 1 mRNAs, has also been reported. Truncated muscle-specific isoforms of ankyrin 1 resulting from usage of an alternate promoter have also been identified.

== Disease linkage ==
Mutations in erythrocytic ankyrin 1 have been associated in approximately half of all patients with hereditary spherocytosis.

ANK1 shows altered methylation and expression in Alzheimer's disease. A gene expression study of postmortem brains has suggested ANK1 interacts with interferon-γ signalling.

== Function ==
The ANK1 protein belongs to the ankyrin family that are believed to link the integral membrane proteins to the underlying spectrin-actin cytoskeleton and play key roles in activities such as cell motility, activation, proliferation, contact, and maintenance of specialized membrane domains. Multiple isoforms of ankyrin with different affinities for various target proteins are expressed in a tissue-specific, developmentally regulated manner. Most ankyrins are typically composed of three structural domains: an amino-terminal domain containing multiple ankyrin repeats; a central region with a highly conserved spectrin-binding domain; and a carboxy-terminal regulatory domain, which is the least conserved and subject to variation.

The small ANK1 (sAnk1) protein splice variants makes contacts with obscurin, a giant protein surrounding the contractile apparatus in striated muscle.

== Interactions ==
ANK1 has been shown to interact with T-cell lymphoma invasion and metastasis-inducing protein 1, Titin, RHAG and OBSCN.

== See also ==
- Ankyrin
