= DCTN5 =

Protein-coding gene in the species Homo sapiens

Identifiers
- Aliases: DCTN5, dynactin subunit 5
- External IDs: OMIM: 612962; MGI: 1891689; GeneCards: DCTN5

Gene location (Human)
Chr.	Chromosome 16 (human)
Band	16p12.2	Start	23,641,466 bp
Band	16p12.2	End	23,677,472 bp

Gene location (Mouse)
Chr.	Chromosome 7 (mouse)
Band	7|7 F2	Start	121,732,264 bp
Band	7|7 F2	End	121,748,267 bp
RNA expression pattern
Bgee	Human / Mouse (ortholog); Top expressed in: islet of Langerhans; rectum; stromal cell of endometrium; smooth muscle tissue; monocyte; mucosa of esophagus; ganglionic eminence; lymph node; epithelium of colon; mucosa of transverse colon / Top expressed in: dentate gyrus of hippocampal formation granule cell; right kidney; granulocyte; superior frontal gyrus; medial ganglionic eminence; yolk sac; pituitary gland; tail of embryo; cumulus cell; blood; More reference expression data
BioGPS	n/a
Gene ontology
Molecular function	protein binding
Cellular component	cytoplasm; cytosol; centrosome; nuclear membrane; chromosome, centromeric region; cytoskeleton; kinetochore; nucleoplasm; chromosome
Biological process	endoplasmic reticulum to Golgi vesicle-mediated transport; aorta development; ventricular septum development; antigen processing and presentation of exogenous peptide antigen via MHC class II; coronary vasculature development
Sources:Amigo / QuickGO
Orthologs
Databases	NCBI: entry; OMA: entry
Species	Human	Mouse
Entrez	84516	59288
Ensembl	ENSG00000166847	ENSMUSG00000030868
UniProt	Q9BTE1	Q9QZB9
RefSeq (mRNA)	NM_001199011; NM_001199743; NM_032486	NM_021608
RefSeq (protein)	NP_001185940; NP_001186672; NP_115875	NP_067621
Location (UCSC)	Chr 16: 23.64 – 23.68 Mb	Chr 7: 121.73 – 121.75 Mb
PubMed search
- Wikidata
View/Edit Human	View/Edit Mouse

Dynactin 5 (p25) is a protein that in humans is encoded by the DCTN5 gene.

This gene encodes a subunit of dynactin, a component of the cytoplasmic dynein motor machinery involved in minus-end-directed transport. The encoded protein is a component of the pointed-end subcomplex and is thought to bind membranous cargo. A pseudogene of this gene is located on the long arm of chromosome 1. Alternatively spliced transcript variants encoding multiple isoforms have been observed for this gene.
