= DCTN4 =

Protein-coding gene in humans

Identifiers
- Aliases: DCTN4, DYN4, P62, dynactin subunit 4
- External IDs: OMIM: 614758; MGI: 1914915; GeneCards: DCTN4

Gene location (Human)
Chr.	Chromosome 5 (human)
Band	5q33.1	Start	150,708,440 bp
Band	5q33.1	End	150,759,095 bp

Gene location (Mouse)
Chr.	Chromosome 18 (mouse)
Band	18|18 D3	Start	60,659,257 bp
Band	18|18 D3	End	60,691,838 bp
RNA expression pattern
Bgee	Human / Mouse (ortholog); Top expressed in: biceps brachii; Skeletal muscle tissue of rectus abdominis; Skeletal muscle tissue of biceps brachii; retinal pigment epithelium; tail of epididymis; corpus epididymis; lactiferous duct; pars reticulata; pars compacta; caput epididymis / Top expressed in: genital tubercle; cumulus cell; pineal gland; tail of embryo; supraoptic nucleus; ciliary body; renal corpuscle; aortic valve; medullary collecting duct; retinal pigment epithelium; More reference expression data
BioGPS	n/a
Gene ontology
Molecular function	protein binding; protein N-terminus binding
Cellular component	cytoplasm; cytosol; centrosome; cytoplasmic dynein complex; cytoskeleton; nucleus; dynactin complex; microtubule organizing center; kinetochore; spindle pole; stress fiber; focal adhesion; cell cortex; sarcomere
Biological process	endoplasmic reticulum to Golgi vesicle-mediated transport; nuclear migration; antigen processing and presentation of exogenous peptide antigen via MHC class II
Sources:Amigo / QuickGO
Orthologs
Databases	NCBI: entry; OMA: entry
Species	Human	Mouse
Entrez	51164	67665
Ensembl	ENSG00000132912	ENSMUSG00000024603
UniProt	Q9UJW0	Q8CBY8
RefSeq (mRNA)	NM_001135643; NM_001135644; NM_016221	NM_026302; NM_001357462
RefSeq (protein)	NP_001129115; NP_001129116; NP_057305	NP_080578; NP_001344391
Location (UCSC)	Chr 5: 150.71 – 150.76 Mb	Chr 18: 60.66 – 60.69 Mb
PubMed search
- Wikidata
View/Edit Human	View/Edit Mouse

Dynactin subunit 4 is a protein that in humans is encoded by the DCTN4 gene.
