= Glycophorin C =

Protein found in humans

GYPC

Identifiers
- Aliases: GYPC, CD236, CD236R, GE, GPC, GPD, GYPD, PAS-2, PAS-2', glycophorin C (Gerbich blood group), GE:GPC:GPD:GYPD
- External IDs: OMIM: 110750; MGI: 1098566; GeneCards: GYPC
Available structures
PDB	Ortholog search: PDBe RCSB
PDB	List of PDB id codes 2EJY

Gene location (Human)
Chr.	Chromosome 2 (human)
Band	2q14.3	Start	126,656,133 bp
Band	2q14.3	End	126,696,667 bp

Gene location (Mouse)
Chr.	Chromosome 18 (mouse)
Band	18 B1|18 18.05 cM	Start	32,661,375 bp
Band	18 B1|18 18.05 cM	End	32,693,087 bp
RNA expression pattern
Bgee	Human / Mouse (ortholog); Top expressed in: blood; trabecular bone; bone marrow; thoracic diaphragm; apex of heart; muscle of thigh; bone marrow cell; left ventricle; triceps brachii muscle; stromal cell of endometrium / Top expressed in: fetal liver hematopoietic progenitor cell; human fetus; interventricular septum; brown adipose tissue; spleen; bone marrow; subcutaneous adipose tissue; embryo; yolk sac; white adipose tissue; More reference expression data
BioGPS	n/a
Gene ontology
Molecular function	protein binding; signaling receptor binding; protein homodimerization activity; cell adhesion molecule binding
Cellular component	integral component of membrane; cortical cytoskeleton; integral component of plasma membrane; membrane; plasma membrane; extrinsic component of plasma membrane
Biological process	leukocyte migration; homophilic cell adhesion via plasma membrane adhesion molecules; heterophilic cell-cell adhesion via plasma membrane cell adhesion molecules; cell recognition
Sources:Amigo / QuickGO
Orthologs
Databases	NCBI: entry; OMA: entry
Species	Human	Mouse
Entrez	2995	71683
Ensembl	ENSG00000136732	ENSMUSG00000090523
UniProt	P04921	Q78HU7
RefSeq (mRNA)	NM_001256584; NM_002101; NM_016815	NM_001048207; NM_027863; NM_001347610
RefSeq (protein)	NP_001243513; NP_002092; NP_058131	NP_001041672; NP_001334539
Location (UCSC)	Chr 2: 126.66 – 126.7 Mb	Chr 18: 32.66 – 32.69 Mb
PubMed search
- Wikidata
View/Edit Human	View/Edit Mouse

Glycophorin C (GYPC; CD236/CD236R; glycoprotein beta; glycoconnectin; PAS-2') is a protein that in humans is encoded by the gene GYPC. It plays a functionally important role in maintaining erythrocyte shape and regulating membrane material properties, possibly through its interaction with protein 4.1. Moreover, it has previously been shown that membranes deficient in protein 4.1 exhibit decreased content of glycophorin C. It is also an integral membrane protein of the erythrocyte and acts as the receptor for the Plasmodium falciparum protein PfEBP-2 (erythrocyte binding protein 2; baebl; EBA-140).

== History ==
The antigen was discovered in 1960 when three women who lacked the antigen made anti-Gea in response to pregnancy. The antigen is named after one of the patients – a Mrs Gerbich. The following year a new but related antigen was discovered in a Mrs Yus for whom an antigen in this system is also named. In 1972 a numerical system for the antigens in this blood group was introduced.

== Genomics ==
Despite the similar names glycophorin C and D are unrelated to the other three glycophorins which encoded on chromosome 4 at location 4q28-q31. These latter proteins are closely related. Glycophorin A and glycophorin B carry the blood group MN and Ss antigens respectively. There are ~225,000 molecules of GPC and GPD per erythrocyte.

Originally it was thought that glycophorin C and D were the result of a gene duplication event but it was only later realised that they were encoded by the same gene. Glycophorin D (GPD) is generated from the glycophorin C messenger RNA by leaky translation at an in frame AUG at codon 30: glycophorin D = glycophorin C residues 30 to 128. This leaky translation appears to be a uniquely human trait.

Glycophorin C (GPC) is a single polypeptide chain of 128 amino acids and is encoded by a gene on the long arm of chromosome 2 (2q14-q21). The gene was first cloned in 1989 by High et al. The GPC gene is organized in four exons distributed over 13.5 kilobase pairs of DNA. Exon 1 encodes residues 1-16, exon 2 residues 17-35, exon 3 residues 36-63 and exon 4 residues 64-128. Exons 2 and 3 are highly homologous, with less than 5% nucleotide divergence. These exons also differ by a 9 amino acid insert at the 3' end of exon 3. The direct repeated segments containing these exons is 3.4 kilobase pairs long and may be derived from a recent duplication of a single ancestral domain. Exons 1, 2 and most of exon 3 encode the N-terminal extracellular domain while the remainder of exon 3 and exon 4 encode transmembrane and cytoplasmic domains.

Two isoforms are known and the gene is expressed in a wide variety of tissues including kidney, thymus, stomach, breast, adult liver and erythrocyte. In the non erythroid cell lines, expression is lower than in the erythrocyte and the protein is differentially glycosylated. In the erythrocyte glycophorin C makes up ~4% of the membrane sialoglycoproteins. The average number of O linked chains is 12 per molecule.

The gene is expressed early in the development of the erythrocyte, specifically in the erythroid burst-forming unit and erythroid colony-forming unit. The mRNA from human erythroblasts is ~1.4 kilobases long and the transcription start site in erythroid cells has been mapped to 1050 base pairs 5' of the start codon. It is expressed early in development and before the Kell antigens, Rhesus-associated glycoprotein, glycophorin A, band 3, the Rhesus antigen and glycophorin B.

In melanocytic cells Glycophorin C gene expression may be regulated by MITF.

GPC appears to be synthesized in excess in the erythrocyte and that the membrane content is regulated by band 4.1 (protein 4.1). Additional data on the regulation of glycophorin C is here.

In a study of this gene among the Hominoidea two finding unique to humans emerged: (1) an excess of non-synonymous divergence among species that appears to be caused solely by accelerated evolution and (2) the ability of the single GYPC gene to encode both the GPC and GPD proteins. The cause for this is not known but it was suggested that these findings might be the result of infection by Plasmodium falciparum.

== Molecular biology ==
After separation of red cell membranes by SDS-polyacrylamide gel electrophoresis and staining with periodic acid-Schiff staining (PAS) four glycophorins have been identified. These have been named glycophorin A, B, C and D in order of the quantity present in the membrane – glycophorin A being the most and glycophorin D the least common. A fifth (glycophorin E) has been identified within the human genome but cannot easily be detected on routine gel staining. In total the glycophorins constitute ~2% of the total erythrocyte membrane protein mass. Confusingly these proteins are also known under different nomenclatures but they are probably best known as the glycophorins.

Glycophorin C was first isolated in 1978. Glycophorin C and D are minor sialoglycoproteins contributing to 4% and 1% to the PAS-positive material and are present at about 2.0 and 0.5 × 10^{5} copies/cell respectively. In polyacrylamide gels glycophorin C's apparent weight is 32 kilodaltons (32 kDa). Its structure is similar to that of other glycophorins: a highly glycoslated extracellular domain (residues 1-58), a transmembrane domain (residues 59-81) and an intracellular domain (residues 82-128). About 90% of the glycophorin C present in the erythrocyte is bound to the cytoskeleton and the remaining 10% moves freely within the membrane.

Glycophorin D's apparent molecular weight is 23kDa. On average this protein has 6 O linked oligosaccharides per molecule.

Within the erythrocyte it interacts with band 4.1 (an 80-kDa protein) and p55 (a palmitoylated peripheral membrane phosphoprotein and a member of the membrane-associated guanylate kinase family) to form a ternary complex that is critical for the shape and stability of erythrocytes. The major attachment sites between the erythrocyte spectrin-actin cytoskeleton and the lipid bilayer are glycophorin C and band 3. The interaction with band 4.1 and p55 is mediated by the N terminal 30 kD domain of band 4.1 binding to a 16 amino acid segment (residues 82-98: residues 61-77 of glycophorin D) within the cytoplasmic domain of glycophorin C and to a positively charged 39 amino acid motif in p55. The majority of protein 4.1 is bound to glycophorin C. The magnitude of the strength of the interaction between glycophorin C and band 4.1 has been estimated to be 6.9 microNewtons per meter, a figure typical of protein–protein interactions.

Glycophorin C normally shows oscillatory movement in the erythrocyte membrane. This is reduced in Southeast Asian ovalocytosis a disease of erythrocytes due to a mutation in band 3.

== Transfusion medicine ==
These glycophorins are associated with eleven antigens of interest to transfusion medicine: the Gerbich (Ge2, Ge3, Ge4), the Yussef (Yus), the Webb (Wb or Ge5), the Duch (Dh(a) or Ge8), the Leach, the Lewis II (Ls(a) or Ge6), the Ahonen (An(a) or Ge7) and GEPL (Ge10*), GEAT (Ge11*) and GETI (Ge12*). Six are of high prevalence (Ge2, Ge3, Ge4, Ge10*, Ge11*, Ge12*) and five of low prevalence (Wb, Ls(a), An(a), Dh(a) and Ge9).

=== Gerbich antigen ===
Glycophorin C and D encode the Gerbich (Ge) antigens. There are four alleles, Ge-1 to Ge-4. Three types of Ge antigen negativity are known: Ge-1,-2,-3 (Leach phenotype), Ge-2,-3 and Ge-2,+3. A 3.4 kilobase pair deletion within the gene, which probably arose because of unequal crossing over between the two repeated domains, is responsible for the formation of the Ge-2,-3 genotype. The breakpoints of the deletion are located within introns 2 and 3 and results in the deletion of exon 3. This mutant gene is transcribed as a messenger RNA with a continuous open reading frame extending over 300 nucleotides and is translated into the sialoglycoprotein found on Ge-2,-3 red cells. A second 3.4 kilobase pair deletion within the glycophorin C gene eliminates only exon 2 by a similar mechanism and generates the mutant gene encoding for the abnormal glycoprotein found on Ge-2,+3 erythrocytes.

The Ge2 epitope is antigenic only on glycophorin D and is a cryptic antigen in glycophorin C. It is located within exon 2 and is sensitive to trypsin and papain but resistant to chymotrypsin and pronase. The Ge3 epitope is encoded by exon 3. It is sensitive to trypsin but resistant to chymotrypsin, papain and pronase. It is thought to lie in the between amino acids 42-50 in glycophorin C (residues 21-49 in glycophorin D). Ge4 is located within the first 21 amino acids of glycophorin C. It is sensitive to trypsin, papain, pronase and neuraminidase.

=== Leach antigen ===
The relatively rare Leach phenotype is due either to a deletion in exons 3 and 4 or to a frameshift mutation causing a premature stop codon in the glycophorin C gene, and persons with this phenotype are less susceptible (~60% of the control rate) to invasion by Plasmodium falciparum. Such individuals have a subtype of a condition called hereditary elliptocytosis. The abnormally shaped cells are known as elliptocytes or cameloid cells. The basis for this phenotype was first reported by Telen et al. The phenotype is Ge:-2,-3,-4.

=== Yussef antigen ===
The Yussef (Yus) phenotype is due to a 57 base pair deletion corresponding to exon 2. The antigen is known as GPC Yus.

Glycophorin C mutations are rare in most of the Western world, but are more common in some places where malaria is endemic. In Melanesia a greater percentage of the population is Gerbich negative (46.5%) than in any other part of the world. The incidence of Gerbich-negative phenotype caused by an exon 3 deletion in the Wosera (East Sepik Province) and Liksul (Madang Province) populations of Papua New Guinea is 0.463 and 0.176 respectively.

=== Webb antigen ===
The rare Webb (Wb) antigen (~1/1000 donors), originally described in 1963 in Australia, is the result of an alteration in glycosylation of glycophorin C: an A to G transition at nucleotide 23 results in an asparagine residue instead of the normal serine residue with the resultant loss of glycosylation. The antigen is known as GPC Wb.

=== Duch antigen ===
The rare Duch (Dh) antigen was discovered in Aarhus, Denmark (1968) and is also found on glycophorin C. It is due to a C to T transition at nucleotide 40 resulting in the replacement of leucine by phenylalanine. This antigen is sensitive to trypsin but resistant to chymotrypsin and Endo F.

=== Lewis antigen ===
The Lewis II (Ls(a); Ge-6) antigen has insert of 84 nucleotides into the ancestral GPC gene: the insert corresponds to the entire sequence of exon 3. Two subtypes of this antigen are known: beta Ls(a) which carries the Ge3 epitope and gamma Ls(a) which carries both the Ge2 and Ge3 epitopes. This antigen is also known as the Rs(a) antigen.

=== Ahonen antigen ===
The Ahonen (Ana) antigen was first reported in 1972. The antigen is found on glycophorin D. This antigen was discovered in a Finnish man on May 5, 1968, during post operative blood cross matching for an aortic aneurism repair. In Finland the incidence of this antigen was found to be 6/10,000 donors. In Sweden the incidence was 2/3266 donors. The molecular basis for the origin of this antigen lies within exon 2 where a G->T substitution in codon 67 (base position 199) converts an alanine to a serine residue. While this epitope exists within glycophorin C there it is a cryptantigen. It is only antigenic in glycophorin D because of the truncated N terminus.

=== Others ===
A duplicated exon 2 has erythrocytes also been reported in Japanese blood donors (~2/10,000). This mutation has not been associated with a new antigen.

=== Antibodies ===
Antibodies to the Gerbich antigens have been associated with transfusion reactions and mild hemolytic disease of the newborn. In other studies naturally occurring anti-Ge antibodies have been found and appear to be of no clinical significance. Immunological tolerance towards Ge antigen has been suggested.

== Clinical diagnostic ==
Clinical testing in patient care for Gerbich antigens follows published minimum quality and operational requirements, similar to red cell genotyping for any of the other recognized blood group systems. Molecular analysis can identify gene variants (alleles) that may affect Gerbich antigens expression on the red cell membrane.

== Other areas ==
High expression of glycophorin C has been associated with a poor prognosis for acute lymphoblastic leukaemia in Chinese populations.

Glycophorin C is the receptor for the protein erythrocyte binding antigen 140 (EBA140) of Plasmodium falciparum. This interaction mediates a principal invasion pathway into the erythrocytes. The partial resistance of erythrocytes lacking this protein to invasion by P. falciparum was first noted in 1982. The lack of Gerbich antigens in the population of Papua New Guinea was noted in 1989.

Influenza A and B bind to glycophorin C.
