= Elwira Lisowska =

Polish biochemist and professor

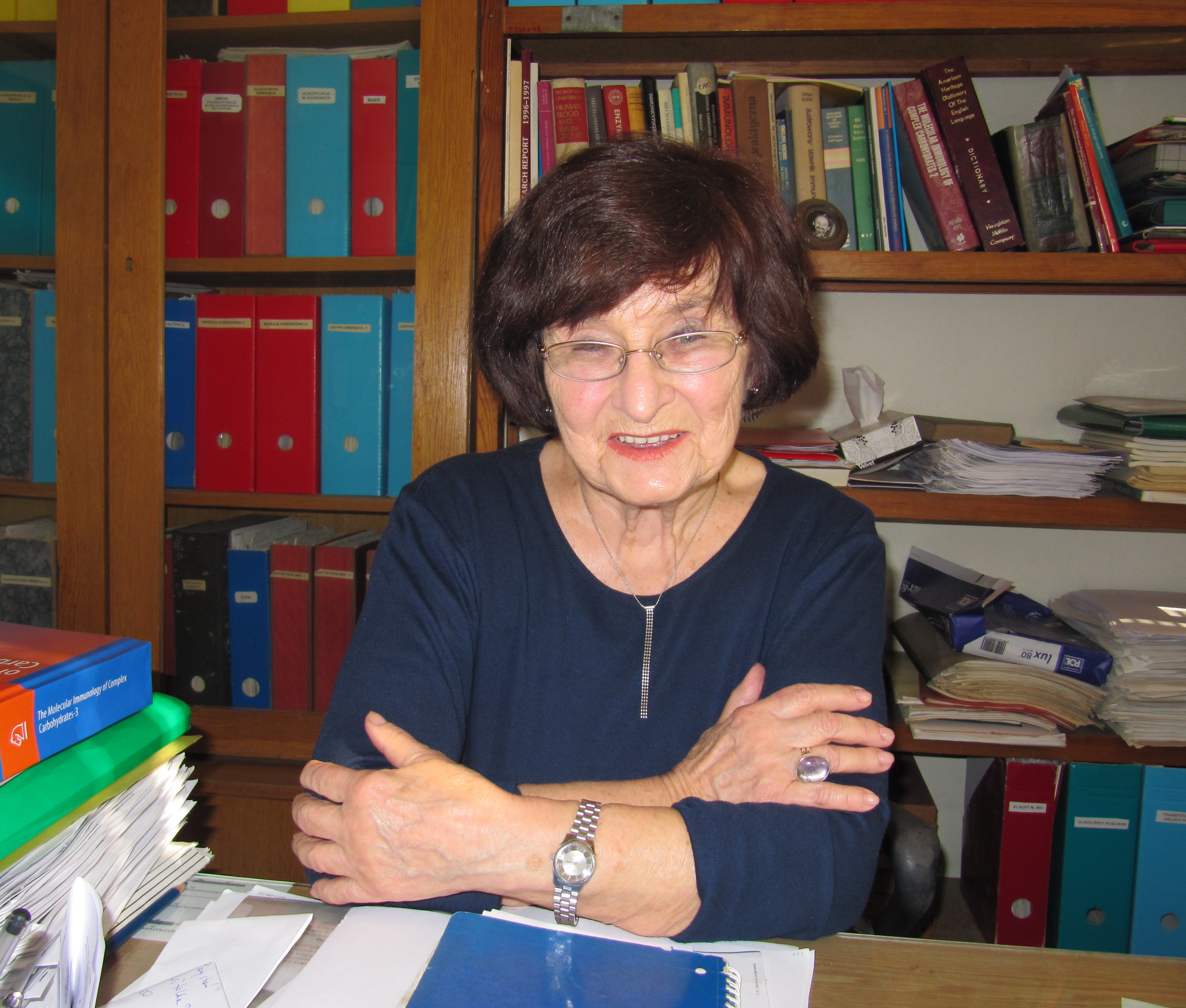
Prof. Elwira Lisowska

Bar of the Order of Polonia Restituta, Knight's Cross

Elwira Lisowska (born May 6, 1930) is a Polish biochemist and professor. She made significant contributions to the biochemistry of human blood groups, especially MNS and P1PK blood group systems, and to the immunochemical characterization of glycopeptide antigens.

== Early life and education ==
Lisowska was born in Przemyśl. She studied chemistry at the Wrocław University of Science and Technology. As a student she became interested in biomedical research, and worked with Tadeusz Baranowski in the Department of Physiological Chemistry. She moved to the Hirszfeld Institute of Immunology and Experimental Therapy where she started to work on blood group antigens. She earned her doctoral degree in 1962, and in the years 1969-1970 she spent one year as a post-doctoral fellow at Massachusetts General Hospital, where she worked with Roger W. Jeanloz.

== Research and career ==
For many years Lisowska worked on the M and N antigens. She identified that these antigens were carried by the glycosylated protein of the erythrocyte membrane called glycophorins. At first it was understood that the M and N antigens had carbohydrate character, but later it emerged that there were differences in amino acid sequence of polypeptide chain. Lisowska was the first to show that there was a difference between the amino acid residues at positions 1 and 5 of M and N antigens.

Beyond her work on M and N antigens, Lisowska solved the mystery of NOR polyagglutination, elucidated the structure of NOR antigen, which is the cause of NOR polyagglutination and a member of the human P1PK antigen system. and showed that the NOR antigen is recognized by antibodies present in most of human sera. In addition, she showed that carcinoembryonic antigen forms dimers in solution and was the first to demonstrate that human Band 3 anion transport protein is proteolytically degraded during the lifespan of erythrocyte. She characterized several lectins, including Vicia graminea lectin which is specific for human N blood group antigen, described novel methods of lectin modifications and proved that they are valuable tools in glycoconjugate research. She participated in elucidation of structure and function of glycans from human glycophorin A and glycophorin C. She obtained and characterized several monoclonal antibodies recognizing M and N blood group antigens, as well as other fragments of glycophorin A. These studies were important in characterization of antigenic properties of human glycophorins.

She became head of Laboratory of Tissue Immunochemistry (later Laboratory of Glycoconjugate Immunochemistry) at the Hirszfeld Institute of Immunology and Experimental Therapy in 1973. In 1980 she became full professor. In the years 1992–2000 she was deputy director of the Hirszfeld Institute of Immunology and Experimental Therapy. She was a promoter of 9 Ph.D. theses. Elwira Lisowska served also as editor of the journal Archivum Immunologiae et Therapiae Experimentalis (1980–2016), European Journal of Biochemistry (1979–1987), Glycoconjugate Journal (1984–1990), Acta Biochimica Polonica (1977–2015), and Advances of Clinical and Experimental Medicine (2000–2003). In 2001 Elwira Lisowska retired from the Hirszfeld Institute of Immunology and Experimental Therapy.

== Awards and honours ==
- 1978 Award of the Faculty of Biological Sciences, Polish Academy of Sciences for participation in studies on immunochemistry of M and N blood group antigens.
- 1988 Award of the Polish Academy of Sciences for participation in studies on Band 3 anion transport protein.
- 1989 Parnas Award of the Polish Biochemical Society
- 2014 Order of Polonia Restituta, the Knight's Cross
- 2016 Diplome d'Honneur of the Polish Biochemical Society

== Select publications ==
- Wasniowska, Kazimiera; Drzeniek, Zofia; Lisowska, Elwira (1977-05-23). "The amino acids of M and N blood group glycopeptides are different". Biochemical and Biophysical Research Communications. 76 (1): 385–390. doi:10.1111/j.1432-1033.1982.tb06505.x. ISSN 0014-2956. PMID 7067692.
- Duk, Maria; Lisowska, Elwira; Kordowicz, Maria; Wasniowska, Kazimiera (1981-11-23). "Studies on the Specificity of the Binding Site of Vicia graminea Anti‐N Lectin". European Journal of Biochemistry. 123 (2): 105–112. doi:10.1016/0006-291X(77)90736-7. ISSN 0006-291X. PMID 1027437.
- Czerwinski, Marcin; Wasniowska, Kazimiera; Steuden, Iga; Duk, Maria; Wiedlocha, Antoni; Lisowska, Elwira (1988-07-01). "Degradation of the human erythrocyte membrane band 3 studied with monoclonal antibody directed against an epitope on the cytoplasmic fragment of band 3". European Journal of Biochemistry. 174 (4): 647–645. doi:10.1111/j.1432-1033.1988.tb14147.x. ISSN 0014-2956. PMID 2455637.
- Wasniowska, Kazimiera; Duk, Maria; Czerwinski, Marcin; Steuden, Iga; Dus, Danuta; Radzikowski, Czeslaw; Bartosz-Bechowski, Hubert; Konopinska, Danuta; Lisowska, Elwira (1992-06-01). "Analysis of peptidic epitopes recognized by the three monoclonal antibodies specific for the same region of glycophorin A but showing different properties". Molecular Immunology. 29 (6): 783–791. doi:10.1016/0161-5890(92)90188-4. ISSN 0161-5890. PMID 1376415.
- Jaskiewcz, Ewa; Czerwinski, Marcin; Syper, Danuta; Lisowska, Elwira (1994-10-01). "Anti-M monoclonal antibodies cross-reacting with variant Mg antigen: an example of modulation of antigenic properties of peptide by its glycosylation". Blood. 84 (7): 2340–2345. doi:10.1182/blood.V84.7.2340.2340. ISSN 1528-0020. PMID 7919351.
- Duk, Maria; Reinhold, Bruce B; Reinhold, Vernon N; Kusnierz-Alejska, Grazyna; Lisowska, Elwira (2001-08-14). "Structure of a neutral glycosphingolipid recognized by human antibodies in polyagglutinable erythrocytes from the rare NOR phenotype". Journal of Biological Chemistry. 276 (44): 40574–40582. doi:10.1074/jbc.M102711200. ISSN 1083-351X. PMID 11504714.
- Lisowska, Elwira (2002-10-11). "The role of glycosylation in protein antigenic properties". Cellular and Molecular Life Sciences. 59 (1): 445–455. doi:10.1007/s00018-002-8437-3. ISSN 1420-9071. PMC 11337444. PMID 11964123. S2CID 7183929.
- Kusnierz-Alejska, Grazyna; Duk, Maria; Storry, JillR; Reid, MarionE; Wiecek, Barbara; Seyfried, Halina; Lisowska, Elwira (2002-12-19). "NOR polyagglutination and Sta glycophorin in one family: relation of NOR polyagglutination to terminal α‐galactose residues and abnormal glycolipids". Transfusion. 39 (1): 32–38. doi:10.1046/j.1537-2995.1999.39199116892.x. ISSN 1537-2995. PMID 9920164. S2CID 20333170.
- Wu, Albert M.; Lisowska, Elwira; Duk, Maria; Yang, Zhangung (2008-03-27). "Lectins as tools in glycoconjugate research". Glycoconjugate Journal. 26 (8): 899–913. doi:10.1007/s10719-008-9119-7. ISSN 1573-4986. PMID 18368479. S2CID 31163600.
