= C10H14N2O4 =

The molecular formula C_{10}H_{14}N_{2}O_{4} (molar mass: 226.23 g/mol, exact mass: 226.0954 u) may refer to:

- Carbidopa
- 2C-N
- Porphobilinogen
- Proxibarbital
- Valofane
