= Wanda Mejbaum-Katzenellenbogen =

Polish biochemist (1914–1986)

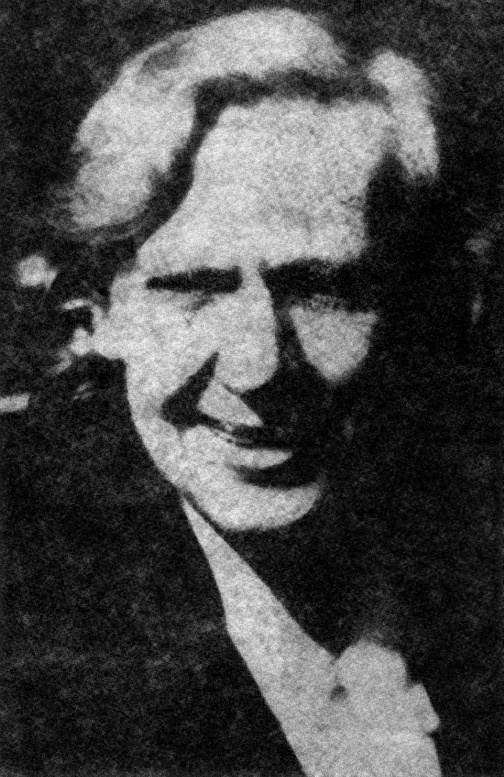
- Born: January 1, 1914; Lviv
- Died: August 19, 1986 (aged 72); Wrocław
- Education: University of Lviv
- Awards: Order of Polonia Restituta, Cross of Merit, Medal of the 10th Anniversary of People's Poland, Badge of the Honorary Title of Distinguished Teacher of the Polish People's Republic, Medal of the Commission of National Education, Millennium of the Polish State Badge
- Scientific career
- Fields: medical sciences: biochemistry
- Workplaces: University of Lviv; University of Wrocław; Wrocław Medical University
- Thesis: Micromethod for the Determination of Pentoses and its Application to Cozymase and Phosphocozymase (1939)

Wanda Lucyna Mejbaum-Katzenellenbogen (1 January 1914 in Lviv – 19 August 1986 in Wrocław) was a Polish biochemist, founder of the Wrocław school of biochemistry, and professor of medical sciences.

== Biography ==
=== Early life and childhood ===
Wanda Mejbaum was born in Lviv to Wacław Mejbaum, a historian, teacher, and activist of the National Democracy, and Maria Waleria (née Deryng, 1889–1962), a piano and singing teacher. She was their eldest child, with two brothers: Mestwin (1918–1926) and Wacław (1933–2002). In her hometown, she met her future husband, Jerzy Katzenellenbogen, with whom she studied at the Faculty of Medicine at the University of Lviv (Jerzy Katzenellenbogen later became a psychiatrist). Jerzy, of Jewish origin, hid in the Mejbaum family home in Zamarstyniv during the German occupation of Lviv. In 1946, their daughter Ewa was born in Gliwice, followed by Maria in Wrocław.

=== Lviv period ===
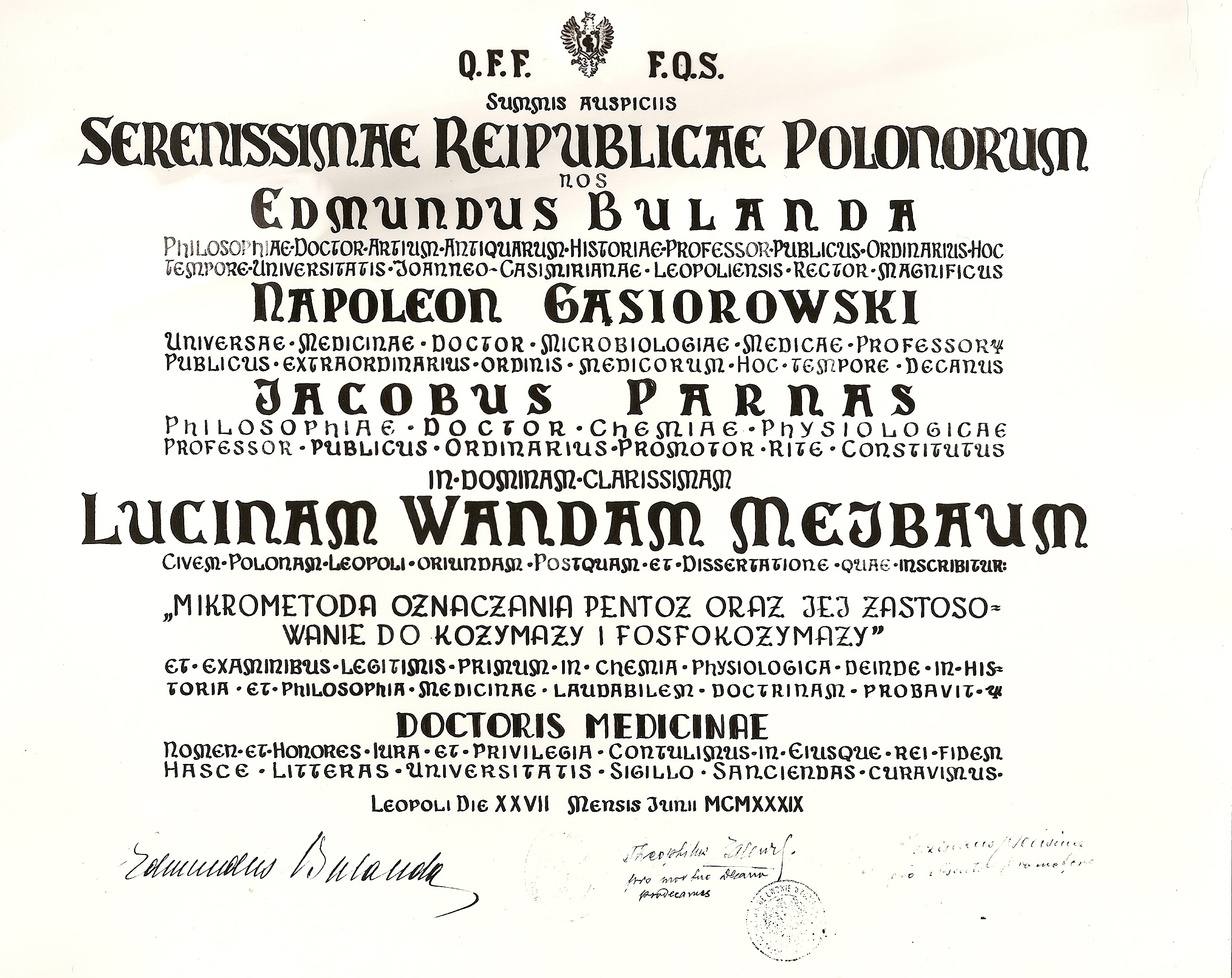
Doctoral diploma of Wanda Mejbaum-Katzenellenbogen

Wanda Mejbaum-Katzenellenbogen completed her studies at the Faculty of Medicine at the University of Lviv in 1938. During her third year, after passing her medical chemistry exam, she became an intern under Jakub Karol Parnas, continuing her work with his team in the following years. This opportunity allowed her to write her doctoral dissertation in the field of physiological chemistry titled Micromethod for the Determination of Pentoses and its Application to Cozymase and Phosphocozymase, which she defended at the age of 25, earning her medical sciences doctorate on 27 June 1939.

That same year, she published an article in the scientific journal Hoppe-Seyler's Zeitschrift für physiologische Chemie titled Determination of Small Quantities of Pentoses, Especially in Derivatives of Adenylic Acid, based on her doctoral thesis. From 1945 to 1988, this article became the eighth most cited (2,655 citations) scientific work in the biological sciences and the only Polish publication included in the so-called citation classics of Current Contents of Life Sciences.

=== Wrocław period ===
Until 1946, she conducted scientific and educational activities in Lviv, then moved to Wrocław, where she worked for many years at the University of Wrocław and the later-established Wrocław Medical University. During this time, together with Irena Mochnacka, she assisted Tadeusz Baranowski in rebuilding and organizing the scientific community in Wrocław. From 1946 to 1958, Wanda Mejbaum-Katzenellenbogen worked at the Department of Physiological Chemistry at the Medical Faculty of the university and the Wrocław University of Science and Technology (from 1950, the faculty of the Medical University). In 1959, she moved to the Faculty of Pharmacy at the Medical University, while also working at the University of Wrocław.

She served as a senior teaching assistant, then as an assistant professor, and in 1954, she obtained the position of docent, presenting a dissertation on the chemical composition and enzymes of smooth muscles. In 1961, she became an associate professor at the University of Wrocław and a full professor in 1973. At her initiative, in 1959, the biochemistry departments were established at the Faculty of Pharmacy of the Medical University and the Faculty of Natural Sciences at the University of Wrocław, which she headed. From 1959 to 1968, she also managed the Department of Physiological Chemistry at the Faculty of Pharmacy of the Medical University. In addition to organizing departments at both universities, she held various other positions later on. In 1961, she launched biochemistry as a new field of study at the University of Wrocław. From 1962 to 1964, she was the dean of the Faculty of Pharmacy, and later served as the director of the Institute of Botany (from 1964 to 1968) and of Botany and Biochemistry at the University of Wrocław (1971–1973). In 1969, she left the Medical University and continued her work at the University of Wrocław.

In addition to her university work, she was a member of the editorial board of the Polish scientific quarterly Postępy Biochemii (1968–1983), the scientific journal Acta Biochimica Polonica, and Wiadomości Chemiczne, as well as the chair of the Wrocław branch of the Polish Society of Laboratory Diagnostics (1962–1976) and the VIII Department (biological sciences) of the Wrocław Scientific Society (1970–1974). She was also an active member of the Polish Biochemical Society, as well as the Botanical and Physiological societies, and the Committee of Biochemistry and Biophysics of the Polish Academy of Sciences. In 1974, at her initiative, the first Scientific Sessions of Biochemistry Graduates were organized, which later evolved into the Scientific Sessions of Molecular Biology Graduates.

== Scientific contributions ==
Wanda Mejbaum-Katzenellenbogen conducted her research primarily in the fields of biochemistry and biochemical analytics, mainly at the University of Wrocław. In her studies, she developed original analytical methods for determining pentoses, proteins, alkylresorcinols, tannins, and glycoproteins in biological preparations. She also began research on the structure and function of polymer. She was interested in proteolytic enzymes and their inhibitors from animal and plant tissues, as well as the role of proteins in the structure and function of DNA and polysaccharides. In the following years, her students continued research in these and other areas, such as the study of phenolic compounds and glycoproteins.

She invented a practical and inexpensive turbidimetric method for protein determination using tannin, later known as the "Wrocław method", which enabled poorly equipped clinical analytical and scientific laboratories to work effectively. Another method she developed involved the concentration of proteins and glycoproteins using tannin and caffeine, facilitating the isolation of these macromolecules from bodily fluids. Mejbaum-Katzenellenbogen also studied the endogenous function of orosomucoid in the serum of healthy and sick individuals, which allowed for the discovery of its interactions with antibodies. She initiated and developed research on natural tannins in Wrocław, proposing that they could immobilize active proteins and other macromolecules in vivo.

She also began the production of biochemical reagents for the company Polskie Odczynniki Chemiczne (Polish Chemical Reagents). In the 1970s, the Institute of Biochemistry at the University of Wrocław was the only producer in the country of urease, acid phosphatase, ribonuclease, several protease inhibitors, and other reagents used in analysis and diagnostics.

Mejbaum-Katzenellenbogen published nearly 150 scientific papers and review articles in domestic and foreign scientific journals. She also published a script for biochemical exercises and, together with her husband, translated Harold Harper's textbook on physiological chemistry into Polish. Throughout her scientific and educational career, she trained over 150 biochemistry graduates, 35 doctors, and 8 habilitated doctors, most of whom later became professors.

== Awards and honors ==
For her scientific, educational, and organizational activities, she received numerous state honors, including the Golden Cross of Merit (1959), the 15th Anniversary Badge of the Liberation of Lower Silesia (1960), the Millennium of the Polish State Badge (1969), the Knight's Cross of the Order of Polonia Restituta (1973), the Medal of the 10th Anniversary of People's Poland (1975), the Medal of the Commission of National Education (1975), and she was also awarded the Badge of the Honorary Title of Distinguished Teacher of the Polish People's Republic (1982). She was repeatedly honored with awards from the Minister of Science, Higher Education, and Technology, as well as the Minister of Health and Social Welfare. In recognition of her contributions, the Polish Biochemical Society awarded her the title of Honorary Member (1983).
