= Wroclaw Medical University Press =

Polish university press

- Parent company: Wrocław Medical University
- Founded: 1976; 49 years ago
- Country of origin: Poland
- Headquarters location: Wrocław, Poland
- Publication types: academic journals, academic books, monographs, lecture scripts, commemorative publications and conference materials
- Official website: wydawnictwo.umw.edu.pl/en/home/

Wroclaw Medical University Press (Wydawnictwo Uniwersytetu Medycznego im. Piastów Śląskich we Wrocławiu) is an academic university press functioning at Wrocław Medical University, Wrocław, Poland, since 1976. The Vice-Rector for University Development is the supervisor of the unit. Previously, until 2007, the publishing house was functioning as Publishing Press Department and in the years 2007–2015, as Publishing Press and Promotion Department.

== History ==
Previously functioning as Wroclaw Medical Academy, Wrocław Medical University has been involved in the publishing industry since 1976. Bożena Kuczyńska was the first manager of the publishing unit. Then, the head of Publishing House Department was Urszula Mądrzak (1995-2005). Currently, Monika Kolęda is the manager of Wrocław Medical University Press (2014-now). The university press headquarters are located in Scientific Medical Information Centre at Marcinkowskiego 2–6 Street, Wrocław, Poland. Previously (until 2004), they were located at Pasteura 2 Street and, in the years 2004–2015, at Chałubińskiego 6A Street, Wrocław, Poland.

== Publications ==
The university press focuses on sharing the successes of researchers from Poland and abroad. The publications are intended for scientists and students. Wrocław Medical University Press publishes mainly scientific journals, academic books, monographs, lecture scripts, commemorative publications, and conference materials.

Scientific journals published by Wrocław Medical University Press include:

- Advances in Clinical and Experimental Medicine;
- Dental and Medical Problems;
- Polymers in Medicine.

All of the journals are published in the open access model.

The publications of Wroclaw Medical University Press include:

- Marek Bolanowski, Justyna Kuliczkowska-Płaksej (red.): Endokrynologia w praktyce klinicznej. Podręcznik dla studentów, Wrocław: Wydawnictwo UMW, 2019, ISBN 978-83-7055-399-9;
- Robert Śmigiel, Dariusz Patkowski (red.): Wrodzone zarośnięcie przełyku. Praktyczny przewodnik, Wrocław: Wydawnictwo UMW, 2018, ISBN 978-83-7055-394-4;
- Halina Grajeta (red.): Żywienie człowieka i analiza żywności. Wybrane zagadnienia, Wrocław: Wydawnictwo UMW, 2018, ISBN 978-83-7055-391-3;
- Jacek Szepietowski, Przemysław Pacan, Adam Reich, Magdalena Grzesiak (red.): Psychodermatologia, Wrocław: Wydawnictwo UMW, 2012, ISBN 978-83-7055-453-8;
- Jerzy Czernik (red.): Chirurgia dziecięca. Podręcznik dla studentów, Wrocław: Wydawnictwo UMW, 2008, ISBN 978-83-7055-401-9.
