= O-sialoglycoprotein endopeptidase =

Identifiers
- EC no.: 3.4.24.57
- CAS no.: 129430-53-1

Databases
- IntEnz: IntEnz view
- BRENDA: BRENDA entry
- ExPASy: NiceZyme view
- KEGG: KEGG entry
- MetaCyc: metabolic pathway
- PRIAM: profile
- PDB structures: RCSB PDB PDBe PDBsum
Search
- PMC: articles
- PubMed: articles
- NCBI: proteins

O-sialoglycoprotein endopeptidase (EC 3.4.24.57, glycoprotease, glycophorin A proteinase, glycoproteinase, sialoglycoprotease, sialoglycoproteinase, "OSGE") is an enzyme. This enzyme catalyses the following chemical reaction

Hydrolysis of O-sialoglycoproteins; cleaves -Arg^{31}-Asp- bond in glycophorin A. Does not cleave unglycosylated proteins, desialylated glycoproteins or glycoproteins that are only N-glycosylated

This enzyme is secreted by the bacterium Pasteurella haemolytica.
