= Leszek Szenborn =

Vaccinologist, infectiologist and pediatrician

Leszek Franciszek Szenborn is a vaccinologist, infectiologist and pediatrician.

== Biography ==
In 1982, he graduated with a medical degree from the Medical Academy of Wrocław. In 1985, he was hired at his alma mater. He also earned his doctorate there in 1992, based on his thesis Ocena wyników antybiotykoterapii i immunoterapii ropnych zapaleń opon mózgowo-rdzeniowych u dzieci (Evaluation of the Results of Antibiotic Therapy and Immunotherapy of Purulent Meningitis in Children), supervised by Zbigniew Kazimierz Rudkowski. In 2007, he obtained his habilitation, and in 2019, the title of professor of medical sciences.

He obtained a second-degree specialization in pediatrics and a specialization in infectious diseases. From 2009 to 2011, he served as president of the Polish Society of Vaccinology. He then became vice-president of the Polish Society of Pediatrics and vice-president of the Polish Society of Epidemiologists and Infectious Disease Physicians. He became head of the Department of Pediatrics and Infectious Diseases at the University Clinical Hospital in Wrocław.

He was the supervisor of nine doctoral dissertations.
