= WRB =

WRB, or wrb, may refer to:

- War Refugee Board
- World Reference Base for Soil Resources
- W. R. Berkley Corporation, NYSE ticker WRB
- WRB Refining LLC, operators of Wood River Refinery, Illinois, U.S.
- WRB, a part-of-speech tag in the Brown Corpus
- WRB. the IATA code for Robins Air Force Base in Georgia, U.S.
- wrb, the ISO 639 language code for the Warluwarra language, an extinct Australian Aboriginal language
- WRB. the National Rail code for Wrabness railway station in Essex, UK
- Wright b antigen (Wrb), located on Glycophorin A
- Warner Robins, Georgia
