= Tadeusz Baranowski =

Tadeusz Baranowski may refer to:

- Tadeusz Baranowski (artist) (1945–2026), Polish comic book artist
- Tadeusz Baranowski (chemist) (1910–1993), Polish chemist
