= Glycophorin =

Glycophorin A
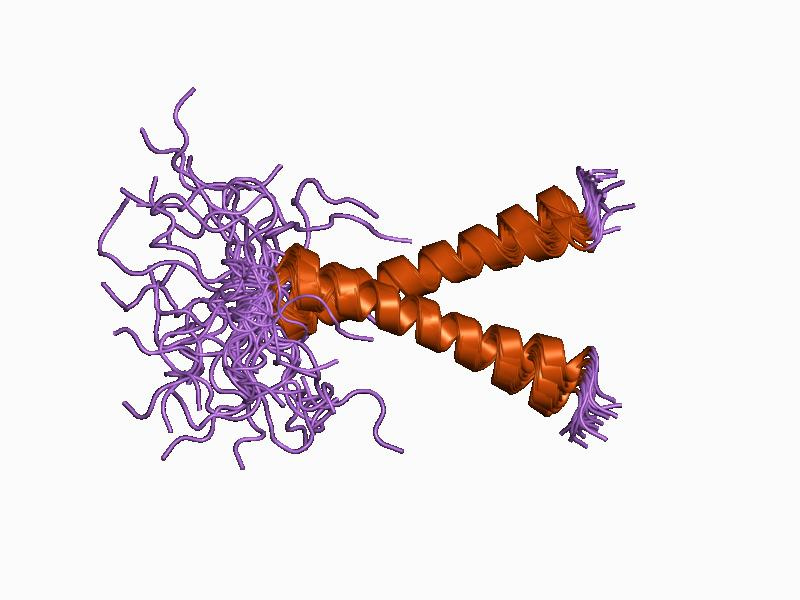
- Dimeric transmembrane domain of human glycophorin A (20 NMR-determined structures)

Identifiers
- Symbol: GYPA
- Pfam: PF01102
- InterPro: IPR001195
- PROSITE: PDOC00281
- SCOP2: 1afo / SCOPe / SUPFAM
- OPM superfamily: 25
- OPM protein: 5eh4
- Membranome: 156
Available protein structures:
- PDB: IPR001195 PF01102 (ECOD; PDBsum)
- AlphaFold: IPR001195; PF01102

A glycophorin is classified as a sialoglycoprotein transmembrane protein found on the surface of a red blood cells (RBCs). It is heavily glycosylated (60%), meaning there is a sufficient amount of sugar molecules (or chains) attached to its surface. This helps dictate their shape, protein stability, and how the protein can interact with its environment. Glycophorins are rich in sialic acid, which gives the red blood cells a very hydrophilic-charged coat. This enables them to circulate without adhering to other cells or vessel walls.

== Function ==
Glycophorins play multiple roles in cellular functions and have more specific roles based on their types. Both glycophorin A and glycophorin B are responsible for carrying different types of antigens in blood groups. Within the MNS blood group system, glycophorin A will carry M and N antigens, while glycophorin B will carry S, s, and U antigens. Differences in these antigens come from various amino acids in the protein’s extracellular domain. When encoding for glycoproteins, they will constantly undergo genetic recombination. This is how they develop structural variation and specific functionalities. This is where the DUP4 is established; it is a gene that will encode the Dantu blood group antigen. This mutation has been shown to decrease the likelihood of contracting severe malaria by around 40%. The Dantu antigen is essential for protecting against malaria. Glycophorin A and B also act as receptors for EBA-175 and EBL-1, which are on the surface of Plasmodium falciparum. Plasmodium falciparum is the parasite responsible for malaria in Africa. The presence of expressing DUP4 correlates with individuals with higher hemoglobin levels. When cells present DUP4, the surface tension of RBCs are increased; this makes it difficult for the parasite to invade. Thus, all done without altering how ligand receptors interact with the parasite. Another pathogen that glycophorins A and B will act as receptors for is Babesia divergens. Babesia divergens is a eukaryotic intracellular parasite that causes malaria-like symptoms in individuals who are immunocompromised. The roles Glycophorins A and B play in antigen presenting is still unclear. This is because individuals have recorded to maintain their health without Glycophorins A and B. Glycophorin C plays a key role in maintaining RBC shape; they act to preserve the biconcave discoid shape of the RBC. Because there is an abundance of Glycophorins on RBC surfaces, the RBC will maintain an overall negative charge. The charge is formed from the presence of glycans evenly coated on the surface. By having this overall negative charge, it will deter adhesion to other cells and the walls of blood vessels. In turn, this allows for proper circulation.

== Genomics ==
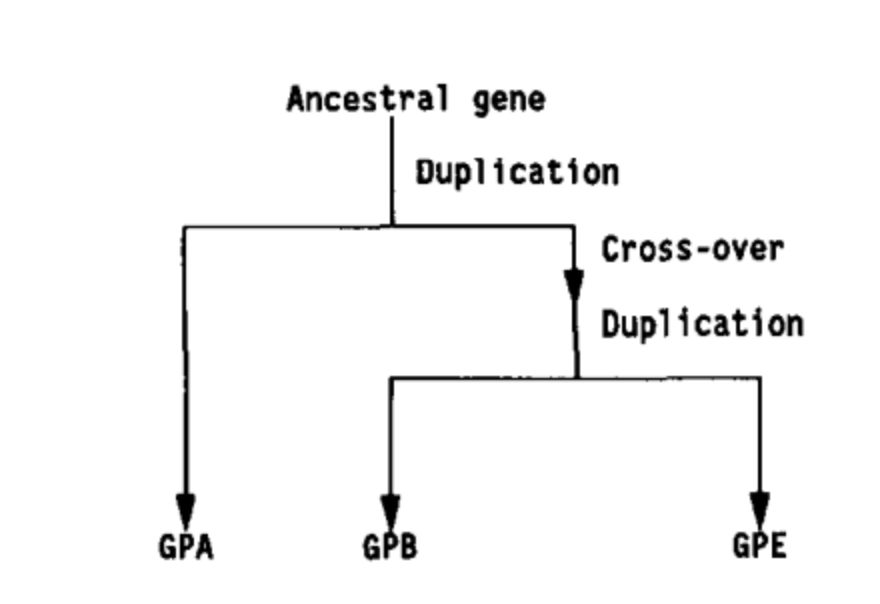
Shows the history of how the modern genes for Glycphorin A, B, and E came to be in a simple format.

The charge is formed from the presence of glycans evenly coated on the surface. By having this overall negative charge, it will deter adhesion to other cells and the walls of blood vessels. In turn, this allows for proper circulation. These rearrangements and protein fusions include processes like deletion or duplication of certain alleles, which will lead to the development of different alleles and increase variation within the species. The repetition along the chromosome will also lead to the development of multiple protein variants, increased variability, and increased hybrid genes. Combinations will involve either GYPA-GYPE, GYPA-GYPB, or GYPB-GYPE as partners. The genome splicing often includes different exons of GYPA/GYPE and GYPB. Glycophorin C and D are encoded from the singular gene, GYPC. Which means they are not related to GYP A and B. The development of the GYPC gene is not a result of recent duplications. Evolutionary studies have found that the GYPC gene evolved later than the GYP A and B genes. Therefore, making them results of natural selection and mediation from the extracellular domain. This finding suggests that it was a more recent evolution that was mediated by pathogens.

== Identification ==
After separation of red cell membranes by SDS-polyacrylamide gel electrophoresis and staining with periodic acid-Schiff staining (PAS), four glycophorins have been identified. These have been named glycophorin A, B, C, and D in order of the quantity present in the membrane, glycophorin A being the most and glycophorin D the least common. A fifth (glycophorin E) has been identified within the human genome but cannot easily be detected on routine gel staining. In total, the glycophorins constitute ~2% of the total erythrocyte membrane protein mass. These proteins are also known under different nomenclatures but they are probably best known as the glycophorins.

== Family members ==
The following four human genes encode glycophorin proteins:

- Glycophorin A
- Glycophorin B
- Glycophorin C
- Glycophorin E

Glycophorin D is now known to be a variant of glycophorin C.

== Relevance for Infection ==
Glycophorins are notably involved in malaria infection, as they are recognized by Plasmodium falciparum, the parasite that is the main cause of malaria infections in Africa. Glycophorin A is recognized by erythrocyte binding antigen 175 (EBA-175). Glycophorin B is recognized by erythrocyte binding ligand 1 (EB1). Glycophorin C is recognized by erythrocyte binding antigen 140 (EBA-140). Additionally fusion genes, such as the Dup4 structural variant, provide some resistance to P. falciparum invasion and malaria infection. Other structural variants exist but have not been extensively studied or linked to specific diseases.

Glycophorins A and B are recognized by the pathogen Babesia divergins. Glycophorin A is recognized by some strains of Escherichia coli and is known to act as a receptor to several other pathogens.
