= GYPE =

Identifiers
- Aliases: GYPE, GPE, MNS, MiIX, glycophorin E (MNS blood group), GYPA
- External IDs: OMIM: 138590; GeneCards: GYPE
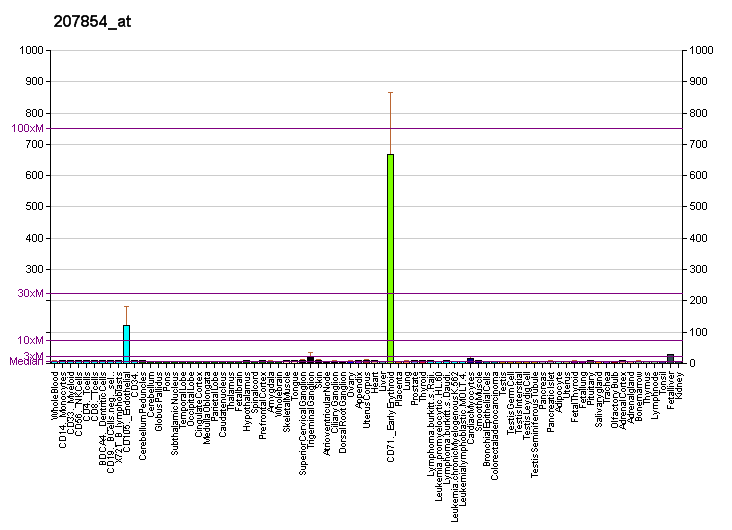
RNA expression pattern
Bgee	Human / Mouse (ortholog); Top expressed in: trabecular bone; bone marrow; frontal pole; middle frontal gyrus; spleen; thoracic aorta; ascending aorta; Achilles tendon; bone marrow cell; left coronary artery / n/a; More reference expression data
BioGPS	More reference expression data
Orthologs
Databases	NCBI: entry
Species	Human	Mouse
Entrez	2996	n/a
Ensembl	n/a	n/a
UniProt	P15421	n/a
RefSeq (mRNA)	NM_198682; NM_002102	n/a
RefSeq (protein)	NP_002093; NP_941391	n/a
Location (UCSC)	n/a	n/a
PubMed search		n/a
- Wikidata
View/Edit Human

Glycophorin-E is a transcribed pseudogene that in humans is encoded by the GYPE gene.

Glycophorins are a type of transmembrane proteins commonly found on red blood cells and contain antigens from various blood groups: this article will focus on one of the genes responsible for encoding glycophorins, specifically GYPE. GYPE is a gene responsible for encoding glycophorin GPE: a protein containing 78 amino acids with a 19 amino acid long leader sequence. GPE has yet to be expressed but it is known to be able to recombine with GYPA and GYPB to form hybrid genes through processes such as gene conversion and unequal crossover. GYPE, GYPA and GYPB are all tandemly located on chromosome 4 and are prone to rearrangement during homologous recombination resulting in the creation of fusion genes. As a result. It is often challenging to distinguish between gene conversion events and mismapping during gene mapping.

== Genomics ==
=== Amino acid sequence and gene expression ===
The nucleotide sequence of GYPE is remarkably similar to that of GYPB and GYPA from the 5’ flanking regions to the Alu sequence with major differences lying in its two pseudo-exons with defective donor splice sites within its 4 exons and 24 base pair intron which sets it apart from GYPB. The formation of GYPE and GYPB is likely due to uneven crossover between two misaligned GYPA strands in the Alu sequences, a recombination site. GYPE has been predicted to contain the blood group M antigen as DNA sequencing has revealed that GPE would have glycine and serine as the first and fifth amino acids but its unstable mRNA transcript prevents GPE from being expressed.

=== Non-allelic homologous recombination ===
Non-allelic homologous recombination events refer to homologous recombination between similar strands of DNA that can result in changes such as the deletion or duplication of an exon. Unequal crossing over on the other hand occurs when genes misalign during meiosis and exchange genetic material of different lengths. Both are methods in which fusion genes are created and are sources of genetic variation. An example of a complex structural variant is DU4 which results in the loss of GYPB but an extra copy of GYPE and 3 copies of GYPB-GYPA fusion genes.

=== Gene conversion ===
Gene conversion is the process in which regions of genes are copied over between genes. It has been hypothesized that GYPE and GYPB came from a common ancestral gene formed from uneven crossover and parts of GYPB were later incorporated into GYPE during gene conversion as GPYE shares the same 3’ splicing site as GYPA. There have been a number of hybrid genes discovered including GYPE with other glycophorins such as GY(A-E-A) and GY(B-E-B). Recently, a 59-amino acid glycophorin molecule containing GYPE has been discovered as GYPB-E(2-4)-B and carries the M and St^{a} antigen. Prior to this, alleles containing GYPE have been discovered in various individuals and GYPE has also been detected in gorillas and other primates. As of current, there is a lack of research in the discovery of new gene conversion variants compared to the catalog of structural hybrid genes.

=== Molecular biology ===
Glycophorin E is atypical because its gene is clearly present and transcribed, yet its protein expression appears extremely limited. Later review literature states that GYPE mRNA is unstable, which likely explains why glycophorin E has not been convincingly detected on the normal red blood cell surface. If expressed, the mature molecule would be relatively small, at about 59 amino acids after signal peptide removal. Many scientists treat GYPE as a gene of structural and evolutionary importance whose major significance lies in its participation in recombination and hybrid allele formation rather than in a well-defined independent membrane function.

Within blood group serology, glycophorin E is relevant mainly because the GYPE sequence contributes to variant glycophorins and hybrid alleles in the MNS system. The MNS system is primarily composed of glycophorin A, glycophorin B, and a wide range of glycophorin hybrids and variants. Although native glycophorin E is not normally regarded as a major surface blood group carrier, sequence from GYPE can be incorporated into hybrid genes that produce clinically recognised antigens, especially Sta. The 2000 study on a novel Sta glycophorin demonstrated that gene conversion from GYPE pseudoexon III into GYPA could generate a GPA-E-A hybrid expressing the Sta antigen. More recently, the 2020 study of Japanese blood donors showed that multiple distinct genetic mechanisms can underlie Sta positivity, including GYP(A-E-A) hybrid genes containing GYPE exon E2 and pseudoexon E3, as well as splice-site mutations affecting related glycophorin genes. Together, these studies show that glycophorin E is important in blood group genetics even if its native protein product is poorly expressed.

=== Molecular medicine ===
Glycophorin E is most relevant to transfusion medicine and molecular blood typing. GYPE-derived sequences can participate in hybrid glycophorin alleles that encode low-frequency, but clinically important, blood group antigens. Accurate genetic characterization of this locus is important when investigating unusual serologic findings. Reviews of the MNS system emphasize that antibodies against glycophorin-related antigens can be associated with hemolytic transfusion reactions and hemolytic disease of the fetus and newborn. The medical significance of GYPE lies less in a known direct biological function, more in its contribution to the genetic complexity of the glycophorin locus and the antigenic variation that can affect compatibility testing and transfusion safety.

==== Antigens ====
Glycophorin E is most closely associated with the M determinant. The original cloning study stated that the predicted glycophorin E amino acid sequence specifies blood group M rather than N, and subsequent reviews note that the exon 2 sequence encoding the M antigen in GYPE is identical to that in GYPA. Historical glycophorin work also showed more broadly that changes in glycophorin amino acid sequence are directly linked to differences in M and N blood group activity, providing important family-level context for how glycophorin sequence variation produces antigenic diversity. In practical terms, however, the antigenic importance of GYPE is most clearly seen when its sequence enters hybrid glycophorin molecules rather than when a normal glycophorin E protein is expressed on red cells.

==== Subsystems ====
GYPE belongs to the GYPA/GYPB/GYPE gene cluster: a genomic region that is prone to recombination, gene conversion, deletions, duplications, and fusion-gene formation. The literature describes this cluster as a large repeated region in which the high similarity among the three genes promotes rearrangement. GYPE is notable because it contains pseudoexons, and these sequences can be recruited into hybrid genes that alter blood group expression. As a result, glycophorin E is often discussed not as an isolated protein but as one component of a dynamic genomic subsystem that generates structural diversity across the MNS locus.

==== Reactions ====
Glycophorin E is relevant both at the molecular and serologic levels. At the molecular level, the major events involving GYPE are gene conversion, splice alterations, and hybrid gene formation, which can generate new glycophorin variants with altered antigenic properties. The Sta-related studies provide direct examples of this, showing that transfer of GYPE-derived sequence into GYPA can disrupt normal splicing or replace portions of the coding sequence. Creating variant glycophorins that are serologically detectable. At the serologic level, because such variants fall within the MNS system, they may be associated with clinically significant antibody reactions in transfusion settings.
