= Advances in Clinical and Experimental Medicine =

Medical journal

- Discipline: Medicine
- Language: English
- Edited by: Donata Kurpas

Publication details
- Former name: Postępy Medycyny Klinicznej i Doświadczalnej
- History: 1992-present
- Publisher: Wroclaw Medical University Press
- Frequency: Monthly
- Open access: Yes
- License: CC BY 3.0
- Impact factor: 2.1 (2022)

Standard abbreviations
- ISO 4: Adv. Clin. Exp. Med.

Indexing
- ISSN: 1899-5276 (print); 2451-2680 (web)
- OCLC no.: 749945803
- Postępy Medycyny Klinicznej i Doświadczalnej
- ISSN: 1230-025X

Links
- Journal homepage; Online archive

Advances in Clinical and Experimental Medicine is a monthly peer-reviewed open-access medical journal published by Wroclaw Medical University Press covering all aspects of clinical and experimental medicine. It publishes original articles, research-in-progress, research letters, systematic reviews, and meta-analyses. The editor-in-chief is Donata Kurpas (Wroclaw Medical University).

== History ==
The journal was established in 1992 as Postępy Medycyny Klinicznej i Doświadczalnej, obtaining its current name in 1998. The first editor-in-chief was Bogumił Halawa (1992–1997). He was succeeded by Leszek Paradowski (1997–1999). The next editor-in-chief of the journal was Antonina Harłozińska-Szmyrka (2000–2005), followed by Leszek Paradowski (2006–2007), Maria Podolak-Dawidziak (2008–2016), and Maciej Bagłaj (2017–2020). Donata Kurpas is the journal's editor-in-chief since 2021.

== Abstracting and indexing ==
The journal is abstracted and indexed in Embase, Index Medicus/MEDLINE/PubMed, Science Citation Index Expanded, and Scopus. According to the Journal Citation Reports, the journal has a 2022 impact factor of 2.1.
