= Podocalyxin =

Human sialoglycoprotein

Identifiers
- Symbol: PODXL
- Pfam: PF06365
- InterPro: IPR013836
- Membranome: 136
Available protein structures:
- PDB: IPR013836 PF06365 (ECOD; PDBsum)
- AlphaFold: IPR013836; PF06365

Podocalyxin, a sialoglycoprotein, is thought to be the major constituent of the glycocalyx of podocytes in the glomerulus (Bowman's capsule) in the kidneys. It is a member of the CD34 family of transmembrane sialomucins. It coats the secondary foot processes of the podocytes. It is negatively charged and thus functions through charge repulsion to keep adjacent foot processes separated, thereby keeping the urinary filtration barrier open. This function is further supported by knockout studies in mice which reveal an essential role in podocyte morphogenesis and a role in the opening of vascular lumens and regulation of vascular permeability. Of note, this is the only cell surface sialomucin knockout known to display a lethal phenotype.

Podocalyxin is also upregulated in a number of cancers and is frequently associated with poor prognosis. Podocalyxin is important for us to potentially provide a better understanding of cancer development and its aggressiveness through induced cell migration and the invasion from interacting with the actin-binding protein EZR. Effects of the EZR-dependent signaling events, among many other signal disturbances, can lead to increased activity in other vital pathways of cancer cells. Sialylated, O-glycosylated glycoforms of podocalyxin expressed by colon carcinoma cells possess L-selectin and E-selectin binding activity, and the affinity of the binding may be pivotal to the metastatic spread of colon carcinoma cells. At the cellular level podocalyxin has also been shown to regulate the size and topology of apical cell domains and act as a potent inducer of microvillus formation.

Podocalyxin is also known as TRA-1-60 and is a marker of pluripotent stem cells.

Discussion

Podocalyxin has been found to possess post a few translational modification events and likely has more to be discovered. There are Glycosylated O-linked events with the amino acid Serine at position 144, and two N-linked glycosylation events with Asparagine at positions 193 and 395. Along with phosphorylation residues at positions 570 and 596 with Serine. The composition of the Podocalyxin transmembrane protein consists of acidic residues from position 162–192, many polar residues at positions 200–219, 230–267, and 554–568, as well as containing both basic and acidic residues from position 590–605.

It has been found that the length of the protein is 605 amino acids and has a mass of about 65,076 daltons. The structure consists of topological domains at position 33-500 being extracellular and position 522-605 being cytoplasmic. The transmembrane domain is helical in structure at position 501–521.

Currently there are known mutation events at positions 97, 118, and 124 on the extracellular region of the protein likely altering protein structure and transduction signaling not invoking a correct bodily response.

== See also ==
- Cell signaling
- Cytoskeleton
