= Edward Sucharda =

Polish chemist and engineer

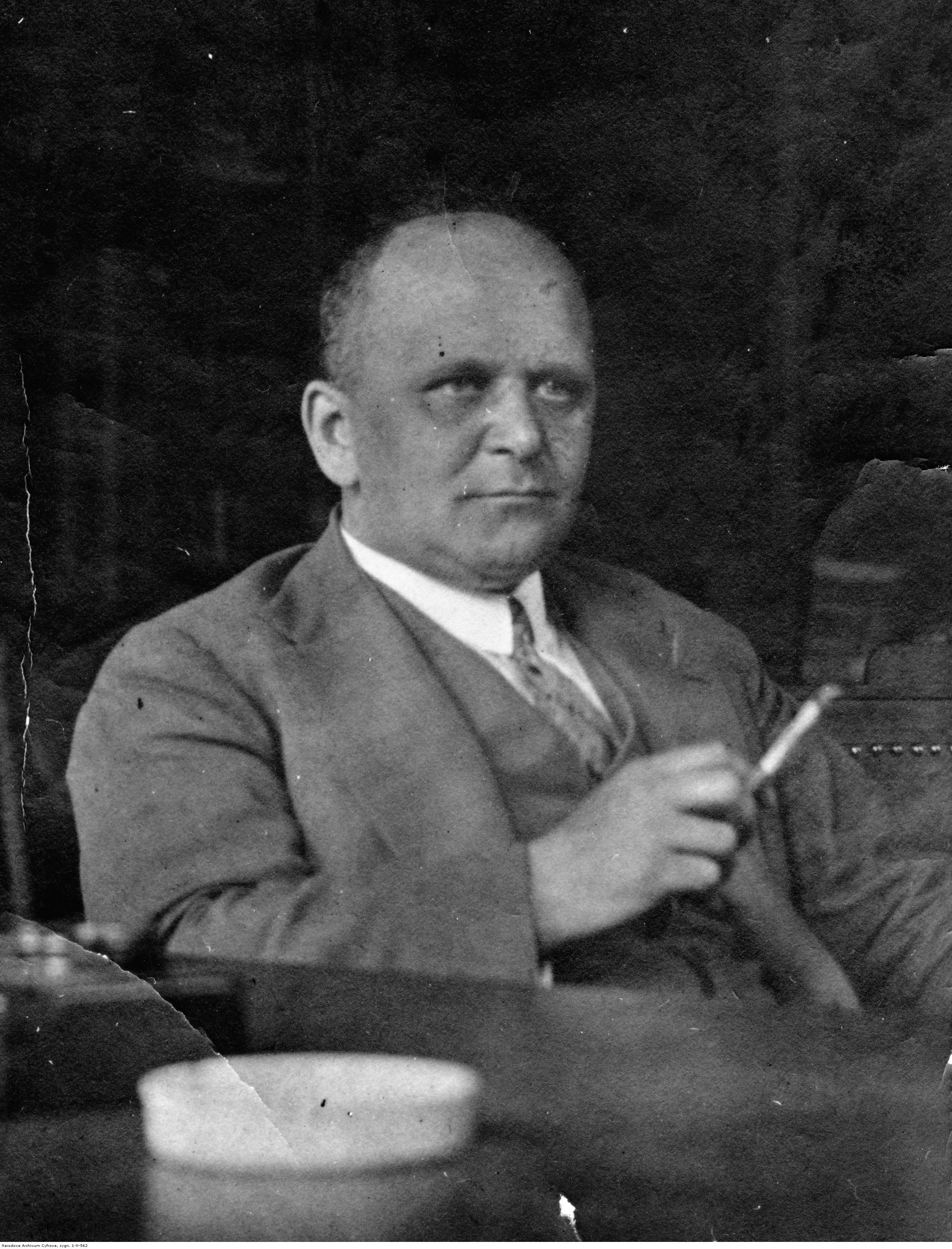
- Born: 18 June 1891; Brzeżany
- Died: 26 July 1947 (aged 56); Wrocław
- Occupation: Chemist

Edward Sucharda (18 June 1891 – 26 July 1947) was a renowned Polish chemist and engineer. He was rector of Lwów University of Technology from 1938 to 1939 and vice-rector of Wrocław University of Technology from 1945 to 1947.

== Scientific activity ==
Edward Sucharda's work was distinguished by four main areas of interest:

The first was related to the chemistry of nitrogen heterocyclic compounds, which he took over from his mentor, Prof. Niementowski . It included the development of synthesis of azaaromatic compounds: derivatives of pyridine, naphthyridine and phenanthroline (pupils and co-workers: Bogusław Bobrański, Henryk Kuczyński, C. Troszkiewicz, Zofia Skrowaczewska). Another important work was the synthesis of indigo and its derivatives by an ortho-condensation route (jointly with Edwin Płażek).

The second separate field of interest of Prof. Suchardy was the quantitative analysis of organic compounds. In 1928, together with B. Bobrański, he presented a completely new method for determining the carbon and hydrogen content in organic compounds, while adapting the Pregl method (for the determination of nitrogen). The method has been widely described and used around the world.

The third group of interests were issues of a technological nature in close cooperation with the Boruta dye factory in Zgierz and the oil industry in Drohobych (collaborators: Tadeusz Mazoński, H. Kuczyński and Leonard Kuczyński).

The last topic appeared around 1936 and concerned the chemistry and processing of terpenoid products, including for example, the problem of obtaining camphor. Later he spent several years studying the structures of terpene compounds (co-workers: H. and L. Kuczyński).

In total, he published 57 scientific papers, submitted 5 patents and co-authored two high school textbooks.
