= Glycophorin B =

Protein-coding gene in the species Homo sapiens

GYPB

Identifiers
- Aliases: GYPB, CD235b, GPB, GPB.NY, GYPHe.NY, GpMiIII, HGpMiIII, HGpMiVI, HGpMiX, MNS, PAS-3, SS, GYP, glycophorin B (MNS blood group), GYPA
- External IDs: OMIM: 617923; GeneCards: GYPB

Gene location (Human)
Chr.	Chromosome 4 (human)
Band	4q31.21	Start	143,996,104 bp
Band	4q31.21	End	144,019,380 bp
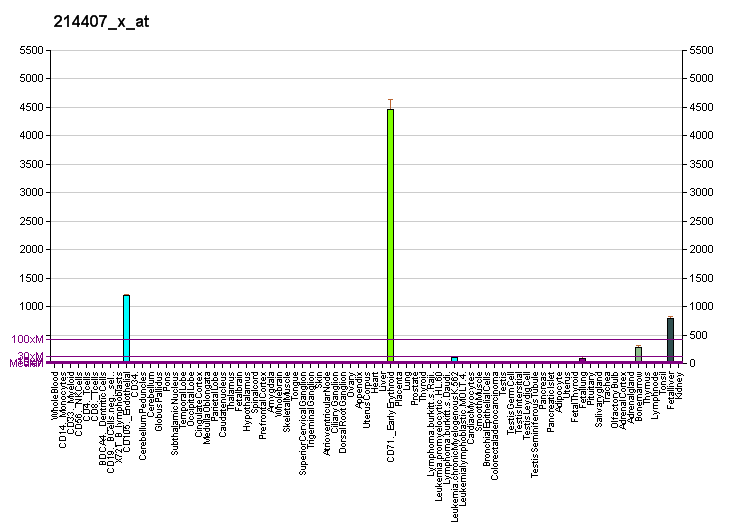

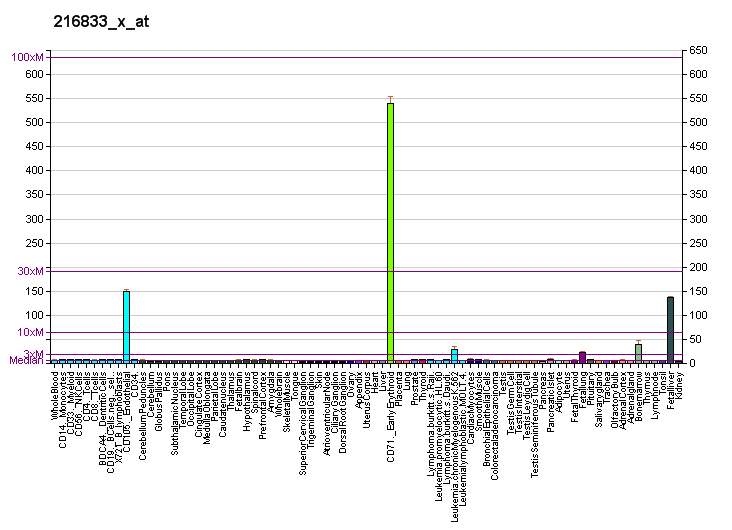

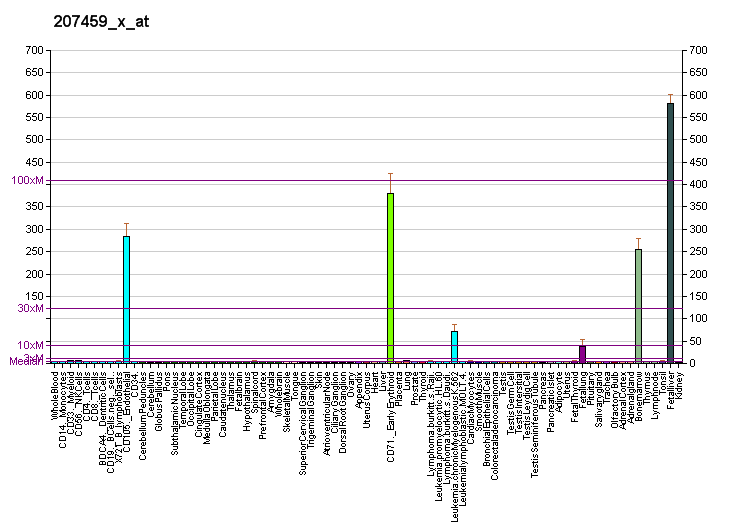
RNA expression pattern
Bgee	Human / Mouse (ortholog); Top expressed in: trabecular bone; bone marrow; bone marrow cell; testicle; monocyte; blood; buccal mucosa cell; Achilles tendon; gonad; spleen / n/a; More reference expression data
BioGPS	More reference expression data
Gene ontology
Molecular function	protein binding
Cellular component	integral component of plasma membrane; membrane; plasma membrane; integral component of membrane
Biological process	leukocyte migration
Sources:Amigo / QuickGO
Orthologs
Databases	NCBI: entry; OMA: entry
Species	Human	Mouse
Entrez	2994	n/a
Ensembl	ENSG00000250361	n/a
UniProt	P06028	n/a
RefSeq (mRNA)	NM_001304382; NM_002100	n/a
RefSeq (protein)	NP_001291311; NP_002091	n/a
Location (UCSC)	Chr 4: 144 – 144.02 Mb	n/a
PubMed search		n/a
- Wikidata
View/Edit Human

Glycophorin B (MNS blood group) (gene designation GYPB) also known as sialoglycoprotein delta and SS-active sialoglycoprotein is a protein which in humans is encoded by the GYPB gene. GYPB has also recently been designated CD235b (cluster of differentiation 235b).

== Function ==
Glycophorin A (GYPA) and B (GYPB; this protein) are major sialoglycoproteins of the human erythrocyte membrane which bear the antigenic determinants for the MN and Ss blood groups respectively. In addition to the M or N and S or s antigens, that commonly occur in all populations, about 40 related variant phenotypes have been identified. These variants include the Miltenberger (Mi) complex and several isoforms of Stones (St^{a}); also Dantu, Sat, Henshaw (He or MNS6), Mg and deletion variants En^{a}, S-s-U- and M^{k}. Most of these are the result of gene recombinations between GYPA and GYPB.

== Genomics ==
The gene is located on the long arm of chromosome 4 (4q28-q31) and has 5 exons. It was first sequenced in 1987 the peptide sequence of 72 amino acids having been determined earlier that year.

The gene has 97% sequence homology with the glycophorin A gene from the 5' UTR approximately 1 kilobase upstream from the exon encoding the transmembrane regions to the portion of the coding sequence encoding the first 45 amino acids. There is a signal sequence of 19 amino acid residues. The leader peptide differs by one amino acid and the next 26 amino acids are identical. Amino acids 27-55 of glycophorin A are absent from glycophorin B. This section includes an N-glycosylation site. Only O-glycosylation sites are found on glycoprotein B and these are linked via serine or threonine. Residues 80-100 of glycophorin A and 51-71 of glycophorin B are very similar. The intervening residues in contrast differ significantly. The antigenic determinant for the blood group Ss is located at residue 29 where S has a methionine and s a threonine. This is due to a mutation at nucleotide 143 (C->T). The S antigen is also known as MNS3 and the s antigen as MNS4.

It seems likely that this gene evolved by gene duplication and subsequent mutation of glycophorin A. The transition site from homologous to nonhomologous sequences can be localized within Alu repeat sequences.

== Molecular biology ==
There are ~80000 copies of glycophorin B per erythrocyte. Both glycophorin A and B are expressed on the renal endothelium and epithelium.

The first 40 amino acids of the mature protein are extracellular. The next 22 form a transmembrane segment and the remainder are intra cellular.

== Blood groups ==
The MNS blood group was the second set of antigens discovered. M and N were identified in 1927 by Landsteiner and Levine. S and s in were described later in 1947

The frequencies of these antigens are

- M: 78% Caucasian; 74% African descent
- N: 72% Caucasian; 75% African descent
- S: 55% Caucasian; 31% African descent
- s: 89% Caucasian; 93% African descent

== Molecular medicine ==
=== Transfusion medicine ===
The M and N antigens differ at two amino acid residues: the M allele has serine at position 1 (C at nucleotide 2) and glycine at position 5 (G at nucleotide 14) while the N allele has leucine at position 1 (T at nucleotide 2) and glutamate at position 5 (A at nucleotide 14)

Glycophorin B carries the blood group antigens 'N', Ss, and U. Both glycophorin A and B bind the Vicia graminea anti-N lectin. S and s antigens are not affected by treatment with trypsin or sialidase but are destroyed or much depressed by treatment with papain, pronase or alpha-chymotrypsin.

There are about 40 known variants in the MNS blood group system. These have arisen largely as a result of mutations within the 4 kb region coding for the extracellular domain. These include the antigens Mv, Dantu, Henshaw (He), Orriss (Or), Miltenberger, Raddon (FR) and Stones (St^{a}). Chimpanzees also have an MN blood antigen system. In chimpanzees M reacts strong but N only weakly.

=== Null mutants ===
Individuals who lack GypB have the phenotype S-s-U-. This may occur at frequencies of 20% in some African pygmies.

In individuals who lack both glycophorin A and B the phenotype has been designated M^{k}.

=== Dantu antigen ===
The Dantu antigen was described in 1984. The Dantu antigen has an apparent molecular weight of 29 kilodaltons (kDa) and 99 amino acids. The first 39 amino acids of the Dantu antigen are derived from glycophorin B and residues 40-99 are derived from glycophorin A. Dantu is associated with very weak s antigen, a protease-resistant N antigen and either very weak or no U antigen. There are at least three variants: MD, NE and Ph. The Dantu phenotype occurs with a frequency of Dantu phenotype is ~0.005 in American Blacks and < 0.001 in Germans.

=== Henshaw antigen ===
The Henshaw (He) antigen is due to a mutation of the N terminal region. There are three differences in the first three amino acid residues: the usual form has Tryptophan_{1}-Serine-Threonine-Serine-Glycine_{5} while Henshaw has Leucine_{1}-Serine-Threonine-Threonine-Glutamate_{5}. This antigen is rare in Caucasians but occurs at a frequency of 2.1% in US and UK of African origin. It occurs at the rate of 7.0% in blacks in Natal and 2.7% in West Africans. At least 3 variants of this antigen have been identified.

=== Miltenberger subsystem ===
The Miltenberger (Mi) subsystem originally consisting of five phenotypes (Mi^{a}, V^{w}, Mur, Hil and Hut) now has 11 recognised phenotypes numbered I to XI (The antigen 'Mur' is named after to the patient the original serum was isolated from - a Mrs Murrel.) The name originally given to this complex refers to the reaction erythrocytes gave to the standard Miltenberger antisera used to test them. The subclasses were based on additional reactions with other standard antisera.

Mi-I (Mi^{a}), Mi-II(V^{w}), Mi-VII and Mi-VIII are carried on glycophorin A. Mi-I is due to a mutation at amino acid 28 (threonine to methionine: C->T at nucleotide 83) resulting in a loss of the glycosylation at the asparagine_{26} residue. Mi-II is due to a mutation at amino acid 28 (threonine to lysine:C->A at nucleotide 83). Similar to the case of Mi-I this mutation results in a loss of the glycosylation at the asparagine_{26} residue. This alteration in glycosylation is detectable by the presence of a new 32kDa glycoprotein stainable with PAS. Mi-VII is due to a double mutation in glycophorin A converting an arginine residue into a threonine residue and a tyrosine residue into a serine at the positions 49 and 52 respectively. The threonine-49 residue is glycosylated. This appears to be the origin of one of the Mi-VII specific antigens (Anek) which is known to lie between residues 40-61 of glycophorin A and comprises sialic acid residue(s) attached to O-glycosidically linked oligosaccharide(s). This also explains the loss of a high frequency antigen ((EnaKT)) found in normal glycophorin A which is located within the residues 46–56. Mi-VIII is due to a mutation at amino acid residue 49 (arginine->threonine). M-VIII shares the Anek determinant with MiVII. Mi-III, Mi-VI and Mi-X are due to rearrangements of glycophorin A and B in the order GlyA (alpha)-GlyB (delta)-GlyA (alpha). Mil-IX in contrast is a reverse alpha-delta-alpha hybrid gene. Mi-V, MiV(J.L.) and St^{a} are due to unequal but homologous crossing-over between alpha and delta glycophorin genes. The MiV and MiV(J.L.) genes are arranged in the same 5' alpha-delta 3' frame whereas St^{a} gene is in a reciprocal 5'delta-alpha 3' configuration.

Although uncommon in Caucasians (0.0098%) and Japanese (0.006%), the frequency of Mi-III is exceptionally high in several Taiwanese aboriginal tribes (up to 90%). In contrast its frequency is 2-3% in Han Taiwanese (Minnan). The Mi-III phenotype occurs in 6.28% of Hong Kong Chinese.

Mi-IX (MNS32) occurs with a frequency of 0.43% in Denmark.

=== Stone's antigen ===
Stones (St^{a}) has been shown to be the product of a hybrid gene of which the 5'-half is derived from the glycophorin B whereas the 3'-half is derived from the glycophorin A. Several isoforms are known. This antigen is now considered to be part of the Miltenberger complex.

=== Sat antigen ===
A related antigen is Sat. This gene has six exons of which exon I to exon IV are identical to the N allele of glycophorin A whereas its 3' portion, including exon V and exon VI, are derived from the glycophorin B gene. The mature protein SAT protein contains 104 amino acid residues.

=== Orissa antigen ===
Orriss (Or) appears to be a mutant of glyphorin A but its precise nature has not yet been determined.

=== Transfusion reactions ===
Both anti-S and anti-s have been implicated in transfusion reactions and haemolytic disease of the newborn. Anti-M although occurring naturally has rarely been implicated in transfusion reactions. Anti-N is not considered to cause transfusion reactions. Severe reactions have been reported with anti-U and anti-Miltenberger. Anti Mi-I (Vw) and Mi-III has been recognised as a cause of haemolytic disease of the newborn. Raddon has been associated with severe transfusion reactions.

== Other areas ==
Glycophorin B acts as a receptor for erythrocyte binding Ligand (EBl-1) of Plasmodium falciparum involved in malaria. Both the Dantu and the S-s-U- cells phenotypes have been shown to be protective against P. falciparum infection while the Henshaw phenotype is not protective.

Influenza A and B bind to glycophorin B.
