= Bogusław Bobrański =

Polish chemist (1904–1991)

Bogusław Bobrański

Bogusław Bobrański (Polish pronunciation: [bɔˈɡus.waf bɔbraɲski]; 10 May 1904 in Nowy Sącz - 1991) was a Polish chemist. He was the rector of Wrocław Medical University from 1957 - 1962.

== Biography ==
Graduating in Chemistry from the Lviv Polytechnic, Bobrański received his engineering diploma in 1926. He worked in the Department of Organic Chemistry of his university under the supervision of Prof. Edward Sucharda.

Bobrański obtained his doctorate in 1929 and habilitation in 1932. He became head of the Department of Organic and Pharmaceutical Chemistry at the Pharmacy Department of the Jan Kazimierz University in Lviv . During the war, he briefly worked as a professor at the National Institute of Medicine in Lviv, managing the Department of Pharmaceutical Chemistry.

After the forced eviction from Lwów in 1946, he found himself in Wrocław. He worked at the Pharmaceutical Department at the Faculty of Medicine at the local Polytechnic and University. He became the head of the Department of Organic and Pharmaceutical Chemistry at the Wrocław Medical Academy. In 1956 he was appointed full professor.

Bobrański conducted extensive research on organic compounds, especially on psychotropic drugs. In 1956 he synthesised the barbiturate compound proxibarbital, which found medical application in Poland under the trade name of Ipronal, and in Hungary under the name Vasalgin. He also developed industrially attractive total syntheses of caffeine and theophylline, starting from urea.

In addition to academic textbooks, he wrote 150 experimental works in Poland and abroad. A promoter of sixteen doctoral dissertations, five of Prof. Bobrański's doctoral students later became professors in their own right.
