= Proxibarbital =

Chemical compound

Clinical data
- Other names: Proxibarbal, Proxibarbitone, Centralgal, Ipronal, 5-Allyl-5-(β-hydroxypropyl)barbituric acid
- ATC code: N05CA22 (WHO)

Identifiers
- IUPAC name: (RS)-5-allyl-5-(2-hydroxypropyl)pyrimidine-2,4,6(1H,3H,5H)-trione
- CAS Number: 2537-29-3
- PubChem CID: 17336
- ChemSpider: 16406
- UNII: F97OMS297F
- ChEMBL: ChEMBL2105233
- CompTox Dashboard (EPA): DTXSID20862980
- ECHA InfoCard: 100.018.004

Chemical and physical data
- Formula: C_{10}H_{14}N_{2}O_{4}
- Molar mass: 226.232 g·mol^{−1}
- 3D model (JSmol): Interactive image
- SMILES: O=C1NC(=O)NC(=O)C1(CC(O)C)C\C=C
- InChI: InChI=1S/C10H14N2O4/c1-3-4-10(5-6(2)13)7(14)11-9(16)12-8(10)15/h3,6,13H,1,4-5H2,2H3,(H2,11,12,14,15,16); Key:VNLMRPAWAMPLNZ-UHFFFAOYSA-N

Proxibarbital (Ipronal) is a barbiturate derivative synthesized in 1956 in Poland by Bogusław Bobrański. It has anti-anxiety and sedative properties and is, in contrast to most barbiturates, almost without hypnotic action. It was used as a sedative and anti-anxiety drug. It was also used in the treatment of migraine headaches in a similar manner to butalbital. It was a prescription drug available in Poland from the 1950s to the 1990s under trade name Ipronal.

Valofane isomerizes to proxibarbal in vivo.
