= Valofane =

Chemical compound

Clinical data
- Other names: N-carbamoyl-5-methyl-2-oxo-3-prop-2-enyloxolane-3-carboxamide
- ATC code: none

Identifiers
- IUPAC name: 3-allyl-N-(aminocarbonyl)-5-methyl-2-oxotetrahydrofuran-3-carboxamide
- CAS Number: 3258-51-3
- PubChem CID: 71122
- ChemSpider: 64272
- UNII: X71N6E5IPO
- ChEMBL: ChEMBL2104479
- CompTox Dashboard (EPA): DTXSID20863139
- ECHA InfoCard: 100.019.871

Chemical and physical data
- Formula: C_{10}H_{14}N_{2}O_{4}
- Molar mass: 226.232 g·mol^{−1}
- 3D model (JSmol): Interactive image
- SMILES: O=C(N)NC(=O)C1(C(=O)OC(C)C1)C\C=C
- InChI: InChI=1S/C10H14N2O4/c1-3-4-10(7(13)12-9(11)15)5-6(2)16-8(10)14/h3,6H,1,4-5H2,2H3,(H3,11,12,13,15); Key:LVJAHKSVOQLCEV-UHFFFAOYSA-N

Valofane is a sedative drug structurally related to the barbiturates and similar drugs such as primidone. It is metabolized once inside the body to form the barbiturate proxibarbital (proxibarbal) and is thus a prodrug.
