= Sialoglycoprotein =

Protein modified with sugar molecules including sialic acid

Sialic acid

A sialoglycoprotein is a combination of sialic acid and glycoprotein, which is, itself, a combination of sugar and protein. These proteins often contain one or more sialyl oligosaccharides that are covalently bound to the rest of the molecule.

Glycophorin C is one common sialoglycoprotein. Podocalyxin is another sialoglycoprotein found in the foot processes of the podocyte cells of the glomerulus in kidneys. Podocalyxin is negatively charged and therefore repels other negatively charged molecules, thus contributing to the minimal filtration of negatively charged molecules by the kidney. Its molecular weight is 46 kDa.
