= Glycophorin A =

Protein-coding gene in the species Homo sapiens

GYPA
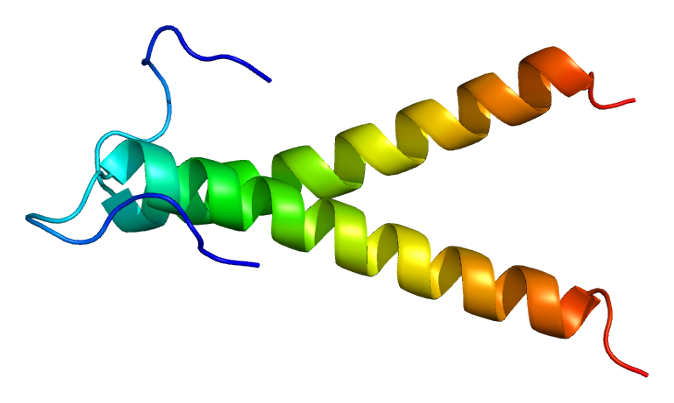

Identifiers
- Aliases: GYPA, CD235a, GPA, GPErik, GPSAT, HGpMiV, HGpMiXI, HGpSta(C), MN, MNS, PAS-2, glycophorin A (MNS blood group)
- External IDs: OMIM: 617922; GeneCards: GYPA
Available structures
PDB	Human UniProt search: PDBe RCSB
PDB	List of PDB id codes 1AFO, 2KPE, 2KPF, 5EH4, 5EH6

Gene location (Human)
Chr.	Chromosome 4 (human)
Band	4q31.21	Start	144,109,303 bp
Band	4q31.21	End	144,140,751 bp
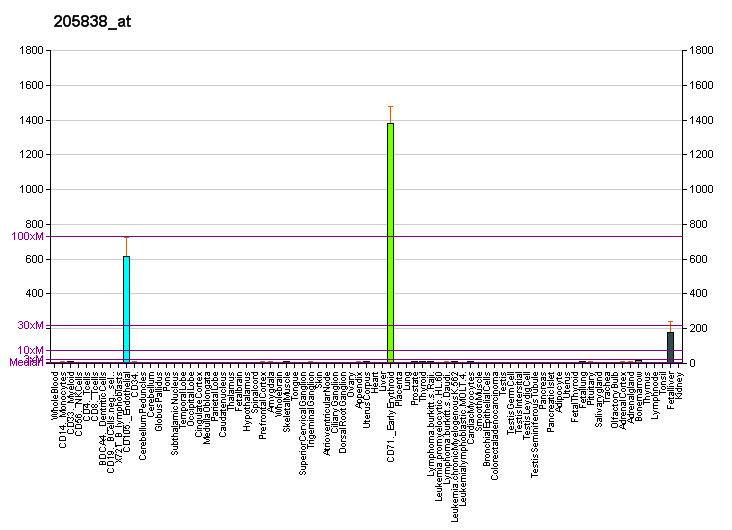

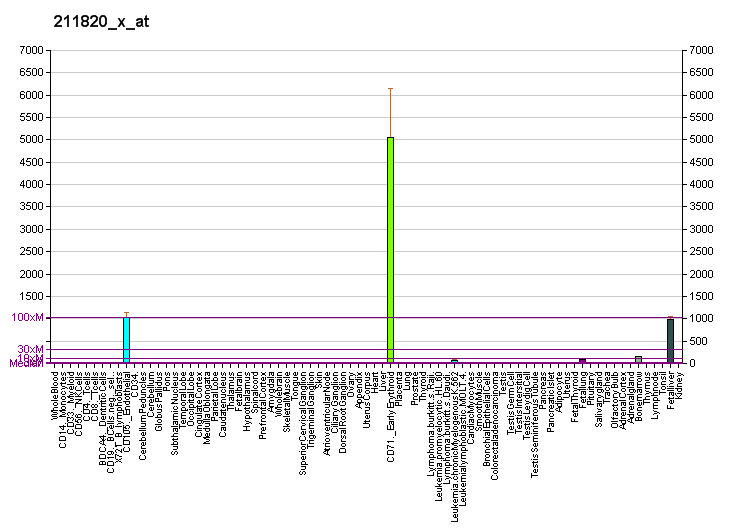

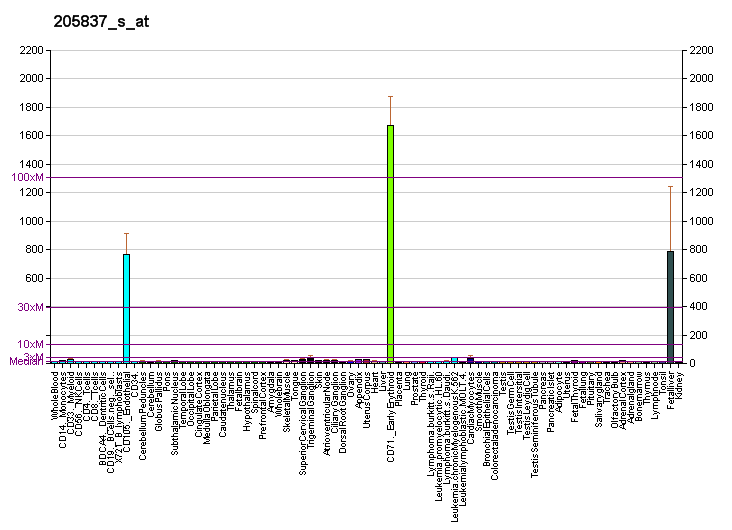
RNA expression pattern
Bgee	Human / Mouse (ortholog); Top expressed in: trabecular bone; bone marrow; bone marrow cell; testicle; monocyte; blood; Achilles tendon; ganglionic eminence; apex of heart; spleen / n/a; More reference expression data
BioGPS	More reference expression data
Gene ontology
Molecular function	identical protein binding; virus receptor activity; protein binding
Cellular component	integral component of membrane; plasma membrane; membrane
Biological process	viral entry into host cell; viral process; leukocyte migration
Sources:Amigo / QuickGO
Orthologs
Databases	NCBI: entry; OMA: entry
Species	Human	Mouse
Entrez	2993	n/a
Ensembl	ENSG00000170180	n/a
UniProt	P02724	n/a
RefSeq (mRNA)	NM_001308187; NM_001308190; NM_002099	n/a
RefSeq (protein)	NP_001295116; NP_001295119; NP_002090	n/a
Location (UCSC)	Chr 4: 144.11 – 144.14 Mb	n/a
PubMed search		n/a
- Wikidata
View/Edit Human

Glycophorin A (MNS blood group), also known as GYPA, is a protein which in humans is encoded by the GYPA gene. GYPA has also recently been designated CD235a (cluster of differentiation 235a).

== Function ==
Glycophorins A (GYPA; this protein) and B (GYPB) are major sialoglycoproteins of the human erythrocyte membrane which bear the antigenic determinants for the MN and Ss blood groups. In addition to the M or N and S or s antigens, that commonly occur in all populations, about 40 related variant phenotypes have been identified. These variants include all the variants of the Miltenberger complex and several isoforms of Sta; also, Dantu, Sat, He, Mg, and deletion variants Ena, S-s-U- and Mk. Most of the variants are the result of gene recombinations between GYPA and GYPB.

== Genomics ==
GypA, GypB and GypE are members of the same family and are located on the long arm of chromosome 4 (chromosome 4q31). The family evolved via two separate gene duplication events. The initial duplication gave rise to two genes one of subsequently evolved into GypA and the other which give rise via a second duplication event to GypB and GypE. These events appear to have occurred within a relatively short time span. The second duplication appears to have occurred via an unequal crossing over event.

The GypA gene itself consists of 7 exons and has 97% sequence homology with GypB and GypE from the 5' untranslated transcription region (UTR) to the coding sequence encoding the first 45 amino acids. The exon at this point encodes the transmembrane domain. Within the intron downstream of this pint is an Alu repeat. The cross over event which created the genes ancestral to GypA and GypB/E occurred within this region.

GypA can be found in all primates. GypB can be found only in gorillas and some of the higher primates suggesting that the duplication events occurred only recently.

== Molecular biology ==
There are about one million copies of this protein per erythrocyte.

== Blood groups ==
The MNS blood group was the second set of antigens discovered. M and N were identified in 1927 by Landsteiner and Levine. S and s in were described later in 1947.

The frequencies of these antigens are

- M: 78% Caucasoid; 74% African descent
- N: 72% Caucasoid; 75% African descent
- S: 55% Caucasoid; 31% African descent
- s: 89% Caucasoid; 93% African descent

== Molecular medicine ==
Glycophorins carry the M and N antigens for several human blood groups. Glycophorin can be split into two groups. The first group includes glycophorin A, B, and E which carry MN and Ss blood group antigens. These three proteins are structurally homologous and essentially erythroid specific. The second group includes glycophorin C and D which carry blood group Gerbich antigens. Through protein and nucleic acid analysis, it was determined that Glycophorin D is a truncation of Glycophorin C. There is an abundance in the sequence of threonine and serine that serve as binding sites for covalent carbohydrates. Glycophorin A and B carry MNS antigens and can serve as receptors for cytokines and pathogens. They can also serve as a receptor for the malaria parasite Plasmodium falciparum.

=== Transfusion medicine ===
The M and N antigens differ at two amino acid residues: the M allele has serine at position 1 (C at nucleotide 2) and glycine at position 5 (G at nucleotide 14) while the N allele has leucine at position 1 (T at nucleotide 2) and glutamate at position 5 (A at nucleotide 14). Both glycophorin A and B bind the Vicia graminea anti-N lectin.

There are about 40 known variants in the MNS blood group system. These have arisen largely as a result of mutations within the 4 kb region coding for the extracellular domain. These include the antigens Mg, Dantu, Henshaw (He), Miltenberger, Ny^{a}, Os^{a}, Orriss (Or), Raddon (FR) and Stones (St^{a}). Chimpanzees also have an MN blood antigen system. In chimpanzees M reacts strong but N only weakly.

=== Null mutants ===
In individuals who lack both glycophorin A and B the phenotype has been designated M^{k}.

=== Dantu antigen ===
The Dantu antigen was described in 1984. The Dantu antigen has an apparent molecular weight of 29 kilodaltons (kDa) and 99 amino acids. The first 39 amino acids of the Dantu antigen are derived from glycophorin B and residues 40-99 are derived from glycophorin A. Dantu is associated with very weak s antigen, a protease-resistant N antigen and either very weak or no U antigen. There are at least three variants: MD, NE and Ph. The Dantu phenotype occurs with a frequency of Dantu phenotype is ~0.005 in American Blacks and < 0.001 in Germans.

=== Henshaw antigen ===
The Henshaw (He) antigen is due to a mutation of the N terminal region. There are three differences in the first three amino acid residues: the usual form has Tryptophan_{1}-Serine-Threonine-Serine-Glycine_{5} while Henshaw has Leucine_{1}-Serine-Threonine-Threonine-Glutamate_{5}. This antigen is rare in Caucasians but occurs at a frequency of 2.1% in US and UK of African origin. It occurs at the rate of 7.0% in blacks in Natal and 2.7% in West Africans. At least 3 variants of this antigen have been identified.

=== Miltenberger subsystem ===
The Miltenberger (Mi) subsystem originally consisting of five phenotypes (Mi^{a}, V^{w}, Mur, Hil and Hut) now has 11 recognised phenotypes numbered I to XI (The antigen 'Mur' is named after to the patient the original serum was isolated from - a Mrs Murrel.) The name originally given to this complex refers to the reaction erythrocytes gave to the standard Miltenberger antisera used to test them. The subclasses were based on additional reactions with other standard antisera.

Mi-I (Mi^{a}), Mi-II(V^{w}), Mi-VII and Mi-VIII are carried on glycophorin A. Mi-I is due to a mutation at amino acid 28 (threonine to methionine: C→T at nucleotide 83) resulting in a loss of the glycosylation at the asparagine_{26} residue. Mi-II is due to a mutation at amino acid 28 (threonine to lysine:C->A at nucleotide 83). Similar to the case of Mi-I this mutation results in a loss of the glycosylation at the asparagine_{26} residue. This alteration in glycoslation is detectable by the presence of a new 32kDa glycoprotein stainable with PAS. Mi-VII is due to a double mutation in glycophorin A converting an arginine residue into a threonine residue and a tyrosine residue into a serine at the positions 49 and 52 respectively. The threonine-49 residue is glycosylated. This appears to be the origin of one of the Mi-VII specific antigens (Anek) which is known to lie between residues 40-61 of glycophorin A and comprises sialic acid residue(s) attached to O-glycosidically linked oligosaccharide(s). This also explains the loss of a high frequency antigen ((EnaKT)) found in normal glycophorin A which is located within the residues 46–56. Mi-VIII is due to a mutation at amino acid residue 49 (arginine->threonine). M-VIII shares the Anek determinant with MiVII. Mi-III, Mi-VI and Mi-X are due to rearrangements of glycophorin A and B in the order GlyA (alpha)-GlyB (delta)-GlyA (alpha). Mil-IX in contrast is a reverse alpha-delta-alpha hybrid gene. Mi-V, MiV(J.L.) and St^{a} are due to unequal but homologous crossing-over between alpha and delta glycophorin genes. The MiV and MiV(J.L.) genes are arranged in the same 5' alpha-delta 3' frame whereas St^{a} gene is in a reciprocal 5'delta-alpha 3' configuration.

The incidence of Mi-I in Thailand is 9.7%.

Peptide constructs representative of Mi^{a} mutations MUT and MUR have been attached onto red blood cells (known as kodecytes) and are able to detect antibodies against these Miltenberger antigens

Although uncommon in Caucasians (0.0098%) and Japanese (0.006%), the frequency of Mi-III is exceptionally high in several Taiwanese aboriginal tribes (up to 90%). In contrast its frequency is 2-3% in Han Taiwanese (Minnan). The Mi-III phenotype occurs in 6.28% of Hong Kong Chinese.

Mi-IX (MNS32) occurs with a frequency of 0.43% in Denmark.

=== Stone's antigen ===
Stones (St^{a}) has been shown to be the product of a hybrid gene of which the 5'-half is derived from the glycophorin B whereas the 3'-half is derived from the glycophorin A. Several isoforms are known. This antigen is now considered to be part of the Miltenberger complex.

=== Sat antigen ===
A related antigen is Sat. This gene has six exons of which exon I to exon IV are identical to the N allele of glycophorin A whereas its 3' portion, including exon V and exon VI, are derived from the glycophorin B gene. The mature protein SAT protein contains 104 amino acid residues.

=== Orriss antigen ===
Orriss (Or) appears to be a mutant of glycophorin A but its precise nature has not yet been determined.

=== Mg antigen ===
The Mg antigen is carried on glycophorin A and lacks three O-glycolated side chains.

=== Os antigen ===
Os^{a} (MNS38) is due to a mutation at nucleotide 273 (C->T) lying within exon 3 resulting in the replacement of a proline residue with a serine.

=== Ny antigen ===
Ny^{a} (MNS18) is due to a mutation at nucleotide 194 (T->A) which results in the substitution of an aspartate residue with a glutamate.

=== Reactions ===
Anti-M although occurring naturally has rarely been implicated in transfusion reactions. Anti-N is not considered to cause transfusion reactions. Severe reactions have been reported with anti-Miltenberger. Anti Mi-I (Vw) and Mi-III has been recognised as a cause of haemolytic disease of the newborn. Raddon has been associated with severe transfusion reactions.

== Relevance for infection ==
The Wright b antigen (Wrb) is located on glycophorin A and acts as a receptor for the malaria parasite Plasmodium falciparum. Cells lacking glycophorins A (En^{a}) are resistant to invasion by this parasite. The erythrocyte binding antigen 175 of P. falciparum recognises the terminal Neu5Ac(alpha 2-3)Gal-sequences of glycophorin A.

Several viruses bind to glycophorin A including hepatitis A virus (via its capsid), bovine parvovirus, Sendai virus, influenza A and B, group C rotavirus, encephalomyocarditis virus and reoviruses.

== See also ==
- Glycophorin
