= Pronase =

Pronase is a commercially available mixture of proteases isolated from the extracellular fluid of Streptomyces griseus. Activity extends to both denatured and native proteins leading to complete or nearly complete digestion into individual amino acids.

One site that it cleaves at is the inactivation gate of Na+ voltage gated ion channels in neurons.

Pronase is under investigation as a way to improve image quality in gastroscopy by thinning the mucus in advance.

== See also ==
- Proteinase K
