= Vicia graminea =

Scientific classification
- Kingdom: Plantae
- Clade: Tracheophytes
- Clade: Angiosperms
- Clade: Eudicots
- Clade: Rosids
- Order: Fabales
- Family: Fabaceae
- Subfamily: Faboideae
- Genus: Vicia
- Species: V. graminea

Binomial name
- Vicia graminea Sm.

Synonyms
- Ervum gramineum (Sm.) Stank.

Species of plant in the legume family

Vicia graminea is a species of flowering plant in the vetch genus Vicia, family Fabaceae. It is native to South America, where it has a meandering distribution in Colombia, Peru, Bolivia, Paraguay, northeast Argentina, southern Brazil, Uruguay, and southern Chile. It is the source for a lectin that is used to identify the N blood group antigen.

== Subtaxa ==
The following subtaxa are accepted:

- Vicia graminea var. graminea – entire range
- Vicia graminea var. nigricarpa N.R.Bastos & Miotto – southern Brazil
- Vicia graminea var. transiens Burkart – northeast Argentina, Uruguay
