= Tadeusz Baranowski (chemist) =

Polish chemist

Tadeusz Baranowski

Tadeusz Baranowski (Polish pronunciation: [taˈdɛ.uʐ baraˈnɔfskʲi]; September 13, 1910 in Lwów – March 24, 1993 in Wrocław) was a Polish chemist. From 1965 to 1968 he was the rector of Wrocław Medical University.

== Biography ==
In 1933 he graduated from the Faculty of Medicine at the Jan Kazimierz University in Lviv, and then stayed at the university, under the supervision of Jakub Parnas, where he conducted research in the field of biochemistry, including studies on ammonia. In the years 1935–1937 he worked as a researcher at the Stefan Batory University in Vilnius, then until the outbreak of World War II at the Jan Kazimierz University in Lviv.

On April 20, 1939, he obtained his habilitation at the Faculty of Law of the Jagiellonian University in Kraków. In 1939, simultaneously with Max Perutz, he conducted the crystallisation of proteins and planned their X-ray examinations, which were not performed due to the outbreak of World War II.

During the Soviet occupation, he headed the department of physiological chemistry at the Medical Institute of Lviv, and during the German occupation, the Staatliche Medizinische und Naturwissenschaftliche Fachkurse.

After the liberation of Poland, he moved to Wrocław, and in 1947 he isolated and described the enzyme phosphoglycerol dehydrogenase, known then as the Baranowski enzyme, and now known as glycerol-3-phosphate dehydrogenase (GPDH).

Until 1950 he was the head of the department of physiological chemistry at the University of Wrocław, and then for 20 years at the Medical Academy in Wrocław . In the years 1965-1968 he was also the rector of this university. In the 1950s, he initiated the industrial production of adrenocorticotropic hormone (ACTH) preparations in Poland.

From 1970 he was the director of the Institute of Biochemistry and Biophysics for the next 10 years, and the Institute of Physiology and Biochemistry for the next year. He was a member of the Polish Academy of Sciences.
