= MNS antigen system =

Human blood group classification

The MNS antigen system is a human blood group system based upon two genes (glycophorin A and glycophorin B) on chromosome 4. There are currently 50 antigens in the system, but the five most important are called M, N, S, s, and U.

The system can be thought of as two separate groups: the M and N antigens are at one location on the ECM and S, s, and U are on a closely related location. The two groups are very closely located together on chromosome 4 and are inherited as a haplotype.

== The MN blood group ==
The MN blood group in humans is under the control of a pair of co-dominant alleles, L^{M} and L^{N}. Most people in the Inuit population are M/M, while this genotype is rare among Indigenous Australians. In fact, they tend to possess the opposite genotype (N/N).

The MN blood group system is under the control of an autosomal locus found on chromosome 4, with two alleles designated L^{M} and L^{N}. The blood type is due to a glycoprotein present on the surface of a red blood cell (RBC), which behaves as a native antigen. Phenotypic expression at this locus is codominant because an individual may exhibit either one or both antigenic substances. Frequencies of the two alleles vary widely among human populations.

M+ and N+ RBCs are common (75% of population) and M+N+ cells are the most common genotype (50% of population). These antigens were an early discovery and are some of the oldest blood antigens known after the ABO system. They were first described by Karl Landsteiner and Philip Levine in 1927. Anti-M and anti-N antibodies are usually IgM and are rarely associated with transfusion reactions.

Anti-N is sometimes seen in dialysis patients due to cross-reactions with the residual formaldehyde from sterilizing the equipment. This is usually irrelevant for transfusion since this variant of the antibody does not react at body temperature.

== The U and Ss groups ==
The S antigen is relatively common (~55% of the population) and the s antigen is very common (~89% of the population). Anti-S and anti-s can cause hemolytic transfusion reactions and hemolytic disease of the newborn.The U antigen is a high incidence antigen, occurring in more than 99.9% of the population. The U was originally short for "Universal", though this is not the case. U negative RBCs can be found in people of African descent. This mutation in red cell surface structure also makes the RBCs S- and s-. Anti-U has been associated with both hemolytic transfusion reactions and hemolytic disease of the newborn.

== Other MNS antigens ==
The other 41 identified antigens in the MNS group are low incidence, such as He (0.8% of the population) or high incidence, such as EN^{a} (>99.9% of the population).

== MNS glycoproteins and genes ==
Antigens of the MNS system are located on one of two glycoproteins: glycophorin A (GPA, CD235A) and glycophorin B (GPB, CD235B). Each glycoprotein crosses the membrane once and has an external N-terminal domain (varying in length from 44 amino acids for GPB to 72 amino acids in length for GPA) as well as a C-terminal cytosolic domain (GPB, 8 amino acids in length; GPA, 36 amino acids in length).

== Clinical diagnostic ==
Clinical testing in patient care for MNS antigens follows published minimum quality and operational requirements, similar to red cell genotyping for any of the other recognized blood group systems. Molecular analysis can identify gene variants (alleles) that may affect MNS antigens expression on the red cell membrane.

== MNS antibodies ==
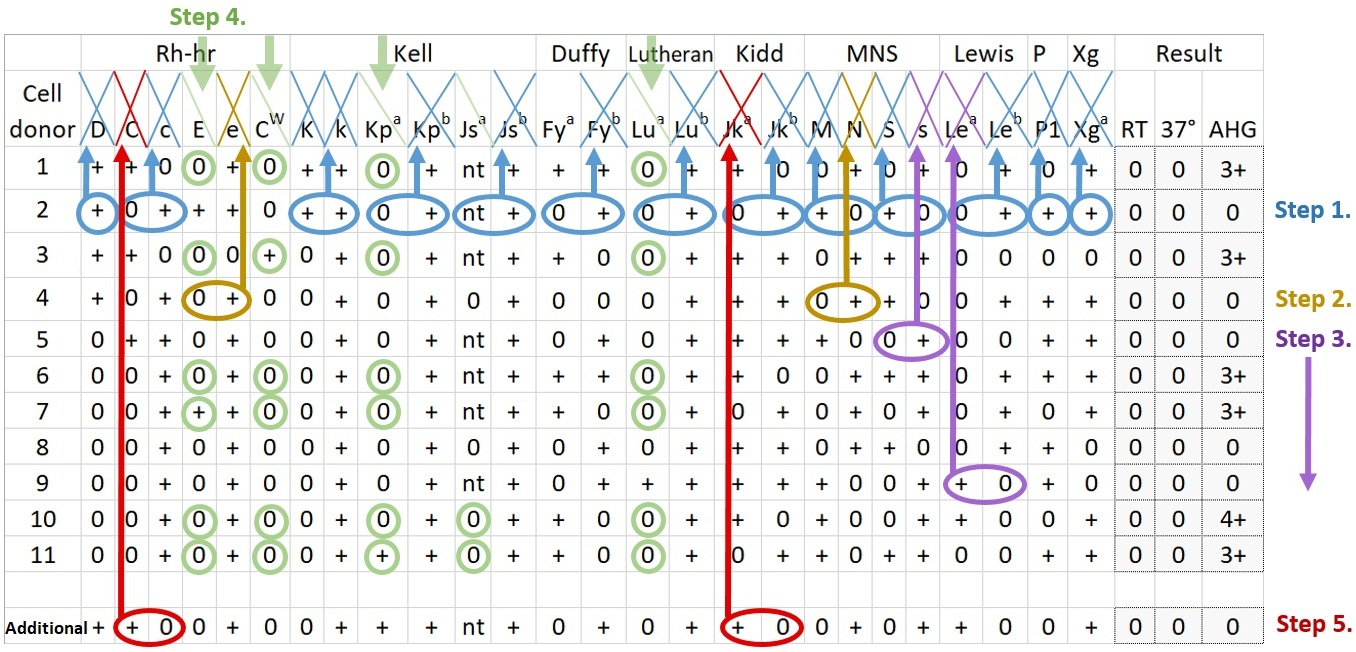
Interpretation of antibody panel to detect patient antibodies towards the most relevant human blood group systems, including MNS.

- MNS antibodies display dosage (they react stronger against cells which are homozygous vs heterozygous for the antigen in question).
- Anti-M and anti-N antibodies are naturally occurring, cold-reacting IgM-class antibodies.
- Anti-M and anti-N are generally clinically insignificant.
- Anti-S, anti-s and anti-U antibodies are acquired following exposure (via pregnancy or past transfusion with blood products) and are warm-reacting IgG-class antibodies.
- Anti-S, anti-s and anti-U are usually clinically significant.
