= Wrocław Medical University =

University in Wrocław, Poland

- Uniwersytet Medyczny im. Piastów Śląskich we Wrocławiu
- Latin: Universitas Medica Vratislaviensis
- Type: Public
- Established: 1950; 76 years ago
- Accreditation: Polish Accreditation Committee (PKA)
- Academic affiliations: AMEE; EUA; IROs Forum
- Rector: Piotr Ponikowski
- Students: 6,411 (12.2023)
- Location: Wrocław, Lower Silesian Voivodeship, Poland; 51°06′32″N 17°04′08″E
- Colours: Gold, Black
- Website: www.umw.edu.pl

University rankings

Global – Overall
- ARWU World: 901-1000 (2024)
- CWUR World: 893 (2024)
- CWTS World: 742 (2024)
- THE World: 501-600 (2025)

Global – Life sciences and medicine
- THE Clinical and Health: 301-400 (2025)

Wrocław Medical University (Polish: Uniwersytet Medyczny we Wrocławiu, Latin: Universitas Medicus Vratislaviensis) is an institution of higher medical education in Wrocław, Poland.

It consists of six faculties: Medicine, Medicine and Dentistry, Pharmacy, Health Sciences, Nursing and Midwifery, and Physiotherapy. There are nearly 200 chairs, departments, and clinics. Altogether, about 6,400 students study there, and 300 PhD students.

Wrocław Medical University has 22 international agreements of cooperation signed with other universities abroad. There is a wide exchange of students and teaching staff within the framework of the Socrates and Erasmus programmes of the European Union, especially with France, Germany, Italy, Sweden, Spain, the Netherlands and England.

== History ==
Wrocław is a city with a rich medical tradition. The first hospital was founded in the 13th century. Medicine was first taught in 1745 by the establishment of the Collegium Medico-Chirurgicum. It was the first medical school in the city.

The traditions of Wrocław Medical University date back to 1811, when the Viadrina University (Brandenburg University of Frankfurt) in Frankfurt (Oder) was relocated to Wrocław by order of Prussian King Friedrich Wilhelm III. It merged with the local Leopoldine Academy, which did not have a medical faculty, to create the University of Wrocław. Among its five faculties was the Faculty of Medicine, transferred from Frankfurt (Oder) and headed by its dean, Prof. Dr. Karl Berends, who became the rector of the Royal University of Wrocław in 1811. This connection traces the university's origins back to 1506, when the four-faculty Brandenburg University of Frankfurt, including medicine, was established.

Many famous doctors lived and worked in Wrocław such as Alois Alzheimer - neurologist and psychiatrist, who presented his findings regarding degeneration of the brain cortex (Alzheimer's disease), Robert Koch - creator of modern bacteriology (Nobel Prize in 1905), Paul Ehrlich - pioneer of present chemotherapy (Nobel Prize in 1908).

At present Wrocław is an active centre of medical education. The Medical University also performs a wide range of scientific activities and provides the whole region of Lower Silesia with highly specialised medical care.

=== Post-War Reconstruction and Early Development ===
After World War II, significant efforts were made to restore and rebuild university buildings, as 70% of the city was destroyed. The Faculty of Medicine was established in 1945 as part of the University of Wrocław and Polytechnic of Wrocław. Professor Ludwik Hirszfeld served as the first dean and delivered the inaugural lecture. Initially, 467 students enrolled in the faculty.

On January 1, 1950, the Faculty of Medicine became part of the newly established Wrocław Medical University, then a Medical Academy, which included the Medical and Pharmaceutical Faculties. Professor Antoni Falkiewicz served as the dean during this transition, with student enrollment increasing to 2,100.

=== Faculty of Medicine ===
The Faculty of Medicine is the oldest faculty at the Medical University of Wroclaw, established on November 14, 1945. The scientific staff consisted mainly of professors from the Jan Kazimierz University in Lviv.

The Faculty of Medicine has seen several structural changes, including the establishment of the Department of Dentistry in 1948 and the Department of Pediatrics from 1954 to 1966. In 1992, the Faculty of Postgraduate Medical Education was created, followed by the Faculty of Medicine and Dentistry in 2000. In 2003, the English Division was established to educate international students.

Notable achievements at the Faculty of Medicine include the first open-heart surgery in Poland, performed by Professor Wiktor Bross on February 12, 1958, and the first kidney transplant from a living donor on March 31, 1966 together with Prof. Wladyslaw Wrezlewicz. The faculty has also made significant contributions in microbiology, biochemistry, enzymology, and experimental surgery, earning state prizes for its research. A great number of prominent scientists have conducted research at the Faculty of Medicine, including Professors Ludwik Hirszfeld, Zygmunt Albert, Edward Szczeklik, Witold Orłowski, Stefan Ślopek, as well as Hugon and Zofia Kowarzyk.

=== Faculty of Pharmacy ===
The Faculty of Pharmacy at the Medical University of Wroclaw began operations shortly after World War II, with a group of scientists from the Jan Kazimierz University in Lvov leading the initiative. The Pharmaceutical Department was established in 1946 as part of the Faculty of Medicine of Wrocław University and Polytechnic, becoming an independent Faculty of Pharmacy in January 1950 under the Medical Academy.

Professor Tadeusz Baranowski served as the first director, with Professor Bogusław Bobrański as his deputy. The faculty initially operated from a reconstructed building on Szewska Street, formerly the German Pharmaceutical Institute.

In the 1979/80 academic year, the Department of Medical Analytics was established to train laboratory diagnosticians. In 2012, the faculty moved to new, modern facilities on Borowska Street.

=== Faculty of Medicine and Dentistry ===
The Faculty of Medicine and Dentistry was established on May 24, 2000, and began operations on October 1, 2000. It was created from the former Faculty of Dentistry within the Faculty of Medicine. The faculty received accreditation for its dentistry program in June 2003, renewed in October 2008, and was authorized to confer doctoral degrees in dentistry and medicine. The faculty introduced English-language classes in the 2005/06 academic year. The first English Division graduates received their dental diplomas in the 2010/11 academic year.

=== Faculty of Health Sciences ===
The Faculty of Health Sciences traces its roots to the post-war establishment of the University and Polytechnic in 1948. Initially part of the Faculty of Medicine, it became part of the Medical Academy in 1950. The faculty was originally located on Worcella Street and is now situated at 5 Bartla Street.

In response to national demands, higher nursing studies were established across Poland, leading to the creation of the Faculty of Nursing at the Wroclaw Medical Academy in 1978. The faculty initially comprised four departments and introduced a master's program in 1979. In 2008, it was renamed the Faculty of Health Sciences and expanded its educational offerings to include nursing, midwifery, physiotherapy, public health, and emergency medical services.

=== Recent Structural Changes ===
On July 31, 2024, structural changes were implemented, establishing the Faculty of Nursing and Midwifery and the Faculty of Physiotherapy, along with adjustments to the Faculty of Health Sciences.

== Campus ==
=== Medical Facilities ===
- Jan Mikulicz-Radecki University Clinical Hospital in Wroclaw: A multispecialty hospital established in 2002, named after Jan Mikulicz-Radecki. It consists of 25 clinics, 29 departments, operating theaters, and numerous laboratories, providing primary and specialized healthcare services. The hospital also conducts research and trains medical professionals.
- Academic Dental Polyclinic: Established in 2003, this facility offers comprehensive dental services and focuses on scientific work, clinical practice, and teaching.
- Research, Scientific and Didactic Center for Dementia Diseases in Ścinawa: A center dedicated to the study and treatment of dementia diseases.

=== Museums ===
- Museum of Pharmacy: Part of the Faculty of Pharmacy, this museum showcases the history of pharmacy and medicine. Housed in a historic Renaissance-Classical building, it features exhibits ranging from an alchemical laboratory in the basement, through the interior of the Renaissance pharmacy on the first floor, the exhibition devoted to natural medicine and ancient tools for the production of medicines, to the exposition showing analytical measuring apparatus and synthetic and semi-synthetic drugs on the second floor.
- Museum of Forensic Medicine: Part of the Department of Forensic Medicine, this museum continues the traditions of the former German Museum of Forensic Medicine, established in 1887. It houses a collection of exhibits related to forensic science, including historical artifacts, medical instruments, and preserved human specimens.

== Organization ==
Wrocław Medical University is governed by a rector and six vice-rectors. Each faculty is led by a dean and one to four vice-deans.

The university's Senate, comprising 30 members, is the key decision-making body, responsible for approving statutes, setting strategy, and granting academic degrees. The Senate includes professors, academic teachers, students, doctoral students, and non-academic employees. It ensures the university operates in accordance with laws and statutes.

The university has three councils for scientific disciplines:

- Council for the Discipline of Medical Sciences (60 members)
- Council for the Discipline of Pharmaceutical Sciences (28 members)
- Council for the Discipline of Health Sciences (25 members)

These councils oversee research, education, and quality evaluation within their respective fields.

Additionally, the university has:

- A Bioethics Committee (16 members) that evaluates the ethical aspects of scientific research and clinical trials.
- An Ethics Committee (15 members) that monitors and enforces ethical principles within the academic community.

=== Faculties ===
- Faculty of Medicine
- Faculty of Medicine and Dentistry
- Faculty of Pharmacy
- Faculty of Health Sciences
- Faculty of Nursing and Midwifery
- Faculty of Physiotherapy

Wroclaw Medical University also has a branch in Wałbrzych that offers a Medicine programme.

== Rectors ==
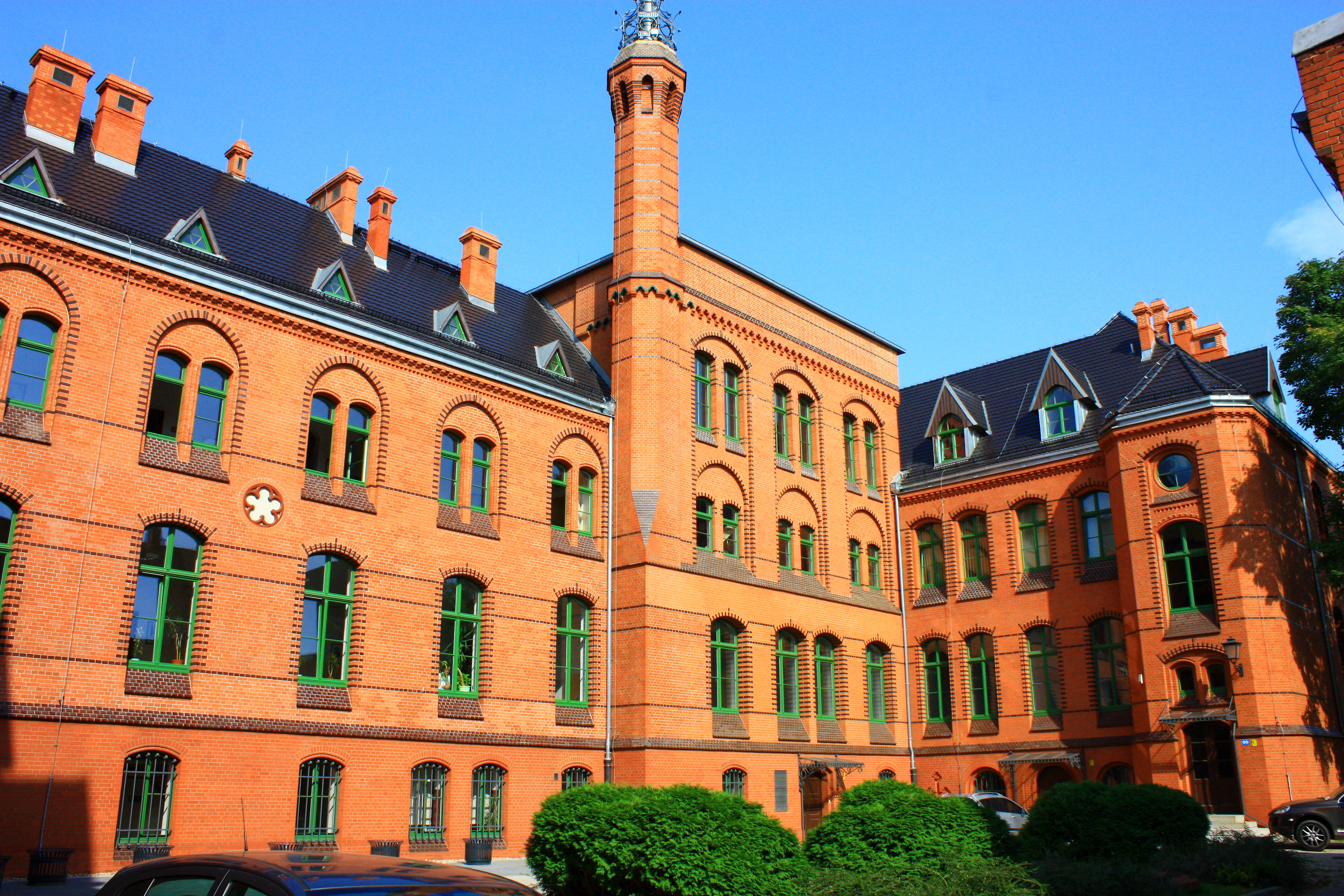
Collegium Anatomicum of the Wrocław Medical University

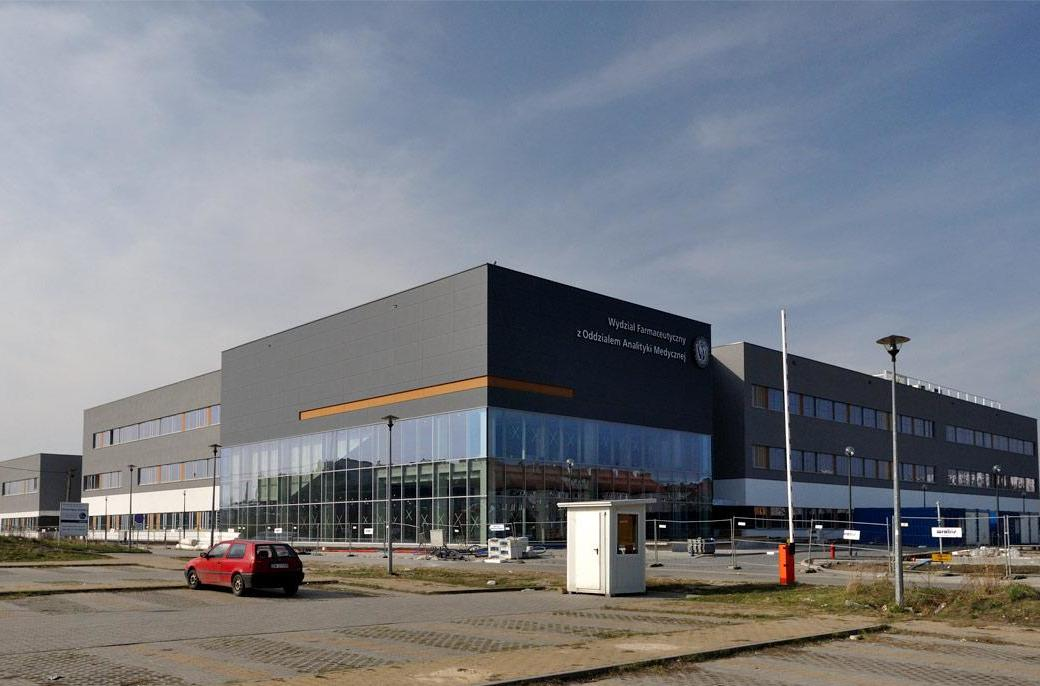
Pharmaceutical Research Center

- Zygmunt Albert (1950–1954)
- Antoni Falkiewicz (1954–1957)
- Bogusław Bobrański (1957–1962)
- Aleksander Kleczeński (1962–1965)
- Tadeusz Baranowski (1965–1968)
- Leonard Kuczyński (1968–1972)
- Stanisław Iwankiewicz (1972–1978)
- Eugeniusz Rogalski (1978–1981)
- Marian Wilimowski (1981–1987)
- Bogdan Łazarkiewicz (1987–1990)
- Zbigniew Kapnik (1990–1993)
- Jerzy Czernik (1993–1999)
- Leszek Paradowski (1999–2005)
- Ryszard Andrzejak (2005-2011)
- Marek Ziętek (2011–December 18, 2018; March 15, 2019 - August 27, 2019)
- Piotr Ponikowski (2020-2024)

Acting rectors:

- Marek Ziętek (Acting: 2010 - April, 2011)
- Jerzy Rudnicki (Acting: April, 2011 - May, 2011)
- Piotr Ponikowski (Acting: December 18, 2018 - January 18, 2019)
- Halina Grajeta (Acting: January 18, 2019 - February 12, 2019̣)
- Piotr Ponikowski (Acting: February 12, 2019 - March 15, 2019)
- Piotr Ponikowski (Acting: August 27, 2019 - 2020)

== Research ==
=== Biobank ===
The Biobank of the Medical University of Wroclaw was established on December 15, 2017. It operates within the Laboratory for Biological Activity Screening and Collection of Biological Material. The biobank holds accreditations and certifications, including EN ISO 20387:2021-01 and ISO 9001:2015.

The biobank's resources are listed in the European BBMRI-ERIC Directory and the Polish directory.

=== University Clinical Research Support Center ===
The University Clinical Research Support Center offers support in planning, coordinating, and managing clinical trials. It focuses on non-commercial trials and is funded by the Medical Research Agency. The Center also provides training for new researchers through postgraduate studies in collaboration with the Medical Research Agency and the Association for Good Clinical Research Practice in Poland.
