= Anemia =

Reduced ability of blood to carry oxygen

- Other names: Anaemia, erythrocytopenia
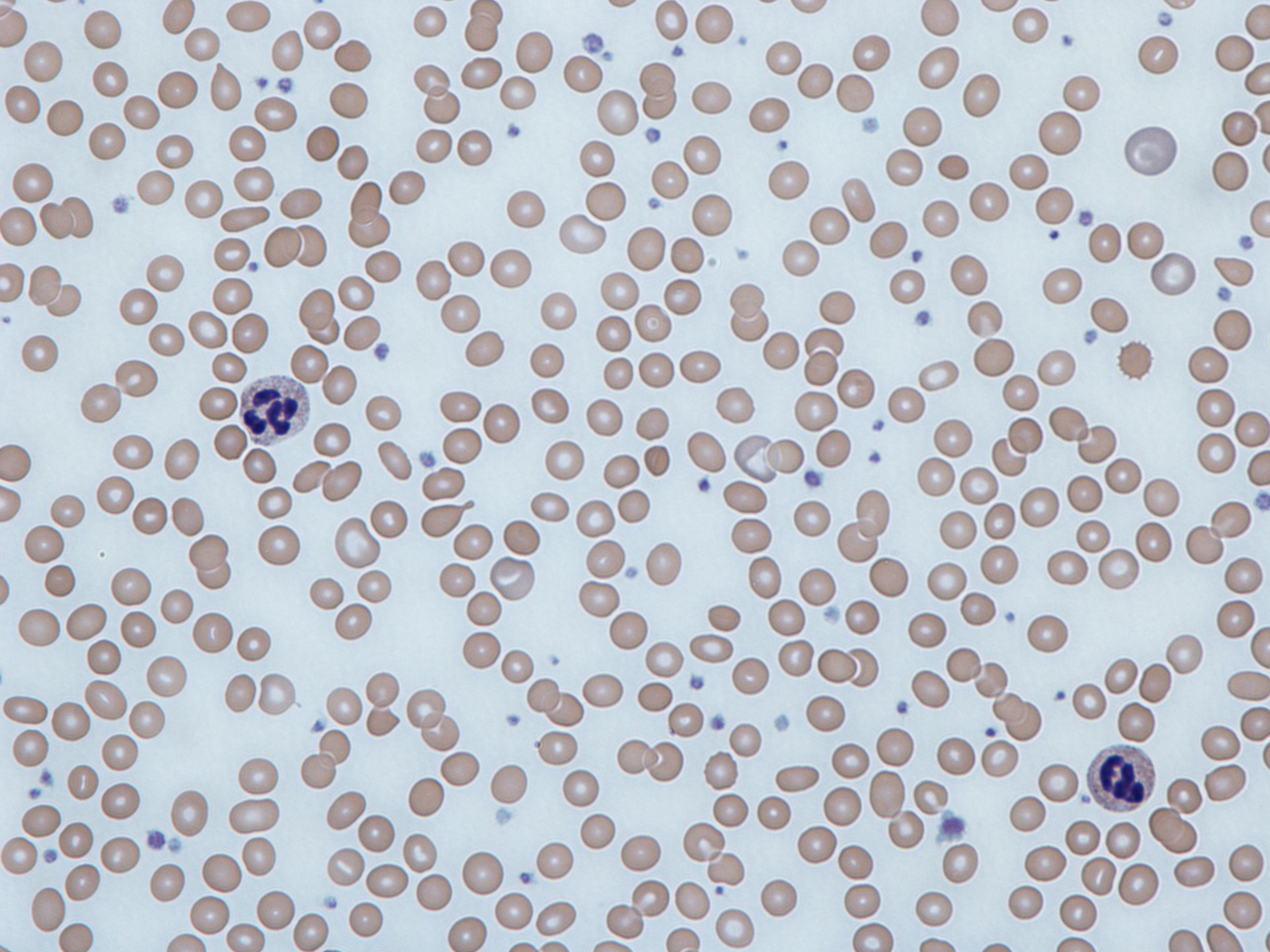
- Blood smear showing iron-deficiency anemia, with small, pale red blood cells
- Pronunciation: /əˈniːmiə/
- Specialty: Hematology
- Symptoms: Feeling tired, pale skin, weakness, shortness of breath, feeling faint
- Causes: Blood loss, decreased red blood cell production, increased red blood cell breakdown
- Diagnostic method: Blood hemoglobin measurement
- Frequency: 1.92 billion / 24% (2021)

Anemia (also spelt anaemia in British English) is a blood disorder in which the blood has a reduced ability to carry oxygen. This can be due to a lower than normal number of red blood cells, a reduction in the amount of hemoglobin available for oxygen transport, or abnormalities in hemoglobin that impair its function.

When anemia comes on slowly, the symptoms are often vague, such as tiredness, weakness, shortness of breath, headaches, and a reduced ability to exercise. When anemia is acute, symptoms may include confusion, feeling like one is going to pass out, loss of consciousness, and increased thirst. Anemia must be significant before a person becomes noticeably pale. Additional symptoms may occur depending on the underlying cause. Anemia can be temporary or long-term and can range from mild to severe.

Anemia can be caused by blood loss, decreased red blood cell production, and increased red blood cell breakdown. Causes of blood loss include menstruation, bleeding due to inflammation of the stomach or intestines, bleeding from surgery, serious injury, or blood donation. Causes of decreased production include iron deficiency, folate deficiency, vitamin B_{12} deficiency, thalassemia and a number of bone marrow tumors. Causes of increased breakdown include genetic disorders such as sickle cell anemia, infections such as malaria, and certain autoimmune diseases like autoimmune hemolytic anemia.

Anemia can also be classified based on the size of the red blood cells and amount of hemoglobin in each cell. If the cells are small, it is called microcytic anemia; if they are large, it is called macrocytic anemia; and if they are normal sized, it is called normocytic anemia. The diagnosis of anemia in men is based on a hemoglobin of less than 130 g/L; in non-pregnant women, it is less than 120 g/L, while in pregnant women it is less than 105–110. Further testing is then required to determine the cause.

Treatment depends on the specific cause. Certain groups of individuals, such as pregnant women, can benefit from the use of iron pills for prevention. Dietary supplementation, without determining the specific cause, is not recommended. The use of blood transfusions is typically based on a person's signs and symptoms. In those without symptoms, they are not recommended unless hemoglobin levels are less than 60 to 80 g/L (6 to 8 g/dL). These recommendations may also apply to some people with acute bleeding. Erythropoiesis-stimulating agents are only recommended in those with severe anemia.

Anemia is the most common blood disorder, affecting about a fifth to a third of the global population. Iron-deficiency anemia is the most common cause of anemia worldwide, and affects nearly one billion people. In 2013, anemia due to iron deficiency resulted in about 183,000 deaths – down from 213,000 deaths in 1990. This condition is most prevalent in children with also an above average prevalence in elderly and women of reproductive age (especially during pregnancy). Women aged 15 to 49 years experienced an increase in the global prevalence from 27.6% to 30.7% between 2012 and 2023 with either no improvement or an increase in prevalence in nearly all regions. In 2025, the WHO noted a rate of 35.5% in pregnant women, compared with 30.5% in non-pregnant women, along with a rate of almost 40% in children aged under 5 years.

Anemia is one of the six WHO global nutrition targets for 2025 and for diet-related global targets endorsed by World Health Assembly in 2012 and 2013. Efforts to reach global targets contribute to reaching Sustainable Development Goals (SDGs), with anemia as one of the targets in SDG 2 for achieving zero world hunger.

== Signs and symptoms ==
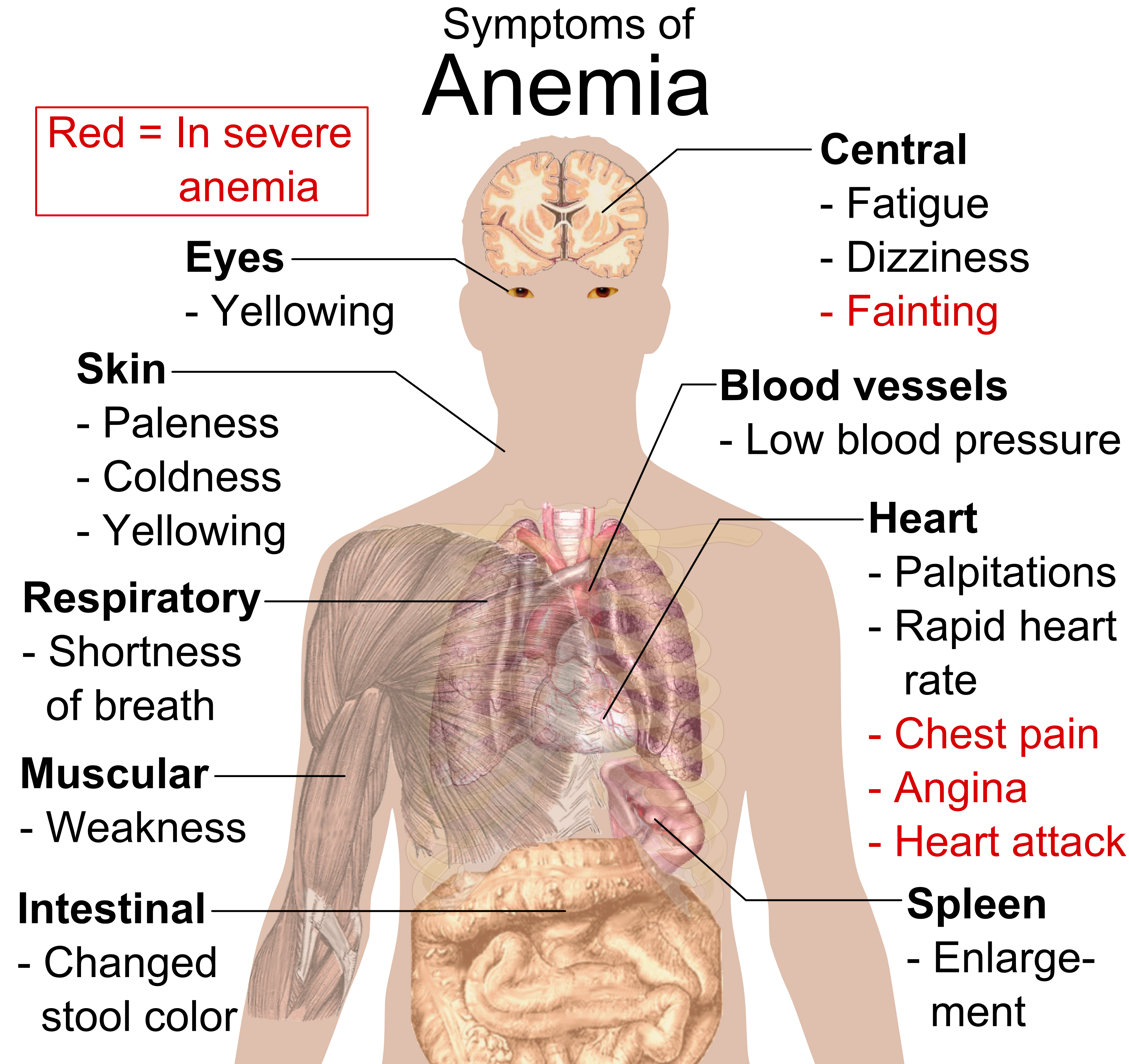
Main symptoms that may appear in anemia

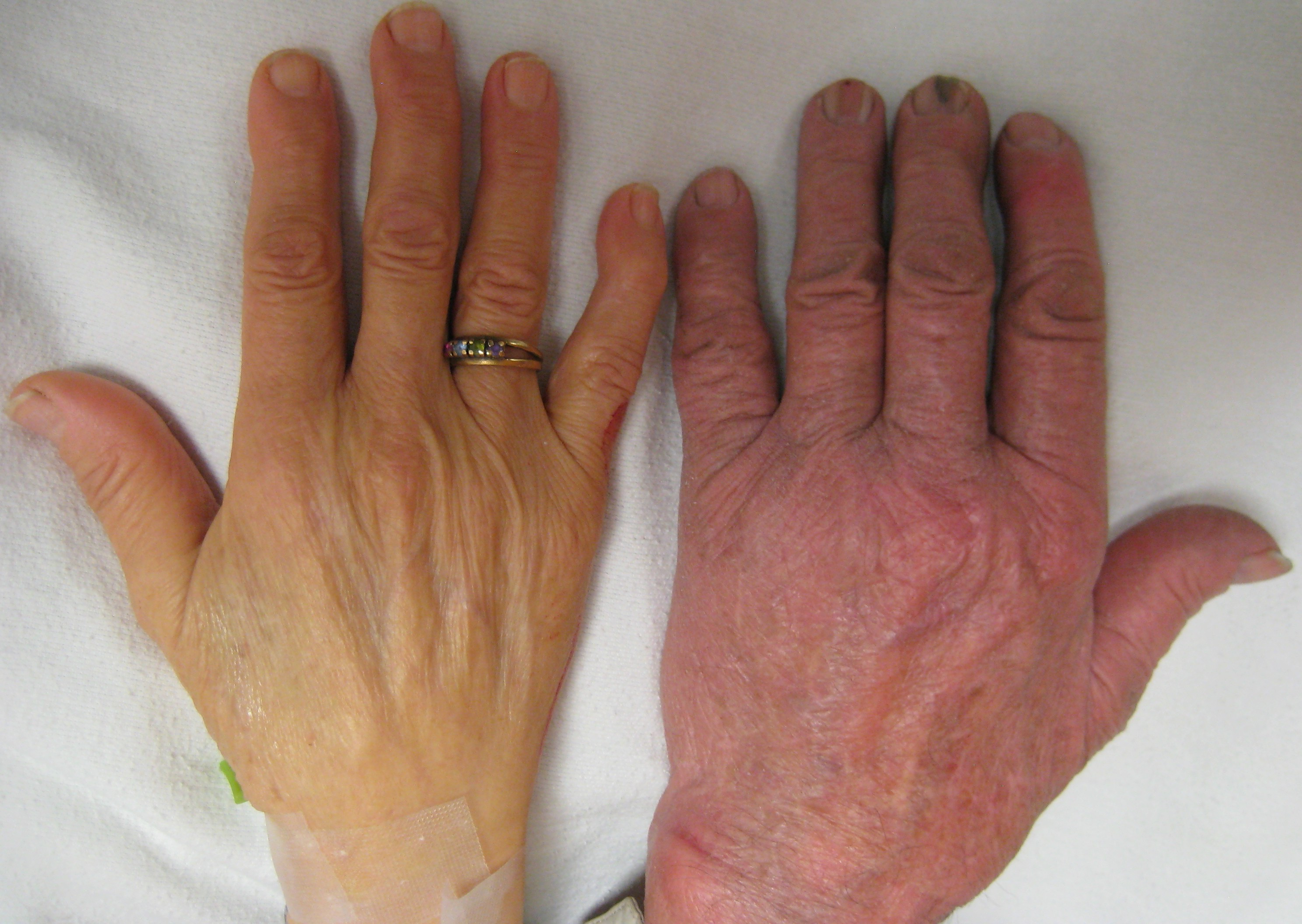
The hand of a person with severe anemia (on the left, with ring) compared to the hand of a person without anemia (on the right)

Symptoms of anemia can come on quickly or slowly. If the anemia develops slowly (chronic), the body may adapt and compensate for this change up to a point. In this case, no symptoms may appear until the anemia becomes more severe. General symptoms of mild anemia can include feeling tired, weak, dizziness, headaches, shortness of breath, and pale or yellowish skin.

Acute anemia, often caused by blood loss (hemorrhagic shock) has more severe symptoms, including rapid heartbeat, low blood pressure, and confusion.

The body may compensate for the lack of oxygen-carrying capability of the blood by increasing cardiac output. Symptoms may include palpitations, angina (if pre-existing heart disease is present), difficulty walking, and symptoms of heart failure. In severe anemia, there may be signs of a hyperdynamic circulation: tachycardia (a fast heart rate), bounding pulse, flow murmurs, and cardiac ventricular hypertrophy (enlargement).

Pallor resulting from severe anemia may be visible in the hand palms and fingernails beds, although it may be difficult to detect in dark toned skin. Other locations to detect pallor are the inner lining of the lower eyelid and the tongue.

Other symptoms associated with anemia depend on the underlying cause of the disorder; for example -

- Chronic iron-deficiency anemia may be associated with symptoms that can include spoon-shaped nails, sore or abnormally smooth tongue, hair loss, or pica (the desire to eat things which are not food, such as ice or earth).
- Anemia caused by vitamin B_{12} deficiency may be associated with psychological problems such as anxiety and confusion, memory loss, and depression.

=== Long term consequences ===
Maternal anemia during pregnancy is associated with detrimental effects such as low birth weight and preterm birth. Chronic anemia in infants may result in poor growth and impaired neurological development.

== Diagnosis ==
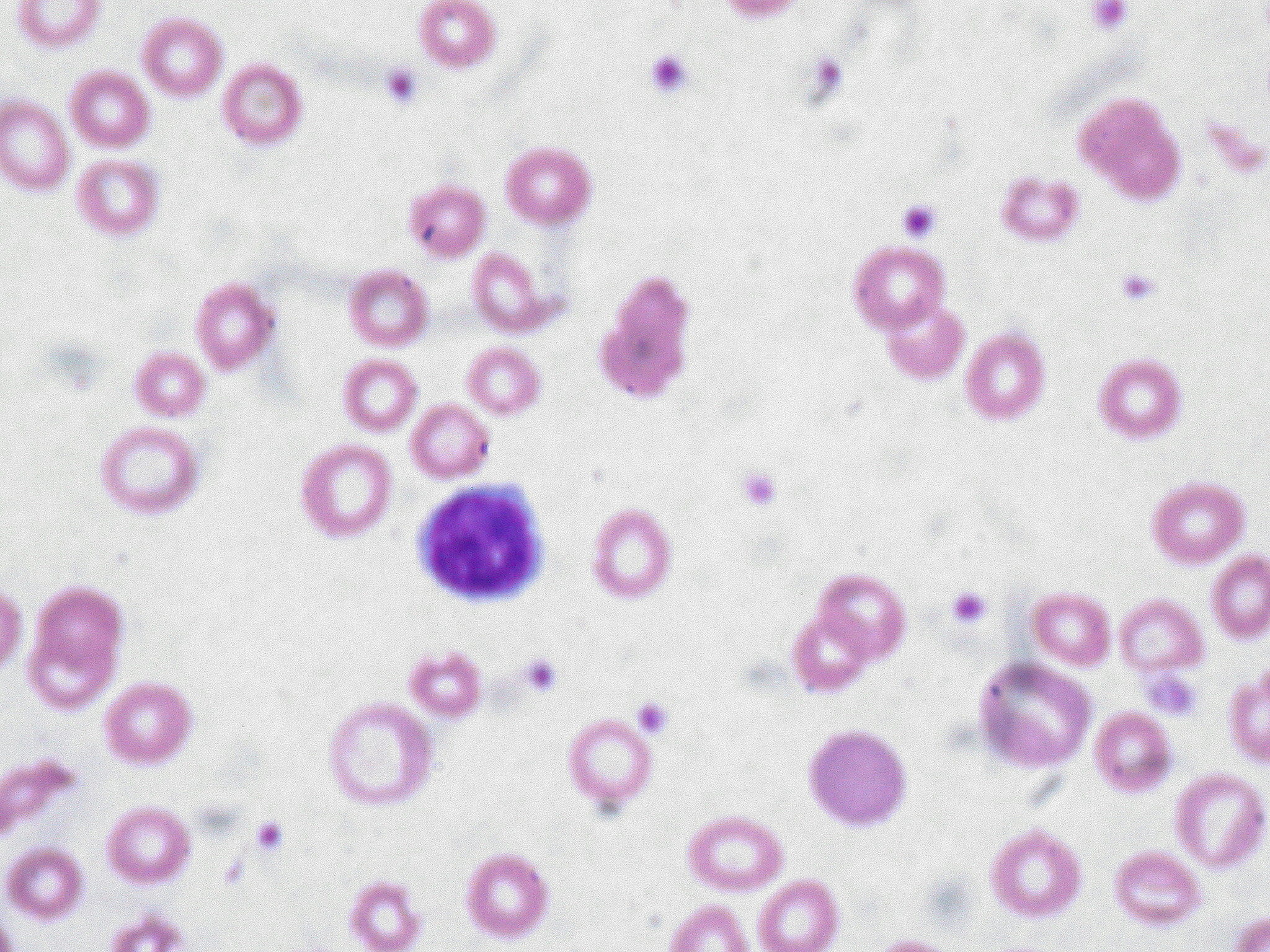
Peripheral blood smear microscopy of a patient with iron-deficiency anemia

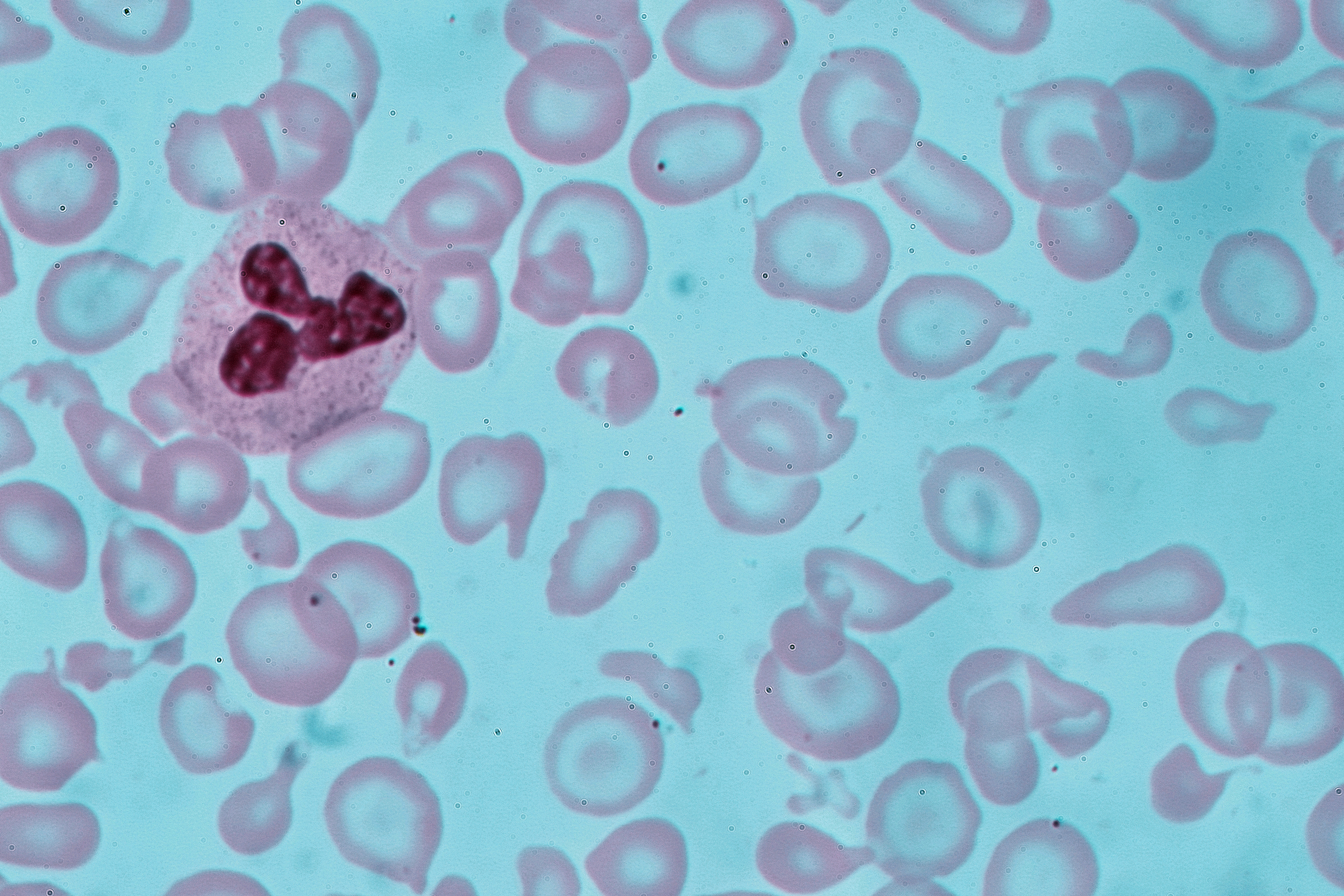
A Giemsa-stained blood film from a person with iron-deficiency anemia. This person also had hemoglobin Kenya.

=== Definitions ===
There are several definitions of anemia. A strict but broad definition is an absolute decrease in red blood cell mass, however, a broader definition is a lowered ability of the blood to carry oxygen. An operational definition is a decrease in whole-blood hemoglobin concentration of more than 2 standard deviations below the mean of an age- and sex-matched reference range.

World Health Organization Hemoglobin thresholds used to define anemia
Age or gender group	Hb threshold (g/L)
Children (0.5–2 yrs)	105
Children (2–5 yrs)	110
Children (5–12 yrs)	115
Teens (12–15 yrs)	120
Non-pregnant women (>15yrs)	120
Pregnant girls and women	105–110
Men (>15yrs)	130

==== Etymology ====
The name is derived from Ancient Greek ἀν- (an-) 'not' and "αἷμᾰ" (haîmă) 'blood'. A related word, ischemia, derives from the Greek from ῐ̓́σχω (ĭ́skhō, "stop") and αἷμᾰ (haîmă, "blood"); the roots of the both words refer to the basic idea of "lack of blood", but the meaning is significantly different. Anemia implies widespread effects from blood that either is too scarce (e.g., blood loss) or is dysfunctional in its oxygen-supplying ability (due to whatever type of hemoglobin or erythrocyte problem). Ischemia is a restriction in blood supply to any tissue, muscle, or organ of the body, causing a shortage of oxygen that is needed to keep tissues alive, as may occur for example in a stroke.

=== Testing ===
Anemia is typically diagnosed on a complete blood count from a blood sample. An automated hematology analyzer measures the hemoglobin level, hematocrit (% volume of RBCs in the blood), the size of the RBCs, and counts of white blood cells and platelets.

Further tests will be needed to determine the underlying cause; these may include (not a complete list):

- A count of reticulocytes (immature RBCs), which measures the capacity of the bone marrow to produce new RBCs.
- Iron profile, to establish if there is underlying iron deficiency (the most common cause of anemia).
- Family history and genetic testing, to establish if there is an inherited disorder (the second most common cause).
- Peripheral blood smear - a small blood sample is examined under a microscope to check the size and shape of RBCs. Among other things, this should detect malaria parasites, which are globally the third most common cause.
- Serum creatinine, to check if poor kidney function underlies the anemia.

== Causes ==
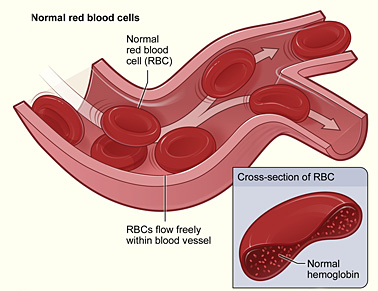
Figure shows normal red blood cells flowing freely in a blood vessel. The inset image shows a cross-section of a normal red blood cell with normal hemoglobin.

In humans, mature red blood cells (RBCs) are flexible biconcave disks, lacking cell nucleus and organelles. The process by which new RBCs are produced is termed erythropoiesis; committed stem cells in the red bone marrow of large bones take 7 days to mature into red blood cells. Between 2 and 3 million new RBCs are produced per second in human adults. The functional lifetime of a RBC is about 100–120 days, during which time the cells are continually moving within the blood circulation. The aging RBC undergoes changes in its plasma membrane, making it susceptible to recognition by macrophages and subsequent breakdown in the spleen, thus removing old and defective cells and continually purging the blood. This process is termed eryptosis; much of the resulting breakdown products are recirculated in the body. RBC breakdown by eryptosis normally occurs at the same rate as production by erythropoiesis, thus maintaining a balanced RBC population in the circulation.

The causes of anemia may be classified as impaired red blood cell (RBC) production, increased RBC destruction (hemolytic anemia), blood loss, and fluid overload (hypervolemia). Globally, the most common underlying cause of anemia is dietary iron deficiency, followed by the inherited conditions thalassaemia and sickle cell trait, and infectious disease (principally malaria).

=== Impaired production ===
- Disturbance of proliferation and differentiation of stem cells
  - Pure red cell aplasia
  - Aplastic anemia affects all kinds of blood cells. Fanconi anemia is a hereditary disorder or defect featuring aplastic anemia and various other abnormalities, including malformation of the extremities.
  - Anemia of kidney failure due to insufficient production of the hormone erythropoietin
  - Anemia of endocrine disease
- Disturbance of proliferation and maturation of erythroblasts
  - Pernicious anemia is a form of megaloblastic anemia due to vitamin B_{12} deficiency.
  - Anemia of folate deficiency, as with vitamin B_{12}, causes megaloblastic anemia.
  - Anemia of prematurity, by diminished erythropoietin response to declining hematocrit levels, combined with blood loss from laboratory testing, generally occurs in premature infants at two to six weeks of age.
  - Iron-deficiency anemia, resulting in deficient heme synthesis. Globally, this is the most common type of anemia; it may be caused by poor diet (common in poor communities), blood loss, or poor absorption of iron from food. Sources of blood loss can include heavy periods, childbirth, uterine fibroids, stomach ulcers, colon cancer, and urinary tract bleeding. Poor absorption of iron from food may occur as a result of an intestinal disorder such as inflammatory bowel disease or celiac disease, or surgery such as a gastric bypass. In low income communities with poor diet, parasitic worms, malaria, and HIV/AIDS increase the risk of iron deficiency anemia.
  - Thalassemias, causing deficient globin synthesis
  - Congenital dyserythropoietic anemias, causing ineffective erythropoiesis.
  - Anemia of kidney failure.
- Other mechanisms of impaired RBC production
  - Myelophthisic anemia or myelophthisis is a severe type of anemia resulting from the replacement of bone marrow by other materials, such as malignant tumors, fibrosis, or granulomas. The term Leukoerythroblastic is applied to a typical blood smear showing immature and abnormal erythrocytes.
  - Myelodysplastic syndrome
- Anemia of chronic disease.
  - Chronic inflammation can disrupt iron handling, limiting its availability for red blood cell formation. In chronic inflammation, the liver produces high levels of hepcidin, a hormone which regulates iron metabolism. This leads to high ferritin levels and low transferrin saturation, a pattern known as "functional iron deficiency." In this condition, iron availability is restricted even when total body iron stores are adequate, contributing to anemia common in inflammatory bowel diseases and chronic infections. This mechanism is commonly seen in older hospitalized patients with long-standing illnesses such as infections, heart failure or autoimmune conditions.
  - Intestinal inflammation, which may be caused by: Helicobacter pylori infection., gluten-related disorders such as untreated celiac disease and non-celiac gluten sensitivity; or Inflammatory bowel disease.

=== Increased destruction ===
Anemias of increased red blood cell destruction are generally classified as hemolytic anemias. These types generally feature jaundice, and elevated levels of lactate dehydrogenase.

- Intrinsic (intracorpuscular) abnormalities cause premature destruction. All of these, except paroxysmal nocturnal hemoglobinuria, are hereditary genetic disorders.
  - Hereditary spherocytosis is a hereditary defect that results in defects in the RBC cell membrane, causing the erythrocytes to be sequestered and destroyed by the spleen.
  - Hereditary elliptocytosis is another defect in membrane skeleton proteins.
  - Abetalipoproteinemia, causing defects in membrane lipids.
  - Enzyme deficiencies
    - Pyruvate kinase and hexokinase deficiencies, causing defect glycolysis.
    - Glucose-6-phosphate dehydrogenase deficiency (G6PDD) and glutathione synthetase deficiency, causing increased oxidative stress.
  - Hemoglobinopathies
    - Sickle cell anemia
    - Hemoglobinopathies causing unstable hemoglobins
  - Paroxysmal nocturnal hemoglobinuria
- Extrinsic (extracorpuscular) abnormalities
  - Antibody-mediated
    - Warm autoimmune hemolytic anemia is caused by an autoimmune attack against red blood cells, primarily by IgG. It is the most common of the autoimmune hemolytic diseases. It can be idiopathic, that is, without any known cause, drug-associated or secondary to another disease such as systemic lupus erythematosus, or a malignancy, such as chronic lymphocytic leukemia.
    - Cold agglutinin hemolytic anemia is primarily mediated by IgM. It can be idiopathic or result from an underlying condition.
    - Rh disease, one of the causes of hemolytic disease of the newborn
    - Transfusion reaction to blood transfusions
  - Mechanical trauma to red blood cells
    - Microangiopathic hemolytic anemias, including thrombotic thrombocytopenic purpura and disseminated intravascular coagulation
    - Mechanical heart valves and blood pumps.
  - Parasitic
    - Trypanosoma congolense causes the disease nagana in cattle and other domesticated animals.
    - Infection with the malaria parasite is a common cause of anemia across many tropical and subtropical regions.
  - Breakdown of hemoglobin
    - Heinz body anemia, which may be caused by G6PD deficiency, or through oxidative damage by administered drugs.

=== Blood loss ===
- Trauma
- Gastrointestinal blood loss:
  - Lesions, leading to either acute bleeds (e.g. variceal lesions, peptic ulcers, hemorrhoids) or chronic blood loss (e.g. angiodysplasia).
  - Chronic bleeding due to infection by intestinal nematodes feeding on blood, such as hookworms and the whipworm Trichuris trichiura
- Gynecologic disturbances:
  - From abnormally heavy menstruation
  - Repeated pregnancies and short birth intervals.
- Many types of cancers, such as leukemia and multiple myeloma, may cause acute or chronic blood loss.
- Anemia caused by medical interventions (Iatrogenic anemia): acute blood loss from repeated blood draws, surgical procedures, or as a side effect of chemotherapy.

=== Fluid overload ===
Fluid overload (hypervolemia) causes decreased hemoglobin concentration and apparent anemia:

- General causes of hypervolemia include excessive sodium or fluid intake, sodium or water retention.
- During early pregnancy, hormonal changes trigger an increase in blood plasma volume, while red cell mass increases more slowly. This physiological change dilutes existing RBCs and may trigger a diagnosis of anemia.

=== General global contributors ===
- In many regions, nutritional deficiencies are major drivers of reduced RBC production. Poor intake of iron, folate, and vitamin B_{12} can significantly impair hemoglobin synthesis and erythropoiesis. This is especially common in low-income populations, areas with limited food diversity, and communities experiencing famine. Socioeconomic factors such as poverty, limited access to nutrient-rich foods, and high rates of parasitic exposure increase the risk of iron-deficiency anemia in women and children.
- Pregnancy greatly increases iron requirements, and inadequate dietary intake during pregnancy is one of the leading causes of anemia among reproductive-age women worldwide.
- Chronic infections common in developing countries, such as malaria and hookworm disease, impair erythropoiesis either through inflammatory suppression or recurrent blood loss leading to iron depletion.

== Classification systems ==
Anemia is often classified by the size of red blood cells, visible in a peripheral blood smear. The mean corpuscular volume (MCV) of a normal RBC is between 80 and 100 femtoliters. If the cells are smaller than 80 fl, the anemia is said to be microcytic; if they are larger than 100 fl, the anemia is macrocytic. Within the normal range, the anemia is normocytic.

The most common causes of microcytic anemia are iron deficiency, thalassemia, and chronic diseases such as autoimmunity or cancer. Macrocytic anemia can be caused by e.g. vitamin deficiency (B_{12} or folate), alcohol use disorder, or hypothyroidism. Normocytic anemias include those caused by blood loss, some chronic diseases, or kidney disease.

The other principal method of classification looks at the balance between erythropoiesis (RBC production in the bone marrow) and eryptosis (RBC breakdown, principally in the spleen). Anemias in which the bone marrow fails to make sufficient RBCs are termed hypoproliferative; included in this group are nutrient deficiencies (e.g. iron, B_{12}, folate), thalassemia, and cancers which affect the bone marrow. When production is normal but there is excessively rapid breakdown of RBCs, the term is hemolytic anemia. This group includes sickle cell anemia, malaria, glucose-6-phosphate dehydrogenase deficiency and some autoimmune conditions such as lupus. Acute anemia caused by blood loss - e.g. following injury, surgery or childbirth - doesn't fit into this classification.

=== Transfusion dependence ===
Anemia is classified as transfusion-dependent if regular blood transfusions are required to maintain quality of life, or to prevent death. Most people with myelodysplastic syndrome develop this state at some point in time. Beta thalassemia may also result in transfusion dependence. Concerns from repeated blood transfusions include iron overload, which may require chelation therapy.

== Treatment ==
=== Cause ===
Treatment of anemia depends entirely on establishing the underlying cause.

==== Acute anemia ====
Acute anemia is typically caused by sudden loss of blood, e.g. through injury, hemorrhage, or breakdown of red blood cells as in malaria or some conditions causing acute hemolysis. This can be relieved with supplemental oxygen or blood transfusion. Provided the root cause can be fixed, these treatments can be discontinued as recovery takes place and the body naturally replaces the lost blood cells.

==== Deficiency anemias ====
The most common cause of anemia is iron deficiency, and the most common cause of this is poor diet, especially in low income communities. Other common deficiencies causing anemia are vitamin B_{12} and folate. Treatment for these involves supplements - iron or B_{12} (either as tablet or injection) or folate (as tablet). Changes to diet will be recommended if poor diet is causing or contributing to the anemia. Other contributing factors - e.g. intestinal disease affecting the absorption of nutrients, or hookworm infection - must also be treated. For women with severe menstrual bleeding which leads to iron deficiency, hormone treatment may be effective.

==== Hereditary anemias ====
The most common hereditary causes of anemia are sickle-cell disease (causing increased hemolysis) and thalassemia (reduced production of hemoglobin). Less common are hereditary spherocytosis and G6PD Deficiency. Generally speaking, mild cases can cause few symptoms and either need no treatment or can be managed by means of avoiding circumstances which might trigger a crisis, monitoring and occasional treatment. More severe cases may need be treated by blood transfusion or surgical removal of the spleen. Sickle-cell disease and thalassemia may also be treated by means of stem cell transplantation.

==== Iatrogenic anemias ====
Iatrogenic anemias are caused by medical interventions. Most common is repeated blood draws, e.g. while in hospital critical care. This can be mitigated by minimising the frequency or volume of blood taken, and by blood transfusion. Some forms of chemotherapy can cause anemia; if the regimen cannot be changed, transfusions are necessary.

=== Principal methods of treatment ===
==== Iron supplementation ====
Iron deficiency results in the decreased production of hemoglobin, the oxygen-carrying protein in red blood cells. Mild to moderate iron-deficiency anemia is treated by iron supplementation in the diet. In cases where this is either ineffective, would be too slow (for example, pre-operatively), or where absorption is impeded (for example, in cases of inflammation), iron supplementation can be given intravenously.

==== Blood transfusions ====
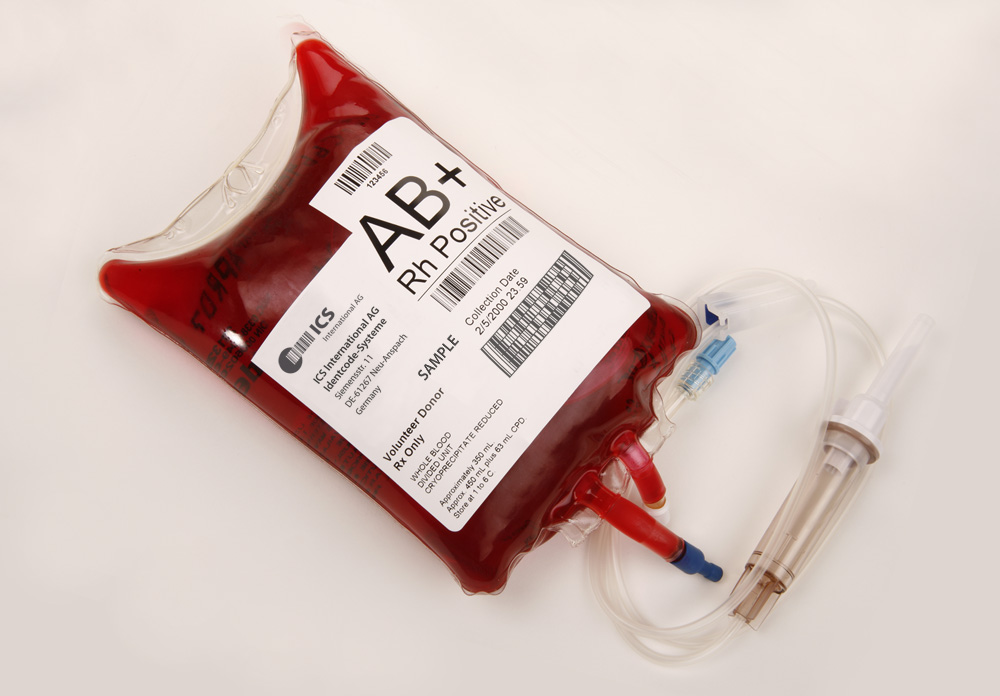
Blood bag used for blood transfusion

Blood transfusion is the process of transferring blood products into a person's circulation intravenously. Transfusion is generally recommended if hemoglobin falls below 70 to 80 grams/liter. Prior to transfusion, the donated blood is carefully crossmatched with the patient's blood to ensure compatibility. During transfusion, the patient is monitored for any side effects.

==== Bone marrow transplant ====
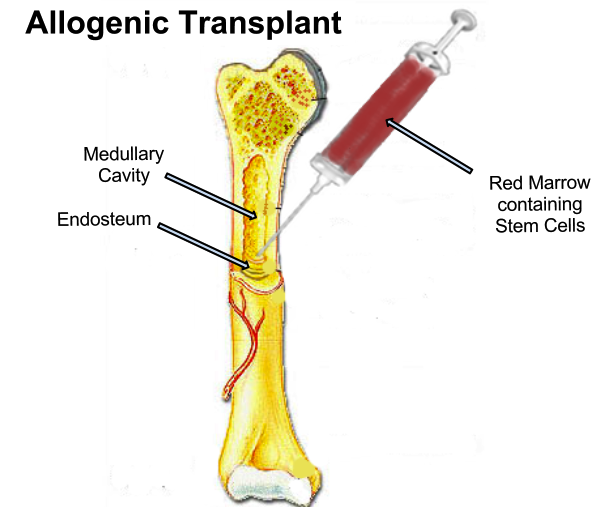
Procedure of harvesting blood stem cells for transplantation

Red blood cells are manufactured in the bone marrow. A bone marrow transplant may be recommended if the marrow is unable to produce enough red blood cells, as for example in aplastic anemia. In a bone marrow transplant, old defective bone marrow is destroyed using drugs and replaced with new stem cells from a compatible donor.

==== Vitamin B_{12} ====
In severe cases where vitamin B_{12} diet is not being absorbed in the intestine, it can instead be supplemented via intramuscular injection. Pernicious anemia, for example, is a type of vitamin B_{12} deficiency anemia that results from lack of intrinsic factor. Vitamin B_{12} injections, initially given daily, are quick-acting, and symptoms usually go away within one to two weeks. As the condition improves, doses are reduced in frequency. In some cases lifelong treatment may be needed.

==== Erythropoiesis-stimulating agents ====
Erythropoiesis-stimulating agents (ESA) work to increase production of erythropoietin, a hormone that increases the production of red blood cells. They are used to treat anemia due to end stage kidney disease, chemotherapy, major surgery, or certain treatments in HIV/AIDS. In these situations they decrease the need for blood transfusions.

== Epidemiology ==
Anemia affects 24% of the world's population, with iron-deficiency anemia accounting for the majority of cases.

=== Geographical trends ===
Globally, anemia is most common in the tropical areas of sub-Saharan Africa and South Asia. As of 2021, anemia affected 47.4% of the population in Western sub-Saharan Africa and 35.7% in South Asia. This is due to a combination of poor diet (contributing to iron deficiency), parasitic diseases, and hemoglobinopathies such as sickle cell disease. Women of reproductive age are more at risk due to blood loss during menstruation or childbirth.

=== Population groups at higher risk ===
Generally speaking, the very young and the very old have a higher risk of anemia than the general population. In the first few months after birth, babies have a natural dip in hemoglobin levels (physiologic anemia) as their body adjusts to life outside the womb; this can be aggravated by other factors such as premature birth, blood loss, and consumption of cow's milk. As children grow, they have a proportionately higher need for iron in their diet compared with adults, and are at risk of anemia if they have a poor diet.

Women of reproductive age have enhanced risk of anemia. This could be associated with loss of blood during menstruation, or with pregnancy. In normal pregnancies, a natural increase in plasma volume is not matched by an increase in RBC mass leading to a mild decrease in hemoglobin concentration referred to as physiologic (or dilutional) anemia. There is also a risk of blood loss during childbirth.

The major inherited anemias, thalassemia and sickle cell, are prevalent in areas which are historically prone to malaria - Africa, the Mediterranean, the Middle East, and South Asia. They are now more widely distributed geographically among populations who originated in the areas; this is a consequence of the slave trade in the 18th and 19th centuries, and other causes of migration more recently.

=== Socioeconomic status ===
Deficiency anemias (iron, B_{12} or folate deficiency) are strongly linked with low socioeconomic status. This is attributed to a combination of poor diet and poor health literacy. This translates geographically into a high incidence of these anemias in low and middle-income countries. Low income groups in developed countries also show an increased incidence of anemia.

== History ==
Signs of severe anemia in human bones from 4000 years ago have been uncovered in Thailand.

The first discovery and discussion of blood was in 1674 when Antoni van Leeuwenhoek described red blood cells (RBCs) as "small round globules." RBCs counterpart, hemoglobin, wasn't discovered until much later by FL Hünefeld in 1840. In 1746, Vincenzo Menghini showed that iron was concentrated in the red blood cells using a magnetic knife. Between 1877 and 1885, many key tools emerged like hemocytometer (RBC count), hemoglobin measurement, and hematocrit measurement that allowed for quantitative diagnosis of blood. By the 1920s it was confirmed by multiple different studies that iron existed in plasma. McCance and Widdowson showed that iron is not excreted from the body in 1938, and it was later confirmed that iron absorption is the main way the body regulates iron levels.

Ancient cultures like Assyria and Mediterranean societies used iron for medical treatments, however this occurred before iron's biological role was understood. In the 1500s, Nicholas Monarde used iron's "healing powers" to treat gout, acne and hair loss. Anemia was recognized as a clinical entity in 1807. Early diagnosis of anemia in the early 1800s were based solely on physical examinations such as fatigue, paleness, sweating, difficulty breathing, and dizziness. It wasn't until the late 1800s that new technologies allowed for a more in depth, lab-based diagnosis of anemia. In 1939, anemia was officially defined as "a deficiency of blood not due to hemorrhage".
