= Iatrogenic anemia =

Anemia caused by medical interventions

- Other names: Nosocomial anemia, hospital-acquired anemia
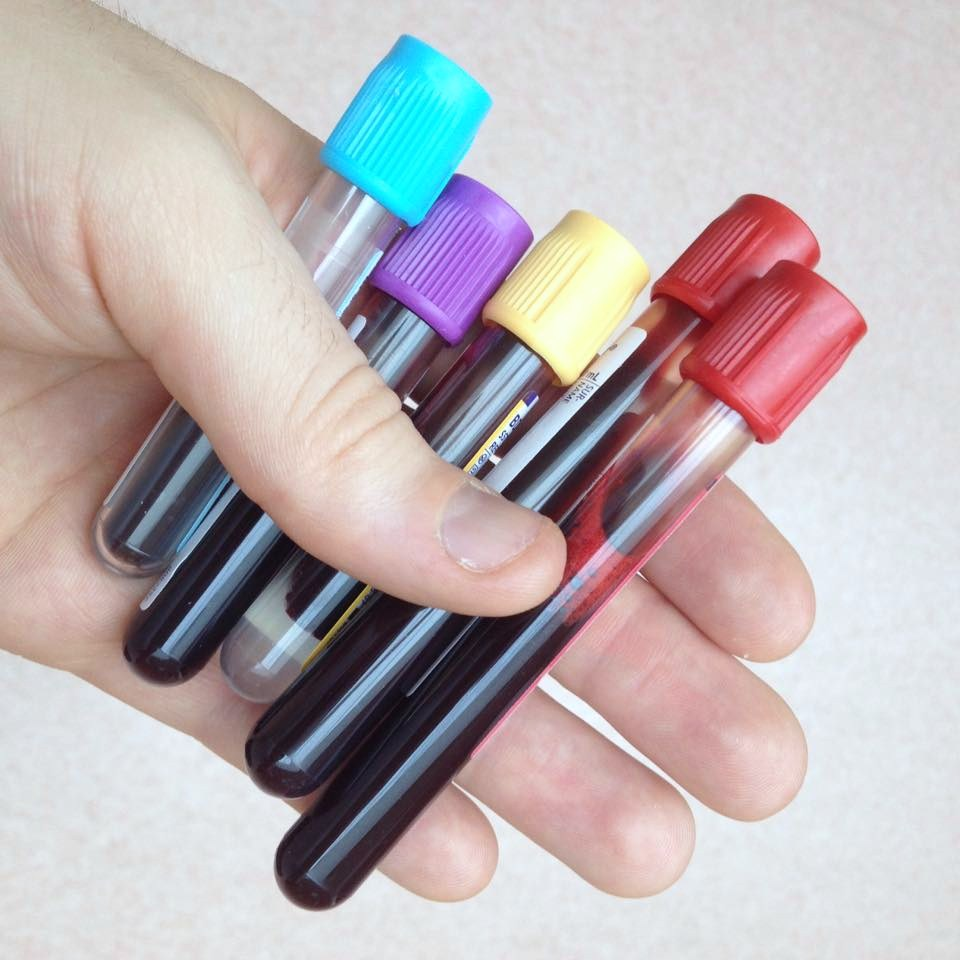
- Excessive blood draws are a major cause of iatrogenic anemia.
- Causes: Repeated blood draws; surgical and medical procedures; intravenous fluid administration
- Prevention: Drawing smaller volumes of blood; using blood conservation devices; limiting laboratory test ordering

Iatrogenic anemia, also known as nosocomial anemia or hospital-acquired anemia, is a condition in which a person develops anemia due to medical interventions, most frequently repeated blood draws. Other factors that contribute to iatrogenic anemia include bleeding from medical procedures and dilution of the blood by intravenous fluids. People may receive blood transfusions to treat iatrogenic anemia, which carries risks for complications like transfusion reactions and circulatory overload.

== Incidence and cause ==
A 2013 study of over 400,000 people admitted to US hospitals found that 74% developed anemia at some point during their hospital stay. Iatrogenic anemia is of particular concern in intensive care medicine, because people who are critically ill require frequent blood tests and have a higher risk of developing anemia due to lower hemoglobin levels and impaired production of red blood cells (erythropoesis) at baseline. The average intensive care unit (ICU) patient loses up to 660 mL of blood per week to laboratory testing. For each day in the ICU, it is estimated that a person's hemoglobin level falls by 5 g/L (0.5 g/dL), 80% of which is due to phlebotomy. On the second day of admission to the ICU, more than 70% of adults exhibit anemia, over half of whom will go on to require a blood transfusion.

In the neonatal intensive care unit (NICU), the issue is exacerbated by the patients' low body weight: it is estimated that during their first six weeks of life, infants in NICUs may lose 15−30% of their blood volume to blood draws. Premature babies often suffer from anemia of prematurity, which is caused by low production of erythropoietin (a hormone that stimulates red blood cell production) and the short lifespan of neonates' red blood cells, and is worsened by blood loss through phlebotomy.

People who are receiving dialysis lose blood not only through sampling for laboratory tests, but from the dialysis process itself and from bleeding caused by accessing veins to attach the dialysis equipment. This iatrogenic anemia often occurs alongside the anemia caused by kidney disease.

Another factor that contributes to anemia in hospitalized people is the use of intravenous fluids. Infusion with large volumes of intravenous fluids dilutes the blood, causing a decreased hemoglobin and hematocrit level. This is not a true anemia, as no red blood cells are lost and the body eventually compensates for the effects of the infusion. However, the decreased hemoglobin and hematocrit may lead to unnecessary transfusion. Blood loss through surgery and through medical procedures such as central line placement also play a role, as does the use of certain drugs which can suppress the bone marrow's ability to produce red blood cells.

== Complications ==
People who develop iatrogenic anemia spend a longer amount of time in the hospital and have an increased risk of mortality. They are also more likely to receive blood transfusions, which carries risks for various conditions, including transfusion reactions, lung injury, circulatory overload and alloimmunization. After the initial development of anemia, further testing may be ordered to monitor and investigate the condition, which worsens the anemia and the attendant risks for complications.

== Prevention ==
The volume of blood needed for most laboratory tests is lower than the amount that is commonly drawn; a 2008 study found that only 9% of the blood in standard sized blood tubes was used for testing. Using smaller tubes for blood tests can decrease the risk of anemia, but it may increase the risk of laboratory errors. Point-of-care testing, meaning testing performed at a patient's bedside rather than in a medical laboratory, typically uses much smaller blood volumes than conventional testing; however, as of 2019, there is insufficient evidence regarding the effects of point-of-care testing on iatrogenic anemia. The use of closed blood sampling devices, which return excess blood from blood draws or line flushes to the person's circulation, can decrease the amount of blood loss in hospitalized patients. Strategies to decrease the amount of blood tests ordered, such as clinician education and auditing, or restricting test orders through the electronic health record, have also been investigated.
