= Giovanni Giacinto Vogli =

Italian physician and writer (1697–1762)

Giovanni Giacinto Vogli (1697–1762) was an Italian physician and writer.

== Biography ==
He was born in Budrio, but moved to Bologna; where he initially studied with the Jesuits. He then studied medicine at the University of Bologna. He wrote a book (published 1726) about distinguished graduates of this university. He was best known for a medical dissertation titled: De Anthropogenia dissertatio anatomico physica (1718, Bologna).

At the University of Bologna, he studied initially under Stefano Danielli (1656–1730), professor of Anatomy and Medicine. He was able to obtain a doctorate in philosophy and medicine in 1714, at the age of 17 years. He then moved to Florence to work at the Hospital of Santa Maria Novella. During this time, the debates were still raging between the followers of Marcello Malpighi and of Giovanni Girolamo Sbaraglia. This contentious debate had both scientific/philosophic differences as well as tinged by familial grudges. Malpighi was also defending the use of animal studies and new-fangled techniques like microanatomy to contribute to the human medicine, while Sbaraglia thought past knowledge and empirical studies were more important. Vogli seems to have defended the Sbaraglia arguments in his De Anthropogonia Dissertatio Anatomico-Phisica, in qua de Viviparorum Genesi. Volgi also practiced for a time in the Duchy of Urbino.

In the first half of the 1720s Vogli returns to the university to study algebra with professor Carlo Hebert Gerolimino. In 1725, he became a lecturer in anatomy. In 1728, he was named professor of anatomy, with the support of also Sbaraglia. His work on Fluidi Nervei Historia (1720) where he applied comparative physiology of different species. This book was said to be influential for Luigi Galvani. In the 1730s, Vogli was accepted as a member of the Accademia delle Scienze of Bologna. In the 1740s he was appointed to the newly founded Accademia Benedettina, a papal science academy, and an appointment that carried a yearly stipend. He dedicated some of the time to studying fossil records.

Vogli would marry the sister of Vincenzo Menghini, who was one of the first to report the presence of iron in the blood. Of his sons, Giuseppe became a natural scientist and member of the Academy of Sciences. By 1740s, he suffered loss of vision and was blind for his last decade of life.
