= Erythrocrine =

Type of red blood cell

Erythrocrine describes red blood cell or erythrocyte for production and release of signaling molecules. The term "erythrocrine" was coined by Song et al.^{[1,2]} in reference to erythrocyte, particularly the mature erythrocyte as a secretory cell, not just engaging in gaseous conveyance and exchange.

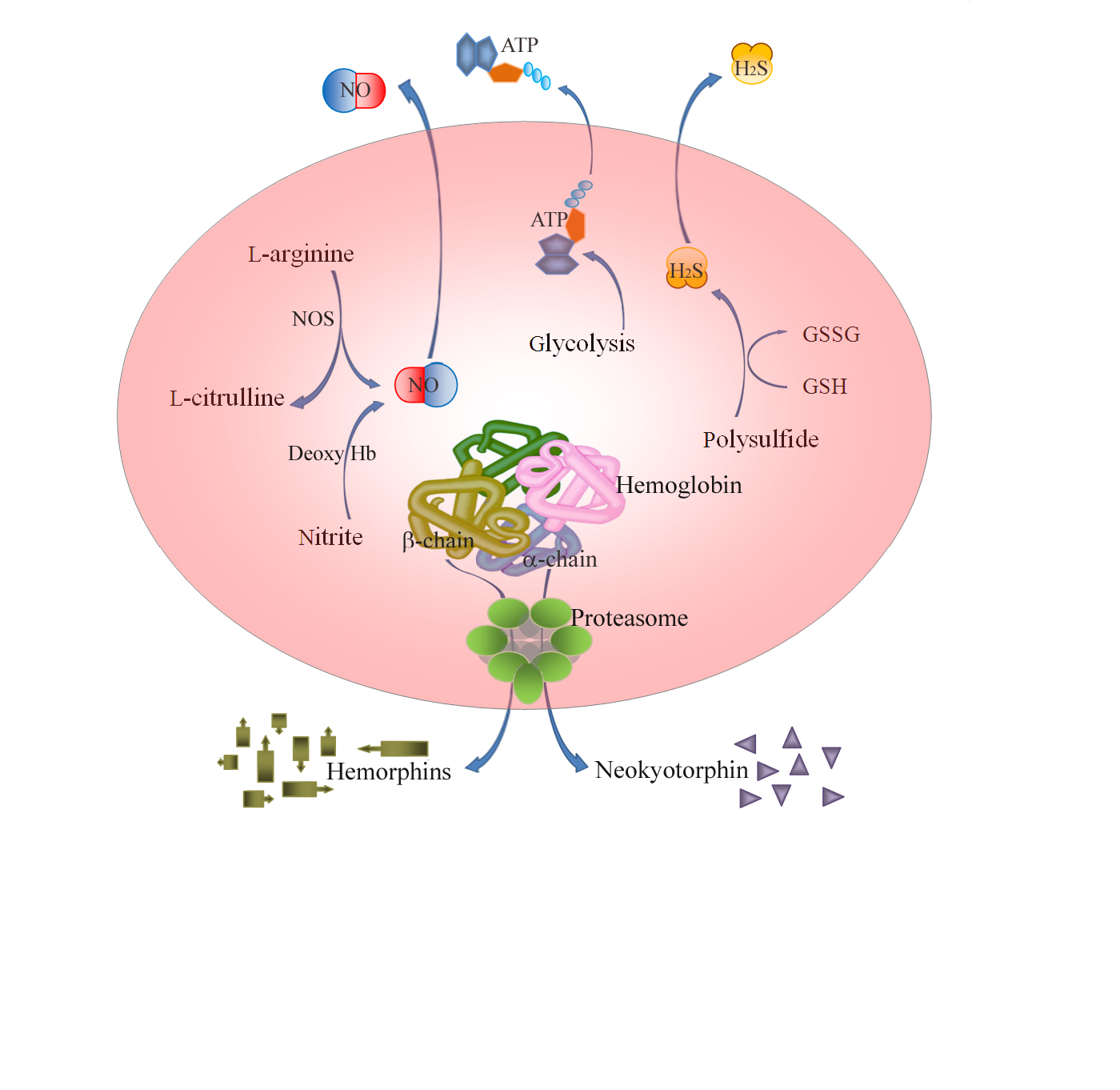
Erythrocrine enables erythrocyte to emerge as a signaling cell.

The erythrocyte is differentiated for such function to predominantly express hemoglobin and remove all the organelle including protein synthesis machinery. Our traditional review of erythrocyte function is solely for gaseous exchange. Nevertheless, several previously undetected physiologic functions of erythrocyte are largely neglected.
