= Red blood cell =

Oxygen-delivering blood cell and the most common type of blood cell

Red blood cells
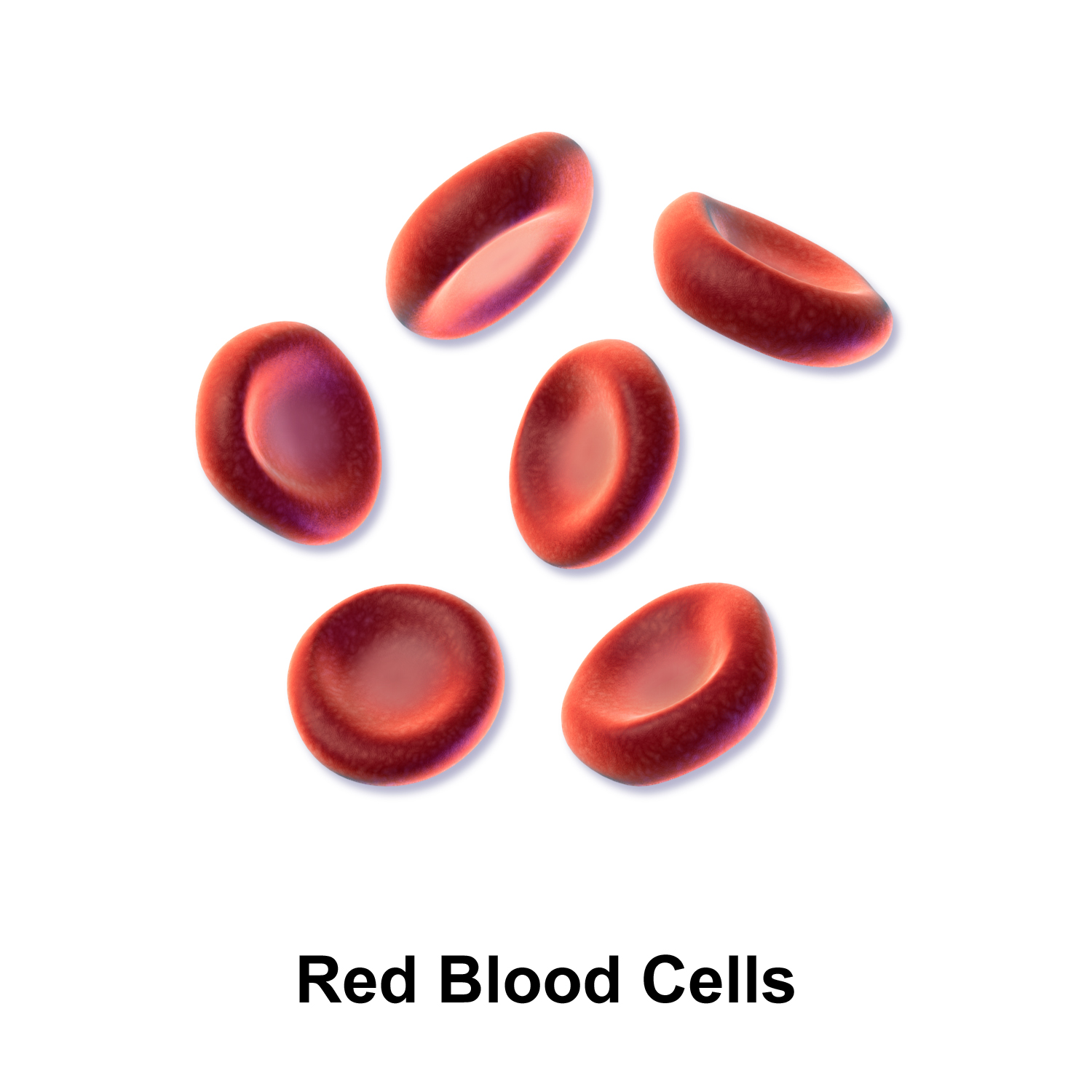
- 3D rendering of human red blood cells (c. 6–8 μm in diameter)

Details
- Function: Oxygen transport

Identifiers
- Acronym: RBC
- MeSH: D004912
- TH: H2.00.04.1.01001
- FMA: 62845

Red blood cells (RBCs), referred to as erythrocytes (from Ancient Greek erythros 'red' and kytos 'hollow vessel', with -cyte translated as 'cell' in modern usage) in academia and medical publishing, also known as red cells, erythroid cells, and rarely haematids, are the most common type of blood cell and the vertebrate's principal means of delivering oxygen (O_{2}) to the body tissues—via blood flow through the circulatory system. Erythrocytes take up oxygen in the lungs, or in fish the gills, and release it into tissues while squeezing through the body's capillaries.

The cytoplasm of a red blood cell is rich in hemoglobin (Hb), an iron-containing biomolecule that can bind oxygen. It is responsible for the red color of the cells and the blood. Each human red blood cell contains approximately 270 million hemoglobin molecules. The cell membrane is composed of proteins and lipids, and this structure provides properties essential for physiological cell function such as deformability and stability of the blood cell while traversing the circulatory system and specifically the capillary network.

In humans, mature red blood cells are flexible biconcave disks. They lack a cell nucleus (which is expelled during development) and organelles, to accommodate maximum space for hemoglobin; they can be viewed as sacks of hemoglobin, with a plasma membrane as the sack. Approximately 2.4 million new erythrocytes are produced per second in human adults. The cells develop in the bone marrow and circulate for about 100–120 days in the body before their components are recycled by macrophages. The average circulation time is about 60 seconds (one minute). Approximately 84% of the cells in the human body are the 20–30 trillion red blood cells. Nearly half of the blood's volume (40% to 45%) is red blood cells.

Packed red blood cells are red blood cells that have been donated, processed, and stored in a blood bank for blood transfusion.

== Structure ==
=== Vertebrates ===
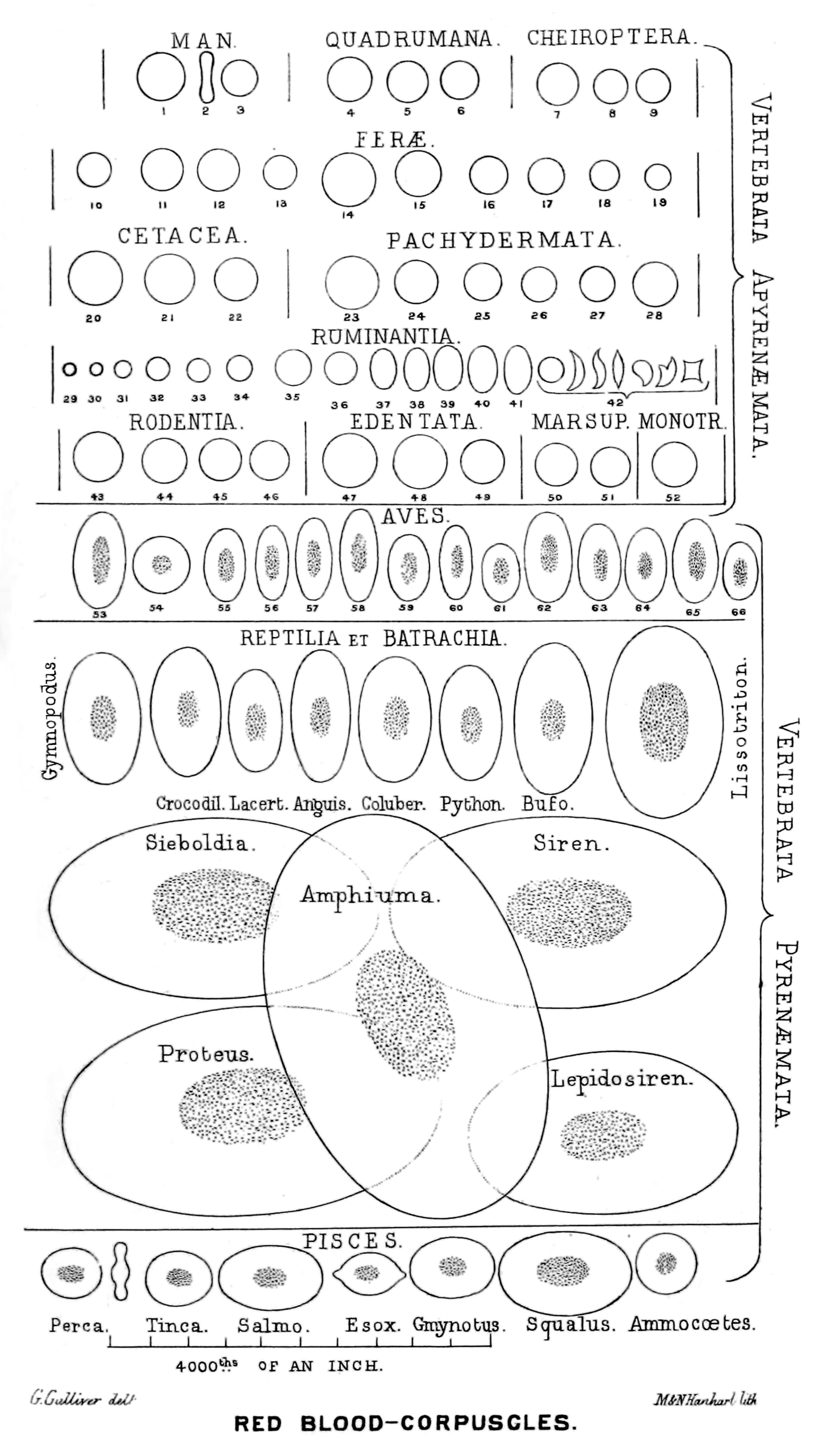
There is an immense size variation in vertebrate red blood cells, as well as a correlation between cell and nucleus size. Mammalian red blood cells, which do not contain nuclei, are considerably smaller than those of most other vertebrates.

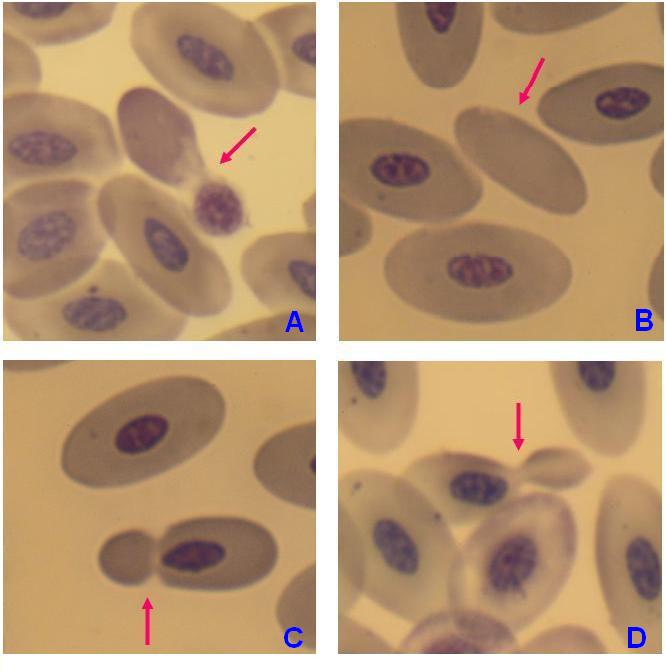
Mature red blood cells of birds have a nucleus, however in the blood of adult females of penguin Pygoscelis papua enucleated red blood cells (B) have been observed, but with very low frequency.

The vast majority of vertebrates, including mammals and humans, have red blood cells. These erythrocytes are cells present in blood to transport oxygen. The only known vertebrates without red blood cells are the crocodile icefish (family Channichthyidae); they live in very oxygen-rich cold water and transport oxygen freely dissolved in their blood. While they no longer use hemoglobin, remnants of hemoglobin genes can be found in their genome.

Vertebrate red blood cells consist mainly of hemoglobin, a complex metalloprotein containing heme groups whose iron atoms temporarily bind to oxygen molecules (O_{2}) in the lungs or gills and release them throughout the body. Oxygen can easily diffuse through the erythrocyte's cell membrane. Hemoglobin in the red blood cells also carries some of the waste product carbon dioxide back from the tissues; most waste carbon dioxide, however, is transported back to the pulmonary capillaries of the lungs as bicarbonate (HCO_{3}^{−}) dissolved in the blood plasma. Myoglobin, a compound related to hemoglobin, acts to store oxygen in muscle cells.

The color of red blood cells is due to the heme group of hemoglobin. The blood plasma alone is straw-colored, but the red blood cells change color depending on the state of the hemoglobin: when combined with oxygen the resulting oxyhemoglobin is scarlet, and when oxygen has been released the resulting deoxyhemoglobin is of a dark red burgundy color. However, blood can appear bluish when seen through the vessel wall and skin. Pulse oximetry takes advantage of the hemoglobin color change to directly measure the arterial blood oxygen saturation using colorimetric techniques. Hemoglobin also has a very high affinity for carbon monoxide, forming carboxyhemoglobin which is a very bright red in color. Flushed, confused patients with a saturation reading of 100% on pulse oximetry are sometimes found to be suffering from carbon monoxide poisoning.

Having oxygen-carrying proteins inside specialized cells (as opposed to oxygen carriers being dissolved in body fluid) was an important step in the evolution of vertebrates as it allows for less viscous blood, higher concentrations of oxygen, and better diffusion of oxygen from the blood to the tissues. The size of red blood cells varies widely among vertebrate species; red blood cell width is on average about 25% larger than capillary diameter, and it has been hypothesized that this improves the oxygen transfer from red blood cells to tissues.

=== Mammals ===
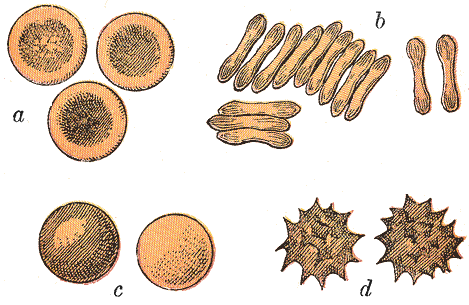
Typical mammalian red blood cells: (a) seen from surface; (b) in profile, forming rouleaux; (c) rendered spherical by water; (d) rendered crenate (shrunken and spiky) by salt. (c) and (d) do not normally occur in the body. The last two shapes are due to water being transported into, and out of, the cells, by osmosis.

The red blood cells of mammals are typically shaped as biconcave disks: flattened and depressed in the center, with a dumbbell-shaped cross section, and a torus-shaped rim on the edge of the disk. This shape allows for a high surface-area-to-volume (SA/V) ratio to facilitate diffusion of gases. However, there are some exceptions concerning shape in the artiodactyl order (even-toed ungulates including cattle, deer, and their relatives), which displays a wide variety of bizarre red blood cell morphologies: small and highly ovaloid cells in llamas and camels (family Camelidae), tiny spherical cells in mouse deer (family Tragulidae), and cells which assume fusiform, lanceolate, crescentic, and irregularly polygonal and other angular forms in red deer and wapiti (family Cervidae). Members of this order have clearly evolved a mode of red blood cell development substantially different from the mammalian norm. Overall, mammalian red blood cells are remarkably flexible and deformable so as to squeeze through tiny capillaries, as well as to maximize their apposing surface by assuming a cigar shape, where they efficiently release their oxygen load.

Red blood cells in mammals are unique amongst vertebrates as most species do not have nuclei when mature. They do have nuclei during early phases of erythropoiesis, but extrude them during development as they mature; this provides more space for hemoglobin. The red blood cells without nuclei, called reticulocytes, subsequently lose all other cellular organelles such as their mitochondria, Golgi apparatus and endoplasmic reticulum.

The spleen acts as a reservoir of red blood cells, but this effect is somewhat limited in humans. In some other mammals such as dogs and horses, the spleen sequesters large numbers of red blood cells, which are dumped into the blood during times of exertion stress, yielding a higher oxygen transport capacity.

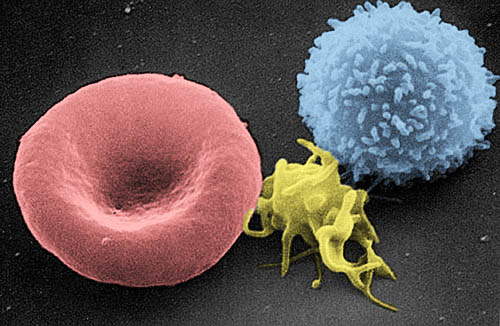
Scanning electron micrograph of blood cells. From left to right: human red blood cell, thrombocyte (platelet), leukocyte.

=== Human ===
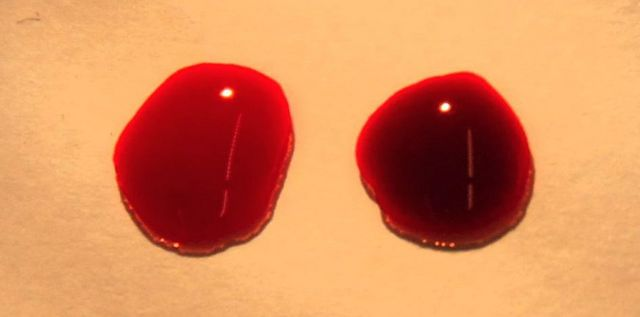
Two drops of blood are shown with a bright red oxygenated drop on the left and a darker red deoxygenated drop on the right.

Animation of a typical human red blood cell cycle in the circulatory system. This animation occurs at a faster rate (~20 seconds of the average 60-second cycle) and shows the red blood cell deforming as it enters capillaries, as well as the bars changing color as the cell alternates in states of oxygenation along the circulatory system.

A typical human red blood cell has a disk diameter of approximately 6.2–8.2 μm and a maximum thickness of 2–2.5 μm and a minimum thickness in the centre of 0.8–1 μm, being much smaller than most other human cells. These cells have an average volume of about 90 fL with a surface area of about 136 μm^{2}, and can swell up to a sphere shape containing 150 fL, without membrane distension.

Adult humans have roughly 20–30 trillion red blood cells at any given time, constituting approximately 70% of all cells by number. Women have about 4–5 million red blood cells per microliter (cubic millimeter) of blood and men about 5–6 million; people living at high altitudes with low oxygen tension will have more. Red blood cells are thus much more common than the other blood particles: there are about 4,000–11,000 white blood cells and about 150,000–400,000 platelets per microliter.

Human red blood cells take on average 60 seconds to complete one cycle of circulation.

The blood's red color is due to the spectral properties of the hemic iron ions in hemoglobin. Each hemoglobin molecule carries four heme groups; hemoglobin constitutes about a third of the total cell volume. Hemoglobin is responsible for the transport of more than 98% of the oxygen in the body (the remaining oxygen is carried dissolved in the blood plasma). The red blood cells of an average adult human male store collectively about 2.5 grams of iron, representing about 65% of the total iron contained in the body.

== Microstructure ==
=== Nucleus ===
Red blood cells in mammals are anucleate when mature, meaning that they lack a cell nucleus. In comparison, the red blood cells of other vertebrates have nuclei; the only known exceptions are salamanders of the family Plethodontidae, where five different clades has evolved various degrees of enucleated red blood cells (most evolved in some species of the genus Batrachoseps), and fish of the genus Maurolicus.

The elimination of the nucleus in vertebrate red blood cells has been offered as an explanation for the subsequent accumulation of non-coding DNA in the genome. The argument runs as follows: Efficient gas transport requires red blood cells to pass through very narrow capillaries, and this constrains their size. In the absence of nuclear elimination, the accumulation of repeat sequences is constrained by the volume occupied by the nucleus, which increases with genome size.

Nucleated red blood cells in mammals consist of two forms: normoblasts, which are normal erythropoietic precursors to mature red blood cells, and megaloblasts, which are abnormally large precursors that occur in megaloblastic anemias.

=== Membrane composition ===
Red blood cells are deformable, flexible, are able to adhere to other cells, and are able to interface with immune cells. Their membrane plays many roles in this. These functions are highly dependent on the membrane composition. The red blood cell membrane is composed of 3 layers: the glycocalyx on the exterior, which is rich in carbohydrates; the lipid bilayer which contains many transmembrane proteins, besides its lipidic main constituents; and the membrane skeleton, a structural network of proteins located on the inner surface of the lipid bilayer. Half of the membrane mass in human and most mammalian red blood cells are proteins. The other half are lipids, namely phospholipids and cholesterol.

==== Membrane lipids ====
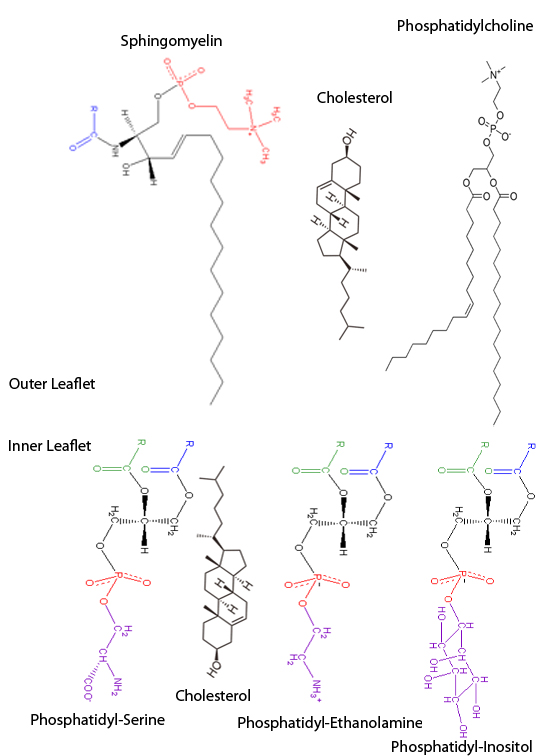
The most common red blood cell membrane lipids, schematically disposed as they are distributed on the bilayer. Relative abundances are not at scale.

The red blood cell membrane comprises a typical lipid bilayer, similar to what can be found in virtually all human cells. Simply put, this lipid bilayer is composed of cholesterol and phospholipids in equal proportions by weight. The lipid composition is important as it defines many physical properties such as membrane permeability and fluidity. Additionally, the activity of many membrane proteins is regulated by interactions with lipids in the bilayer.

Unlike cholesterol, which is evenly distributed between the inner and outer leaflets, the 5 major phospholipids are asymmetrically disposed, as shown below:

Outer monolayer

- Phosphatidylcholine (PC);
- Sphingomyelin (SM).

Inner monolayer

- Phosphatidylethanolamine (PE);
- Phosphoinositol (PI) (small amounts).
- Phosphatidylserine (PS);

This asymmetric phospholipid distribution among the bilayer is the result of the function of several energy-dependent and energy-independent phospholipid transport proteins. Proteins called "Flippases" move phospholipids from the outer to the inner monolayer, while others called "floppases" do the opposite operation, against a concentration gradient in an energy-dependent manner. Additionally, there are also "scramblase" proteins that move phospholipids in both directions at the same time, down their concentration gradients in an energy-independent manner. There is still considerable debate ongoing regarding the identity of these membrane maintenance proteins in the red cell membrane.

The maintenance of an asymmetric phospholipid distribution in the bilayer (such as an exclusive localization of PS and PIs in the inner monolayer) is critical for the cell integrity and function due to several reasons:

- Macrophages recognize and phagocytose red cells that expose PS at their outer surface. Thus the confinement of PS in the inner monolayer is essential if the cell is to survive its frequent encounters with macrophages of the reticuloendothelial system, especially in the spleen.
- Premature destruction of thallassemic and sickle red cells has been linked to disruptions of lipid asymmetry leading to exposure of PS on the outer monolayer.
- An exposure of PS can potentiate adhesion of red cells to vascular endothelial cells, effectively preventing normal transit through the microvasculature. Thus it is important that PS is maintained only in the inner leaflet of the bilayer to ensure normal blood flow in microcirculation.
- Both PS and phosphatidylinositol 4,5-bisphosphate (PIP_{2}) can regulate membrane mechanical function, due to their interactions with skeletal proteins such as spectrin and protein 4.1R. Recent studies have shown that binding of spectrin to PS promotes membrane mechanical stability. PIP_{2} enhances the binding of protein band 4.1R to glycophorin C but decreases its interaction with protein band 3, and thereby may modulate the linkage of the bilayer to the membrane skeleton.

The presence of specialized structures named "lipid rafts" in the red blood cell membrane have been described by recent studies. These are structures enriched in cholesterol and sphingolipids associated with specific membrane proteins, namely flotillins, STOMatins (band 7), G-proteins, and β-adrenergic receptors. Lipid rafts that have been implicated in cell signaling events in nonerythroid cells have been shown in erythroid cells to mediate β2-adregenic receptor signaling and increase cAMP levels, and thus regulating entry of malarial parasites into normal red cells.

==== Membrane proteins ====
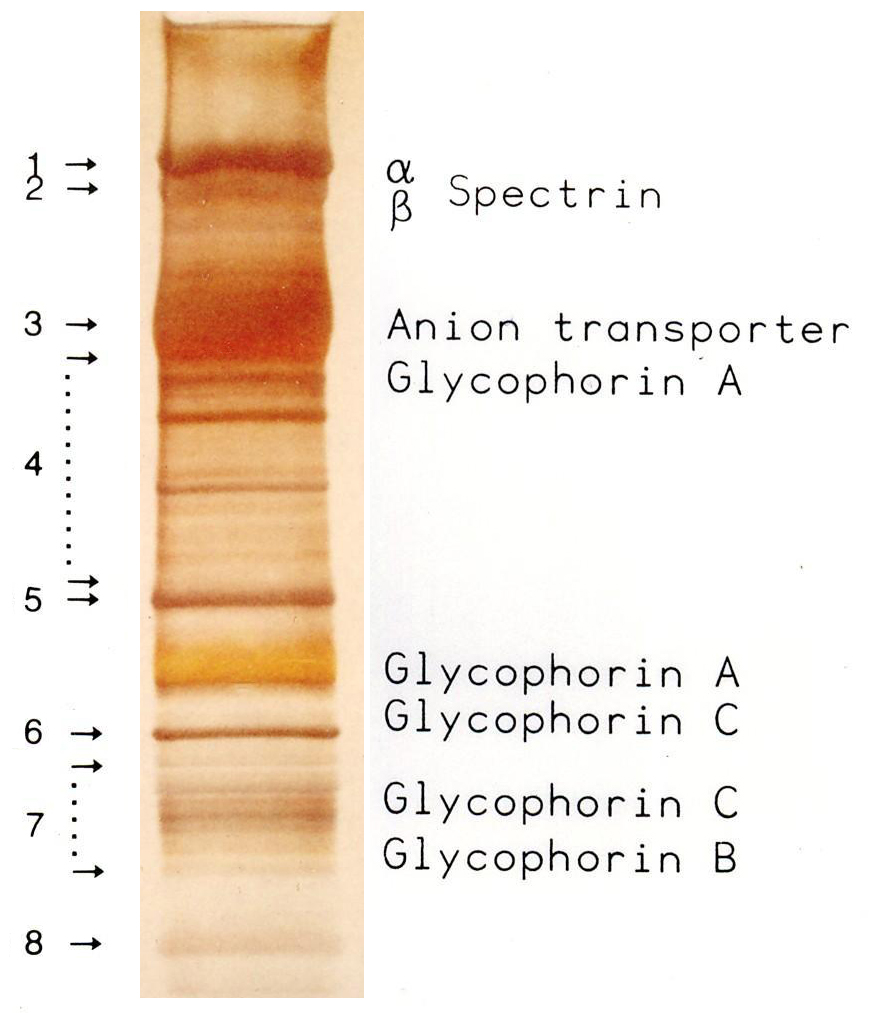
Red blood cell membrane proteins separated by SDS-PAGE and silverstained

The proteins of the membrane skeleton are responsible for the deformability, flexibility and durability of the red blood cell, enabling it to squeeze through capillaries less than half the diameter of the red blood cell (7–8 μm) and recovering the discoid shape as soon as these cells stop receiving compressive forces, in a similar fashion to an object made of rubber.

There are currently more than 50 known membrane proteins, which can exist in a few hundred up to a million copies per red blood cell. Approximately 25 of these membrane proteins carry the various blood group antigens, such as the A, B and Rh antigens, among many others. These membrane proteins can perform a wide diversity of functions, such as transporting ions and molecules across the red cell membrane, adhesion and interaction with other cells such as endothelial cells, as signaling receptors, as well as other currently unknown functions. The blood types of humans are due to variations in surface glycoproteins of red blood cells. Disorders of the proteins in these membranes are associated with many disorders, such as hereditary spherocytosis, hereditary elliptocytosis, hereditary stomatocytosis, and paroxysmal nocturnal hemoglobinuria.

The red blood cell membrane proteins organized according to their function:

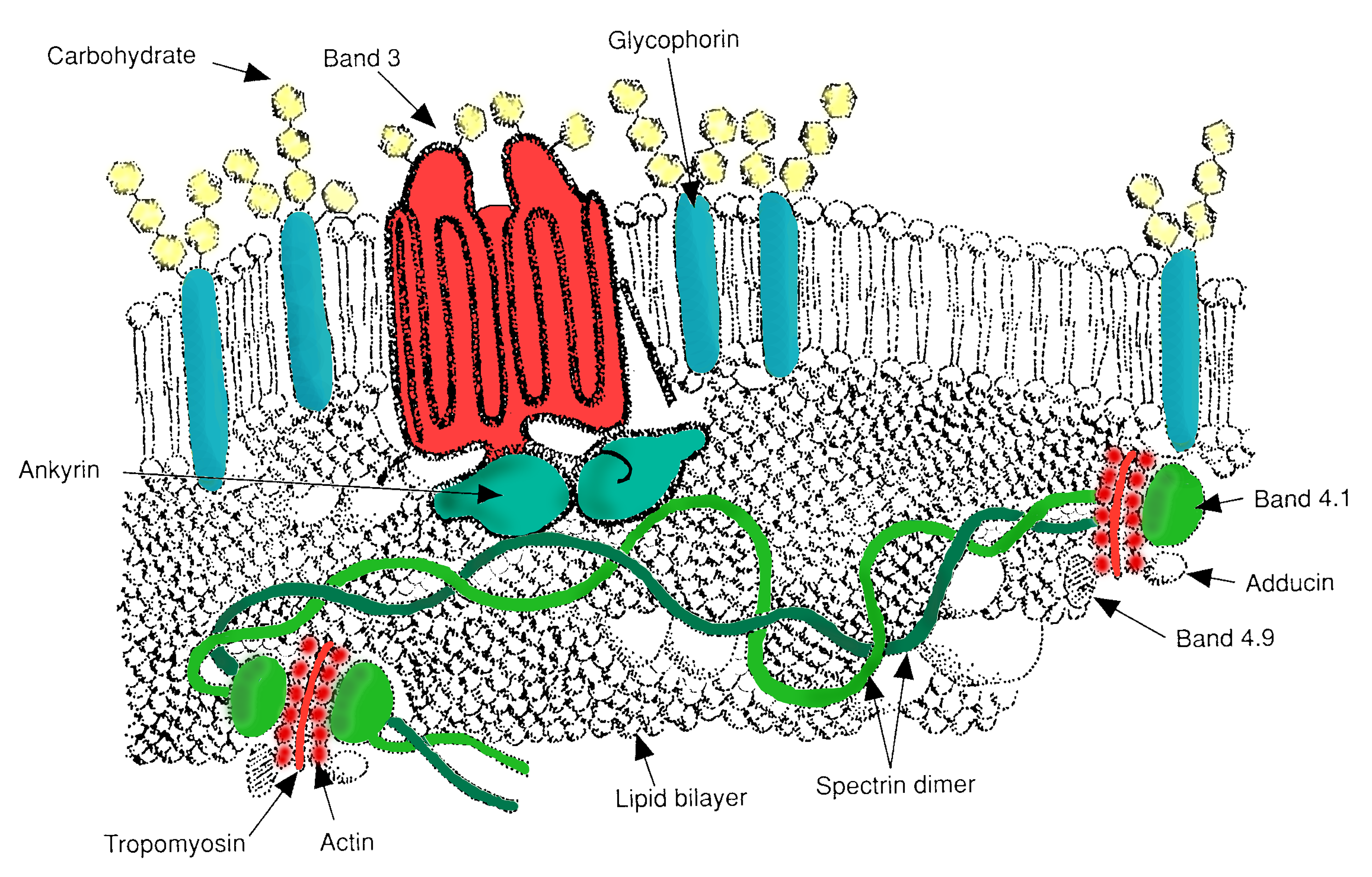
Red blood cell membrane major proteins

Transport

- Band 3 – Anion transporter, also an important structural component of the red blood cell membrane, makes up to 25% of the cell membrane surface, each red cell contains approximately one million copies. Defines the Diego Blood Group;
- Aquaporin 1 – water transporter, defines the Colton Blood Group;
- Glut1 – glucose and L-dehydroascorbic acid transporter;
- MCT1 – Monocarboxylate transporter for exporting Lactic acid to the liver. See Cori cycle.;
- Kidd antigen protein – urea transporter;
- RHAG – gas transporter, probably of carbon dioxide, defines Rh Blood Group and the associated unusual blood group phenotype Rh_{null};
- Na^{+}/K^{+} – ATPase;
- Ca^{2+} – ATPase;
- Na^{+} K^{+} 2Cl^{−} – cotransporter;
- Na^{+}-Cl^{−} – cotransporter;
- Na-H exchanger;
- K-Cl – cotransporter;
- Gardos Channel.

Cell adhesion

- ICAM-4 – interacts with integrins;
- BCAM – a glycoprotein that defines the Lutheran blood group and also known as Lu or laminin-binding protein.

Structural role – The following membrane proteins establish linkages with skeletal proteins and may play an important role in regulating cohesion between the lipid bilayer and membrane skeleton, likely enabling the red cell to maintain its favorable membrane surface area by preventing the membrane from collapsing (vesiculating).

- Ankyrin-based macromolecular complex – proteins linking the bilayer to the membrane skeleton through the interaction of their cytoplasmic domains with Ankyrin.
  - Band 3 – also assembles various glycolytic enzymes, the presumptive CO_{2} transporter, and carbonic anhydrase into a macromolecular complex termed a "metabolon", which may play a key role in regulating red cell metabolism and ion and gas transport function.
  - RHAG – also involved in transport, defines associated unusual blood group phenotype Rh_{mod}.
- Protein 4.1R-based macromolecular complex – proteins interacting with Protein 4.1R.
  - Protein 4.1R – weak expression of Gerbich antigens;
  - Glycophorin C and D – glycoprotein, defines Gerbich Blood Group;
  - XK – defines the Kell Blood Group and the Mcleod unusual phenotype (lack of Kx antigen and greatly reduced expression of Kell antigens);
  - RhD/RhCE – defines Rh Blood Group and the associated unusual blood group phenotype Rh_{null};
  - Duffy protein – has been proposed to be associated with chemokine clearance;
  - Adducin – interaction with band 3;
  - Dematin- interaction with the Glut1 glucose transporter.

=== Surface electrostatic potential ===
The zeta potential is an electrochemical property of cell surfaces that is determined by the net electrical charge of molecules exposed at the surface of cell membranes of the cell. The normal zeta potential of the red blood cell is −15.7 millivolts (mV). Much of this potential appears to be contributed by the exposed sialic acid residues in the membrane: their removal results in zeta potential of −6.06 mV.

== Function ==
=== Role in CO_{2} transport ===
Recall that respiration, as illustrated schematically here with a unit of carbohydrate, produces about as many molecules of carbon dioxide, CO_{2}, as it consumes of oxygen, O_{2}.

$$\ce{HCOH + O2 -> CO2 + H2O}$$

Thus, the function of the circulatory system is as much about the transport of carbon dioxide as about the transport of oxygen. As stated elsewhere in this article, most of the carbon dioxide in the blood is in the form of bicarbonate ion. The bicarbonate provides a critical pH buffer. Thus, unlike hemoglobin for O_{2} transport, there is a physiological advantage to not having a specific CO_{2} transporter molecule.

Red blood cells, nevertheless, play a key role in the CO_{2} transport process, for two reasons. First, because, besides hemoglobin, they contain a large number of copies of the enzyme carbonic anhydrase on the inside of their cell membrane. Carbonic anhydrase, as its name suggests, acts as a catalyst of the exchange between carbonic acid and carbon dioxide (which is the anhydride of carbonic acid). Because it is a catalyst, it can affect many CO_{2} molecules, so it performs its essential role without needing as many copies as are needed for O_{2} transport by hemoglobin. In the presence of this catalyst carbon dioxide and carbonic acid reach an equilibrium very rapidly, while the red cells are still moving through the capillary. Thus it is the RBC that ensures that most of the CO_{2} is transported as bicarbonate. At physiological pH the equilibrium strongly favors carbonic acid, which is mostly dissociated into bicarbonate ion.

$$\ce{CO2 + H2O <=>> H2CO3 <=>> HCO3- + H+}$$

The H+ ions released by this rapid reaction within RBC, while still in the capillary, act to reduce the oxygen binding affinity of hemoglobin, the Bohr effect.

The second major contribution of RBC to carbon dioxide transport is that carbon dioxide directly reacts with globin protein components of hemoglobin to form carbaminohemoglobin compounds. As oxygen is released in the tissues, more CO_{2} binds to hemoglobin, and as oxygen binds in the lung, it displaces the hemoglobin bound CO_{2}, this is called the Haldane effect. Despite the fact that only a small amount of the CO_{2} in blood is bound to hemoglobin in venous blood, a greater proportion of the change in CO_{2} content between venous and arterial blood comes from the change in this bound CO_{2}. That is, there is always an abundance of bicarbonate in blood, both venous and arterial, because of its aforementioned role as a pH buffer.

In summary, carbon dioxide produced by cellular respiration diffuses very rapidly to areas of lower concentration, specifically into nearby capillaries. When it diffuses into a RBC, CO_{2} is rapidly converted by the carbonic anhydrase found on the inside of the RBC membrane into bicarbonate ion. The bicarbonate ions in turn leave the RBC in exchange for chloride ions from the plasma, facilitated by the band 3 anion transport protein colocated in the RBC membrane. The bicarbonate ion does not diffuse back out of the capillary, but is carried to the lung. In the lung the lower partial pressure of carbon dioxide in the alveoli causes carbon dioxide to diffuse rapidly from the capillary into the alveoli. The carbonic anhydrase in the red cells keeps the bicarbonate ion in equilibrium with carbon dioxide. So as carbon dioxide leaves the capillary, and CO_{2} is displaced by O_{2} on hemoglobin, sufficient bicarbonate ion converts rapidly to carbon dioxide to maintain the equilibrium.

=== Secondary functions ===
When red blood cells undergo shear stress in constricted vessels, they release ATP, which causes the vessel walls to relax and dilate so as to promote normal blood flow.

When their hemoglobin molecules are deoxygenated, red blood cells release S-Nitrosothiols, which also act to dilate blood vessels, thus directing more blood to areas of the body depleted of oxygen.

Red blood cells can also synthesize nitric oxide enzymatically, using L-arginine as substrate, as do endothelial cells. Exposure of red blood cells to physiological levels of shear stress activates nitric oxide synthase and export of nitric oxide, which may contribute to the regulation of vascular tonus.

Red blood cells can also produce hydrogen sulfide, a signalling gas that acts to relax vessel walls. It is believed that the cardioprotective effects of garlic are due to red blood cells converting its sulfur compounds into hydrogen sulfide.

Red blood cells also play a part in the body's immune response: when lysed by pathogens such as bacteria, their hemoglobin releases free radicals, which break down the pathogen's cell wall and membrane, killing it.

=== Cellular processes ===
As a result of not containing mitochondria, red blood cells use none of the oxygen they transport; instead they produce the energy carrier ATP by the glycolysis of glucose and lactic acid fermentation on the resulting pyruvate. Furthermore, the pentose phosphate pathway plays an important role in red blood cells; see glucose-6-phosphate dehydrogenase deficiency for more information.

As red blood cells contain no nucleus, protein biosynthesis is currently assumed to be absent in these cells.

Because of the lack of nuclei and organelles, mature red blood cells do not contain DNA and cannot synthesize any RNA (although it does contain RNAs), and consequently cannot divide and have limited repair capabilities. The inability to carry out protein synthesis means that no virus can evolve to target mammalian red blood cells. However, infection with parvoviruses (such as human parvovirus B19) can affect erythroid precursors while they still have DNA, as recognized by the presence of giant pronormoblasts with viral particles and inclusion bodies, thus temporarily depleting the blood of reticulocytes and causing anemia.

== Life cycle ==
Human red blood cells are produced through a process named erythropoiesis, developing from committed stem cells to mature red blood cells in about 7 days. When matured, in a healthy individual these cells live in blood circulation for about 100 to 120 days (and 80 to 90 days in a full term infant). At the end of their lifespan, they are removed from circulation. In many chronic diseases, the lifespan of the red blood cells is reduced.

=== Creation ===
Erythropoiesis is the process by which new red blood cells are produced; it lasts about 7 days. Through this process red blood cells are continuously produced in the red bone marrow of large bones. (In the embryo, the liver is the main site of red blood cell production.) The production can be stimulated by the hormone erythropoietin (EPO), synthesised by the kidney. Just before and after leaving the bone marrow, the developing cells are known as reticulocytes; these constitute about 1% of circulating red blood cells.

=== Functional lifetime ===
The functional lifetime of a red blood cell is about 100–120 days, during which time the red blood cells are continually moving in the circulatory system.

=== Senescence ===
The aging red blood cell undergoes changes in its plasma membrane, making it susceptible to selective recognition by macrophages and subsequent phagocytosis in the mononuclear phagocyte system (spleen, liver and lymph nodes), thus removing old and defective cells and continually purging the blood. This process is termed eryptosis, red blood cell programmed death. This process normally occurs at the same rate of production by erythropoiesis, balancing the total circulating red blood cell count. Eryptosis is increased in a wide variety of diseases including sepsis, haemolytic uremic syndrome, malaria, sickle cell anemia, beta-thalassemia, glucose-6-phosphate dehydrogenase deficiency, phosphate depletion, iron deficiency and Wilson's disease. Eryptosis can be elicited by osmotic shock, oxidative stress, and energy depletion, as well as by a wide variety of endogenous mediators and xenobiotics. Excessive eryptosis is observed in red blood cells lacking the cGMP-dependent protein kinase type I or the AMP-activated protein kinase AMPK. Inhibitors of eryptosis include erythropoietin, nitric oxide, catecholamines and high concentrations of urea.

Much of the resulting breakdown products are recirculated in the body. The heme constituent of hemoglobin are broken down into iron (Fe^{3+}) and biliverdin. The biliverdin is reduced to bilirubin, which is released into the plasma and recirculated to the liver bound to albumin. The iron is released into the plasma to be recirculated by a carrier protein called transferrin. Almost all red blood cells are removed in this manner from the circulation before they are old enough to hemolyze. Hemolyzed hemoglobin is bound to a protein in plasma called haptoglobin, which is not excreted by the kidney.

== Clinical significance ==
=== Disease ===
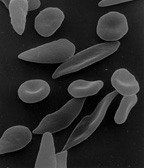
Affected by Sickle-cell disease, red blood cells alter shape and threaten to damage internal organs.

Blood diseases involving the red blood cells include:

- Anemias (or anaemias) are diseases characterized by low oxygen transport capacity of the blood, because of low red cell count or some abnormality of the red blood cells or the hemoglobin.

- Iron deficiency anemia is the most common anemia; it occurs when the dietary intake or absorption of iron is insufficient, and hemoglobin, which contains iron, cannot be formed.

- Pernicious anemia is an autoimmune disease wherein the body lacks intrinsic factor, required to absorb vitamin B_{12} from food. Vitamin B_{12} is needed for the production of red blood cells and hemoglobin.

- Sickle-cell disease is a genetic disease that results in abnormal hemoglobin molecules. When these release their oxygen load in the tissues, they become insoluble, leading to mis-shaped red blood cells. These sickle shaped red cells are less deformable and viscoelastic, meaning that they have become rigid and can cause blood vessel blockage, pain, strokes, and other tissue damage.

- Thalassemia is a genetic disease that results in the production of an abnormal ratio of hemoglobin subunits.

- Hereditary spherocytosis syndromes are a group of inherited disorders characterized by defects in the red blood cell's cell membrane, causing the cells to be small, sphere-shaped, and fragile instead of donut-shaped and flexible. These abnormal red blood cells are destroyed by the spleen. Several other hereditary disorders of the red blood cell membrane are known.

- Aplastic anemia is caused by the inability of the bone marrow to produce blood cells.

- Pure red cell aplasia is caused by the inability of the bone marrow to produce only red blood cells.

Effect of osmotic pressure on blood cells

Micrographs of the effects of osmotic pressure

- Hemolysis is the general term for excessive breakdown of red blood cells. It can have several causes and can result in hemolytic anemia.

- The malaria parasite spends part of its life-cycle in red blood cells, feeds on their hemoglobin and then breaks them apart, causing fever. Both sickle-cell disease and thalassemia are more common in malaria areas, because these mutations convey some protection against the parasite.

- Polycythemias (or erythrocytoses) are diseases characterized by a surplus of red blood cells. The increased viscosity of the blood can cause a number of symptoms.

- In polycythemia vera the increased number of red blood cells results from an abnormality in the bone marrow.

- Several microangiopathic diseases, including disseminated intravascular coagulation and thrombotic microangiopathies, present with pathognomonic (diagnostic) red blood cell fragments called schistocytes. These pathologies generate fibrin strands that sever red blood cells as they try to move past a thrombus.

=== Transfusion ===
Red blood cells may be given as part of a blood transfusion. Blood may be donated from another person, or stored by the recipient at an earlier date. Donated blood usually requires screening to ensure that donors do not contain risk factors for the presence of blood-borne diseases, or will not suffer themselves by giving blood. Blood is usually collected and tested for common or serious blood-borne diseases including Hepatitis B, Hepatitis C and HIV. The blood type (A, B, AB, or O) or the blood product is identified and matched with the recipient's blood to minimise the likelihood of acute hemolytic transfusion reaction, a type of transfusion reaction. This relates to the presence of antigens on the cell's surface. After this process, the blood is stored, and within a short duration is used. Blood can be given as a whole product or the red blood cells separated as packed red blood cells.

Blood is often transfused when there is known anaemia, active bleeding, or when there is an expectation of serious blood loss, such as prior to an operation. Before blood is given, a small sample of the recipient's blood is tested with the transfusion in a process known as cross-matching.

In 2008 it was reported that human embryonic stem cells had been successfully coaxed into becoming red blood cells in the lab. The difficult step was to induce the cells to eject their nucleus; this was achieved by growing the cells on stromal cells from the bone marrow. It is hoped that these artificial red blood cells can eventually be used for blood transfusions.

A human trial is conducted in 2022, using blood cultured from stem cells obtained from donor blood.

=== Tests ===
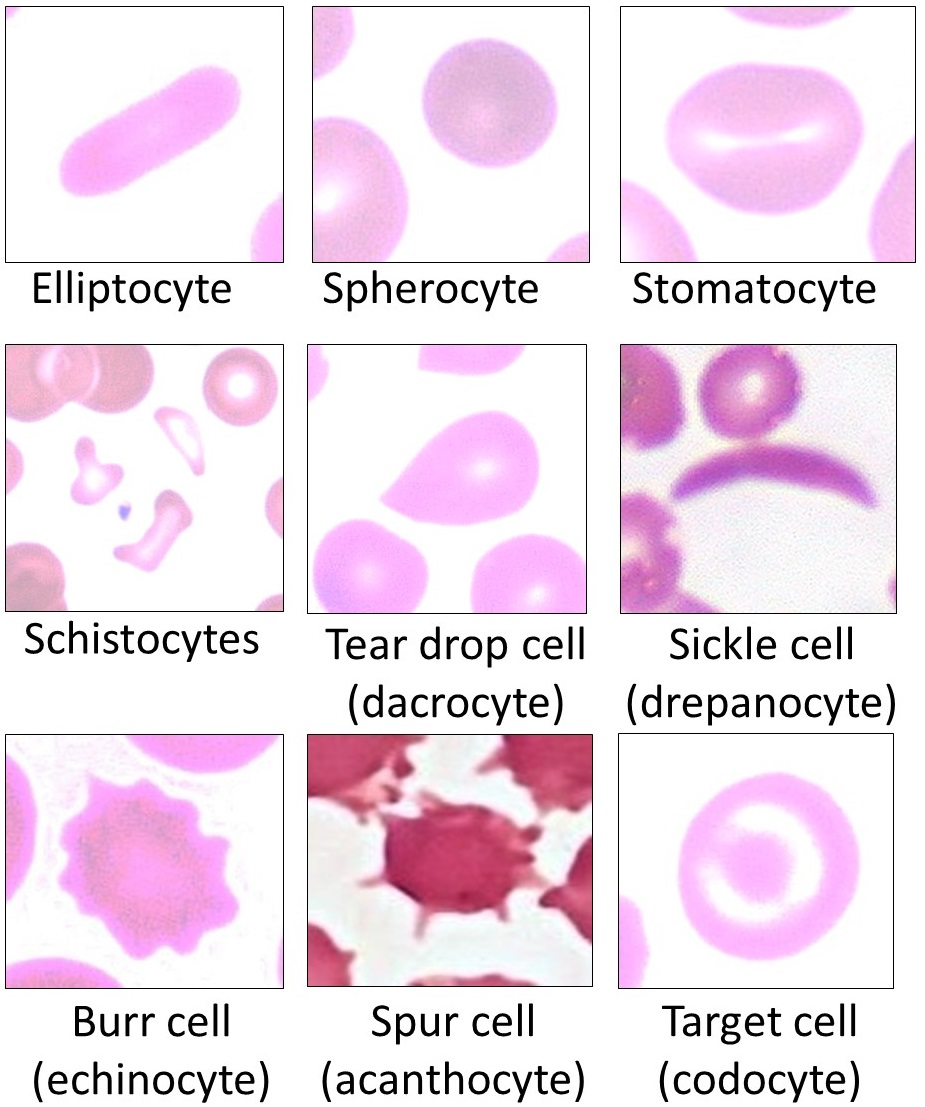
Variations of red blood cell shape, overall termed poikilocytosis

Several blood tests involve red blood cells. These include a RBC count (the number of red blood cells per volume of blood), calculation of the hematocrit (percentage of blood volume occupied by red blood cells), and the erythrocyte sedimentation rate. The blood type needs to be determined to prepare for a blood transfusion or an organ transplantation.

Many diseases involving red blood cells are diagnosed with a blood film (or peripheral blood smear), where a thin layer of blood is smeared on a microscope slide. This may reveal poikilocytosis, which are variations in red blood cell shape. When red blood cells sometimes occur as a stack, flat side next to flat side. This is known as rouleaux formation, and it occurs more often if the levels of certain serum proteins are elevated, as for instance during inflammation.

=== Separation and blood doping ===
Red blood cells can be obtained from whole blood by centrifugation, which separates the cells from the blood plasma in a process known as blood fractionation. Packed red blood cells, which are made in this way from whole blood with the plasma removed, are used in transfusion medicine. During plasma donation, the red blood cells are pumped back into the body right away and only the plasma is collected.

Some athletes have tried to improve their performance by blood doping: first about 1 litre of their blood is extracted, then the red blood cells are isolated, frozen and stored, to be reinjected shortly before the competition. (Red blood cells can be conserved for 5 weeks at −79 °C or −110 °F, or over 10 years using cryoprotectants) This practice is hard to detect but may endanger the human cardiovascular system which is not equipped to deal with blood of the resulting higher viscosity. Another method of blood doping involves injection with erythropoietin to stimulate production of red blood cells. Both practices are banned by the World Anti-Doping Agency.

== History ==
The first person to describe red blood cells was the young Dutch biologist Jan Swammerdam, who had used an early microscope in 1658 to study the blood of a frog. Unaware of this work, Anton van Leeuwenhoek provided another microscopic description in 1674, this time providing a more precise description of red blood cells, even approximating their size, "25,000 times smaller than a fine grain of sand".

In the 1740s, Vincenzo Menghini in Bologna was able to demonstrate the presence of iron by passing magnets over the powder or ash remaining from heated red blood cells.

In 1901, Karl Landsteiner published his discovery of the three main blood groups—A, B, and C (which he later renamed to O). Landsteiner described the regular patterns in which reactions occurred when serum was mixed with red blood cells, thus identifying compatible and conflicting combinations between these blood groups. A year later Alfred von Decastello and Adriano Sturli, two colleagues of Landsteiner, identified a fourth blood group—AB.

In 1959, by use of X-ray crystallography, Max Perutz was able to unravel the structure of hemoglobin, the red blood cell protein that carries oxygen.

The oldest intact red blood cells ever discovered were found in Ötzi the Iceman, a natural mummy of a man who died around 3255 BCE. These cells were discovered in May 2012.

== See also ==
- List of distinct cell types in the adult human body
- Altitude training
- Blood substitute
- Er blood group collection
- Erythrocrine
- Red blood cell indices
- Serum (blood)
