= Phagoptosis =

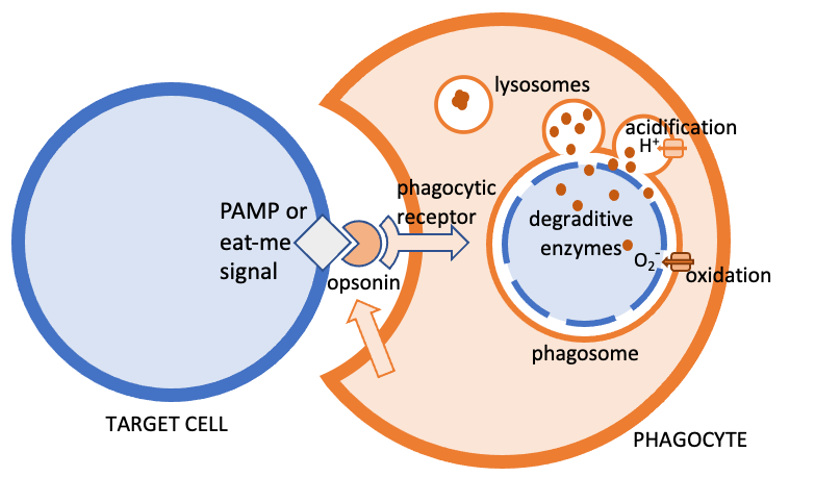
Phagoptosis occurs when signals on the surface of a (target) cell activate phagocytic receptors on a phagocyte, inducing uptake into a phagosome, where the cell is killed and digested.

Phagoptosis (cell death by phagocytosis) is a type of cell death caused by the cell being phagocytosed (i.e. eaten) by another cell, and therefore this form of cell death is prevented by blocking phagocytosis.

Phagocytosis of an otherwise-viable cell may occur because the cell is recognised as stressed, activated, senescent, damaged, pathogenic or non-self, or is misrecognised. Cells are phagocytosed as a result of: i) expressing "eat-me" signals on their surface, ii) losing "don’t-eat-me" signals, and/or iii) binding of opsonins. It is clear that otherwise-viable cells can expose/bind such phagocytosis-promoting signals as a result of cell stress, activation or senescence. Phagoptosis is probably the most common form of cell death in the body as it is responsible for erythrocyte turnover. And there is increasing evidence that it mediates physiological death of neutrophils, T cells, platelets and stem cells, and thereby regulates inflammation, immunity, clotting and neurogenesis. Phagoptosis is a major form of host defence against pathogens and cancer cells. However, recent evidence indicates that excessive phagoptosis may kill host cells in inflammatory conditions, contributing to haemophagic conditions, and neuronal loss in the inflamed brain.

== Mechanism ==
Phagoptosis is normally caused by: the cell exposing on its surface so-called "eat-me" signals, and/or the cell no longer exposing "don't-eat-me" signals and/or the cell being opsonised i.e. binding soluble proteins that tag the cell for phagocytosis. For example, phosphatidylserine is an "eat-me" signal that, when exposed on the surface of a cell, triggers phagocytes (i.e. cells that eat other cells) to eat that cell. Phosphatidylserine is normally found on the inside of healthy cells, but can become exposed on the surface of dying, activated or stressed cells. Phagocytosis of such cells requires specific receptors on the phagocyte that recognise either phosphatidylserine directly or opsonins bound to the phosphatidylserine or other "eat-me" signals, such as calreticulin. "Don't-eat-me" signals include CD47, which when expressed on the surface of a cell, inhibit phagocytosis of that cell, by activating SIRP-alpha receptors on the phagocyte. Opsonins are normally soluble proteins, which when bound to the surface of a cell induce phagocytes to phagocytose that cell. Opsonins include Mfge8, Gas6, Protein S, antibodies and complement factors C1q and C3b.

== Functions ==
Phagoptosis has multiple functions including removal and disposal of: pathogenic cells, aged cells, damaged cells, stressed cells and activated cells. Pathogenic cells such as bacteria can be opsonised by antibodies or complement factors, enabling their phagocytosis and phagoptosis by macrophages and neutrophils. "Aged" erythrocytes and neutrophils, as well as "activated" platelets, neutrophils and T-cells, are thought to be phagocytosed alive by macrophages.

Development. Phagoptosis removes excess cells during development in the worm, C. elegans. During mammalian development multiple cells undergo programmed cell senescence and are then phagocytosed by macrophages. Brain macrophages (microglia) can regulate the number of neural precursor cells in the developing brain by phagocytosing these otherwise viable precursors and thus limiting neurogenesis.

Turnover of blood cells. Red blood cells (erythrocytes) live for roughly 4 months in the blood before being phagocytosed by macrophages. Old erythrocytes do not die, but rather display changes in the cell surface that enable macrophages to recognise them as old or damaged, including exposure of phosphatidylserine, desialylation of glycoproteins, loss or changed conformation of the "don't-eat-me" signal CD47, and exposure of novel antigens that bind endogenous antibodies. Neutrophils have a daily rhythm of entry and exit from the blood, driven by neutrophil “aging” in the circulation, causing decreased expression of CD62L and increased expression of CXCR4, which directs the “aged” neutrophils to the bone marrow, where they are phagocytosed by macrophages. However, it is still unclear how or why neutrophils turnover at such an enormous rate. Antigen recognition causes phosphatidylserine exposure on activated T-cells, which is recognized by Tim-4 on macrophages, inducing phagoptosis of the activated T-cells, and thus the contraction phase of the adaptive response.

Host defence against pathogens. Phagocytosis of otherwise-viable pathogens, such as bacteria, can be mediated by neutrophils, monocytes, macrophages, microglia and dendritic cells, and is central to host defence against pathogens. Dendritic cells can phagocytose viable neutrophils, and present antigens derived from bacteria or cancer cell debris previously phagocytosed by the neutrophils. Thus phagoptosis can contribute to host defence in a variety of ways.

Host defence against cancer. It has been known for some time that animals defend themselves against cancer by antibody-mediated or antibody-independent phagocytosis of viable tumour cells by macrophages. Recognition of viable cancer cells for phagocytosis may be based on the expression of novel antigens, senescence markers, phosphatidylserine or calreticulin. More recently it has become clear that most human cancer cells overexpress CD47 on their surface to prevent themselves being phagocytosed, and that if this ‘don’t-eat-me’ signalling is blocked then a variety of cancers can be cleared from the body. Thus it would appear that phagoptosis is an important defence against cancer, but that tumour cells can suppress this, and blocking this suppression is an attractive therapeutic option.

Pathological phagoptosis of blood cells. Hemophagocytosis is a clinical condition, found in many infectious and inflammatory disorders, where activated macrophages have engulfed apparently viable blood cells, resulting in reduced white or red cell count (cytopenia). IFN-γ (and possibly other cytokines) appears to drive hemophagocytosis during infection by directly stimulating phagoptosis of blood cells by macrophages. Hemophagocytic lymphohistiocytosis (HLH) is characterized by excessive engulfment of hematopoietic stem cells (HSCs) by bone marrow macrophages, and this has been found to result from down regulation of CD47 expression on HSCs, enabling macrophages to eat them alive.

Pathological phagoptosis in the brain. Microglial phagocytosis of stressed-but-viable neurons occurs under inflammatory conditions, and may contribute to neuronal loss in brain pathologies.
