= Biconcave disc =

Geometric shape

A biconcave disc

In geometry and mathematical biology, a biconcave disc — also referred to as a discocyte — is a geometric shape resembling an oblate spheroid with two concavities on the top and on the bottom.

Biconcave discs appear in the study of cell biology, as an approximation to the shape of certain cells, including red blood cells.

== Mathematical model ==
A biconcave disc can be described mathematically by

$$z(r) = D \sqrt{1 - \frac{4r^2}{D^2}} \left(a_0 + \frac{a_1 r^2}{D^2} + \frac{a_2 r^4}{D^4} \right)$$

where z(r) is the height of the surface as a function of radius r, D is the diameter of the disc, and a_{0}, a_{1}, a_{2} are coefficients describing the shape. The above model describes a smooth surface; actual cells can be much more irregular.

== Biology ==
Erythrocytes, also known as red blood cells that transport oxygen to and from tissues, are in the shape of a biconcave disc. Research findings state that owing to the turbulent flow in the cardiovascular system, the human erythrocytes adopt a biconcave disc shape to maximise laminar flow and minimise platelet scatter. The biconcave shape has more mass distributed on the periphery which increases its moment of inertia and makes the cell less prone to rotation during flow which promotes laminar flow and reduces platelet scattering by minimising "Eddy currents" and thus, also suppresses atherogenic activity in the large vessels.
