= Saline flush =

Method of cleaning IV tubes

A saline flush is the method of clearing intravenous lines (IVs), central lines or arterial lines of any medicine or other perishable liquids to keep the lines (tubes) and entry area clean and sterile. Typically in flushing an intravenous cannula, a 5 - 10ml syringe of saline is emptied into the medication port of the cannula's connecting hub after insertion of the cannula. A 10ml syringe needs to be used to ensure correct pressure, whether you are giving 5ml or 10ml. Blood left in the cannula or hub can lead to clots forming and blocking the cannula. Flushing is required before a drip is connected to ensure that the IV is still patent.

Flushing is also used after medications are delivered by the medication port to ensure all the drug is delivered fully. If multiple medications are given through the same line, flushing can be used in between drugs to ensure that the medicines won't react. This is especially important if complex regimes of intravenous medication is used such as in chemotherapy.

Flushing with saline should be painless if the cannula is in its proper place, although if the saline is not warmed there may be a cold sensation running up the vein. A painful flush may indicate tissuing or phlebitis and is an indication that the cannula should be relocated.

Solutions other than normal saline may be used. Heparinised saline may be used in flushing arterial lines, to prevent clotting and blockage of the line.

When syringes are used to perform a saline flush, it is important that the syringe not be reused for multiple patients, even though direct contact with the patient does not normally occur.

In angiography, a saline flush is used to improve the dispersion of contrast media before imaging, This can prevent streak artefact due to concentrated bands of contrast media in the superior vena cava and brachiocephalic vein. Flushing can also increase hydration within contrast media, thus reducing the risk of contrast induced nephro toxicity.
