= Eryptosis =

Programmed death of red blood cells

Eryptosis (Erythrocyte apoptosis or Red blood cell programmed death) is a type of apoptosis that occurs in injured erythrocytes (RBCs) because of various factors including hyperosmolarity, oxidative stress, energy depletion, heavy metals exposure or xenobiotics. Like apoptosis, eryptosis is characterized by cell shrinkage, membrane blebbing, activation of proteases, and phosphatidylserine exposure at the outer membrane leaflet.

== Causes ==
Conditions with excessive eryptosis include:

- G6PD deficiency
- Iron deficiency anemia
- Lead or mercury intoxication
- Lopinavir
- Malaria
- Ritonavir
- Sickle cell anemia
- Thalassemia
