= Vincenzo Menghini =

Italian physician and scientist (1704-1759)

Vincenzo Antonio Menghini (15 February 1704-27 January 1759) was an Italian physician and scientist, who was one of the first to report the abundance of iron in red blood cells.

== Biography ==
He was born in Budrio to a family with a small business. His sister, Maria Orsola, would marry the prominent physician Giovanni Giacinto Vogli (1697-1762). He was sent to Bologna to live and study at the Collegio Poeti. He obtained a doctorate in philosophy and medicine from the University of Bologna in 1726, and became a doctor, working mainly in hospitals. He joined the Academy of Sciences in 1725. In 1730 he married Diamante Scarabelli. In 1736 he was appointed docent educator in Logic. The next year he became the professor of Theoretic Medicine, later of Practical Medicine at the university.

In 1745, Pope Benedict XIV established the Accademia Benedettina, a scientific society. Menghini was one of the first members, a position that came with a stipend.

He began studies into the presence of iron in the blood. Prior to Menghini, Giuseppe Badia (1695-1782) had suggested the presence of iron. In 1714, one of Menghini's colleagues in the Academy of Sciences, Domenico Maria Gusmano Galeazzi (1686-1775), attended meetings in Paris at the Academy of Sciences where they discussed the presence of iron in the ashes of incinerated vegetables. Menghini's experiments were published in 1746 in a report in the journal of the Academy of Science of Bologna about De ferrearum particularum sede in sanguine. He took the blood of various birds, fish and mammals, including humans. It was then heated into a dry powder, and tested with a magnet to see how much iron was present. He tested multiple species and organs, and found that the amount of iron was proportionate to the amount of blood in the organ. He was able to demonstrate its presence in the red globules. He began exploring the absorption of iron into the body and its therapeutic actions.
