= Human blood group systems =

Blood antigen set classification systems

The term human blood group systems is defined by the International Society of Blood Transfusion (ISBT) as systems in the human species where cell-surface antigens—in particular, those on blood cells—are "controlled at a single gene locus or by two or more very closely linked homologous genes with little or no observable recombination between them", and include the common ABO and Rh (Rhesus) antigen systems, as well as many others; 48 human systems are identified as of 31 May 2025.

== Table of systems and classifications ==
ISBT No.	System name	System symbol	Structure / function	Chromosome	Antigens	Notes
001	ABO	ABO	Carbohydrate (N-Acetylgalactosamine, galactose)	9q34.2	A, B, H	Mainly elicit IgM antibody reactions, although anti-H is very rare, see the Hh antigen system (Bombay phenotype, ISBT #18).
002	MNS	MNS	GPA / GPB (glycophorins A and B)	4q31.21	M, N, S, s	
003	P1PK	P1PK	Glycolipid	22q13.2	P_{1}, P, and P^{k}	
004	Rh	RH	Protein and glucose	1p36.11	C, c, D, E, e	There is no "d" antigen; lowercase "d" indicates the absence of D.
005	Lutheran	LU	Protein (member of the immunoglobulin superfamily)	19q13.32	21 antigens	
006	Kell	KEL	Glycoprotein	7q34	K, k, Kp^{a}, Kp^{b}, Js^{a} and Js^{b}	
007	Lewis	LE	Carbohydrate (fucose residue)	19p13.3	Mainly Le^{a} and Le^{b}	Associated with tissue ABH antigen secretion.
008	Duffy	FY	Protein (chemokine receptor)	1q23.2	Mainly Fy^{a} and Fy^{b}	Individuals lacking Duffy antigens altogether are immune to malaria caused by Plasmodium vivax and Plasmodium knowlesi.
009	Kidd	JK	Protein (urea transporter)	18q12.3	Jk^{a} and Jk^{b}	
010	Diego	DI	Glycoprotein (band 3, AE 1, or anion exchange)	17q21.31		Positive blood is found only among East Asians and Native Americans.
011	Yt	YT	Protein (AChE, acetylcholinesterase)	7q22.1		
012	Xg	XG	Glycoprotein	Xp22.33		
013	Scianna	SC	Glycoprotein	1p34.2		
014	Dombrock	DO	Glycoprotein (fixed to cell membrane by GPI, or glycosyl-phosphatidyl-inositol)	12p12.3		
015	Colton	CO	Aquaporin 1	7p14.3	Mainly Co(a) and Co(b)	
016	Landsteiner-Wiener	LW	Protein (member of the immunoglobulin superfamily)	19p13.2		
017	Chido/Rodgers	CH	C4A C4B (complement fractions)	6p21.3		
018	Hh	H	Carbohydrate (fucose residue)	19q13.33		
019	Kx	XK	Glycoprotein	Xp21.1		
020	Gerbich	GE	GPC / GPD (Glycophorins C and D)	2q14.3		
021	Cromer	CROM	Glycoprotein (DAF or CD55, regulates complement fractions C3 and C5, attached to the membrane by GPI)	1q32.2		
022	Knops	KN	Glycoprotein (CR1 or CD35, immune complex receptor)	1q32.2		
023	Indian	IN	Glycoprotein (CD44 adhesion function?)	11p13		
024	Ok	OK	Glycoprotein (CD147)	19p13.3		
025	Raph	RAPH	Transmembrane glycoprotein	11p15.5		
026	JohnMiltonHagen	JMH	Protein (fixed to cell membrane by GPI). Also known as Semaphorin 7A or CD108	15q24.1		
027	Ii	I	Branched (I) / unbranched (i) polysaccharide	6p24.2		
028	Globoside	GLOB	Glycolipid, Antigen P	3q26.1		
029	Gill	GIL	Aquaporin 3	9p13.3		
030	Rh-associated glycoprotein	RHAg	Rh-associated glycoprotein	6p21-qter		
031	Forssman	FORS	Globoside alpha-1,3-N-acetylgalactosaminyltransferase 1 (GBGT1)	9q34.13		
032	Langereis	LAN	ABCB6, human ATP-binding cassette (ABC) transporter, mitochondrial porphyrin transporter	2q36		
033	Junior	JR	ABCG2, Multi-drug transporter protein	4q22		
034	Vel	VEL	Human red cell antigens	1p36.32		
035	CD59	CD59	—	11p13		
036	Augustine	AUG	Protein (transporter)	6p21.1		
037	Kanno	KANNO	—	20p13		
038	SID	SID		17q21.32		
039	CTL2	CTL2		19p13.2		
040	PEL	PEL		13q32.1		
041	MAM	MAM		19q13.33		
042	EMM	EMM		4p16.3		
043	ABCC1	ABCC1		16p13.11		
044	Er	ER	Protein	16q24.3	Er^{a}, Er^{b}, Er3, Er4, and Er5	
045	CD36	CD36		7q21.11		
046	ATP11C	ATP11C		Xq27.1		
047	MAL	MAL		2q11.1		
048	PIGZ	PIGZ		3q29		

== Antibodies ==
Following is a comparison of clinically relevant characteristics of antibodies against the main human blood group systems:

	ABO	Rh	Kell	Duffy	Kidd	Lutheran	MNS	Lewis	P	Ii
Most common in immediate hemolytic transfusion reactions	A		Yes	Fy^{a}	Jk^{a}					
Most common in delayed hemolytic transfusion reactions		E,D,C			Jk^{a}					
Most common in hemolytic disease of the newborn	Yes	D,C	Yes							
Commonly produce intravascular hemolysis	Yes				Yes				Yes	
Reactive at room temperature	Yes						M,N	Le^{a}, Le^{b}	P1	
Nearly always clinically insignificant						Yes	M,N	Yes	P1	
Naturally occurring	Yes					Yes	M,N	Yes	Yes	Yes
Enhanced by ficain and papain	Yes	Yes			Yes			Yes	P1	Yes
Destroyed by ficain and papain				Fy^{a}, Fy^{b}		Yes	Yes			
Displaying dosage		Cc, Ee		Yes	Yes		Yes			

== Compatibility testing ==
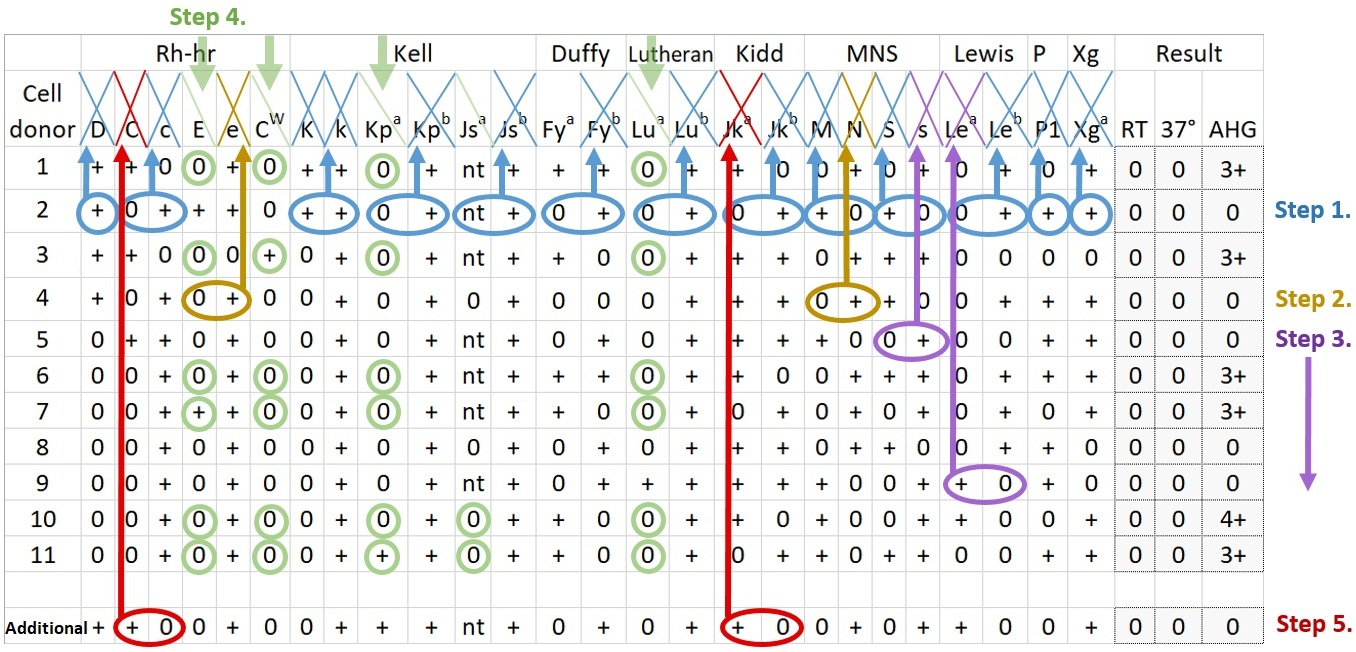
Interpretation of antibody panel to detect patient antibodies towards the most relevant human blood group systems

Blood compatibility testing is performed before blood transfusion, including matching of the ABO blood group system and the Rh blood group system, as well as screening for recipient antibodies against other human blood group systems. Blood compatibility testing is also routinely performed on pregnant women and on the cord blood from newborn babies, because incompatibility puts the baby at risk for developing hemolytic disease of the newborn. It is also used before hematopoietic stem cell transplantation, as it may be responsible for some cases of acute graft-versus-host disease.

Other human blood group systems than ABO and Rh have a relatively small risk of complications when blood is mixed. Therefore, in emergencies such as major hemorrhage, the urgency of transfusion can exceed the need for compatibility testing against other blood group systems (and potentially Rh as well). Also, blood compatibility testing beyond ABO and Rh is generally limited to antibody detection (not necessarily including forward typing). Still, in Europe, women who require blood transfusions are often typed for the K and extended Rh antigens to prevent sensitization to these antigens, which could put them at risk for developing hemolytic disease of the newborn during pregnancy.

When needing to give red blood cell transfusion to a patient, the presence of clinically significant antibodies produced by the patient can be detected by mixing patient serum with 2 to 4 "screening" or "control" red blood cells that together display essentially all relevant antigens. If any of these mixes display a reaction (evidence of patient antibodies binding to the screening red blood cells), a more extensive antibody panel is warranted (as imaged at right).

== See also ==
- Anton blood group antigen
