= P1PK blood group system =

Human blood group system

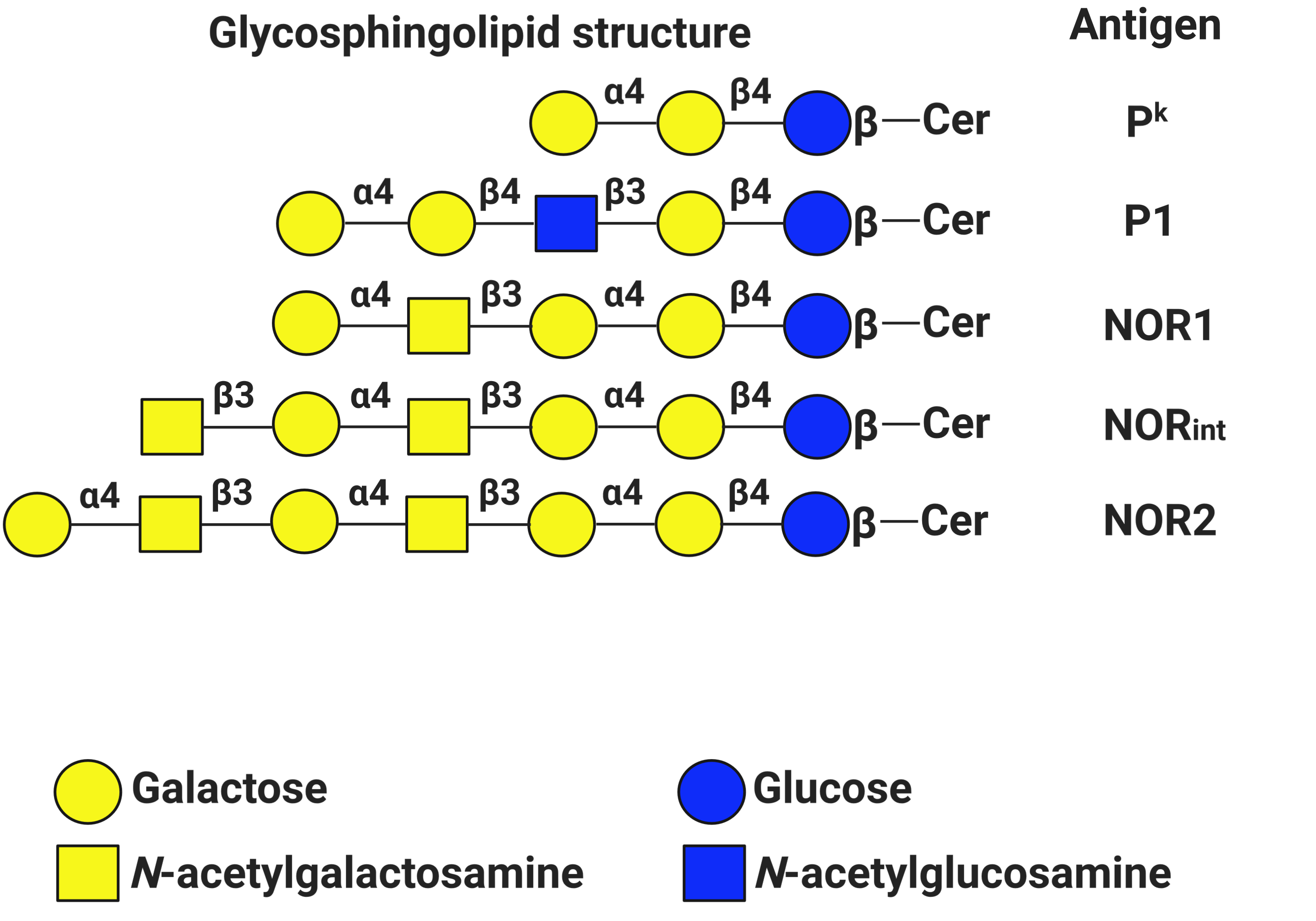
Structures of P1PK blood group antigens

P1PK (formerly: P) is a human blood group system (International Society of Blood Transfusion system 003) based upon the A4GALT gene on chromosome 22. The P antigen (later renamed P1) was first described by Karl Landsteiner and Philip Levine in 1927. The P1PK blood group system consists of three glycosphingolipid antigens: P^{k}, P1 and NOR. In addition to glycosphingolipids, terminal Galα1→4Galβ structures are present on complex-type N-glycans. The GLOB antigen (formerly P) is now the member of the separate GLOB (globoside) blood group system.

== P1PK antigens ==
The P1PK antigens are carbohydrate antigens that include P^{k} (Gb3), P1 and NOR1, NOR_{int} and NOR2. All are synthesized by Gb3/CD77 synthase (α1,4-galactosyltransferase, P1/P^{k} synthase).

- P^{k} antigen is a receptor for Shiga toxins produced by Shigella dysenteriae and some strains of Escherichia coli, which may cause hemolytic uremic syndrome (HUS). It is also a receptor for Streptococcus suis (zoonotic bacterium which can cause bacterial meningitis).
- P1, P, P^{k} and LKE antigens all serve as receptors for P-fimbriated uropathogenic E. coli (cause of chronic urinary tract infections).

The presence or absence of P1 antigen depends on the A4GALT transcript level. It was found that differential binding of transcription factors early growth response 1 (EGR1) and runt-related transcription factor 1 (RUNX1) to the SNP rs5751348 genomic region with the different genotypes in the A4GALT gene leads to differential activation of A4GALT expression, leading to two genotypes: P^{1} and P^{2}.

== P1PK phenotypes ==
P1PK phenotypes are defined by reactivity to antibodies to anti-P_{1}, anti-P, anti-P^{k} anti-PP_{1}P^{k}. and anti-NOR antibodies.

- P_{1} Phenotype: anti-P_{1} (+), anti-P (+) and anti-PP_{1}P^{k} (+) and anti-P^{k} (-).Found in 95% of Blacks and 80% of Caucasians and 30% in Japanese.
- P_{2} Phenotype: anti-P_{1} (-), anti-P (+), antiPP_{1}P^{k} (+), and anti-P^{k} (-). Found in 5% of Blacks and 20% of Whites.
- Rare p phenotype (absence of P1PK antigens caused by null mutations in A4GALT): anti-P_{1} (-), anti-P (-), anti-PP_{1}P^{k} (-), and anti-P^{k} (-). These individuals have a very strong anti-PP_{1}P^{k} which can be associated with delayed hemolytic transfusion reactions and early spontaneous abortions or hemolytic disease of the fetus and newborn (HDFN). Currently, 34 alterations, in 37 alleles, in the A4GALT gene have been found to abolish the enzyme activity, giving rise to the rare p phenotype.
- The rare NOR phenotype is caused by the presence of unique NOR1 and NOR2 glycosphingolipid antigens, terminating with Galα1 → 4GalNAcβ1. Such structure, found only in Rana ridibunda, is a result of mutation in the A4GALT gene, leading to p.Q211E substitution in Gb3/CD77 synthase (rs397514502).

== P1PK antibodies ==
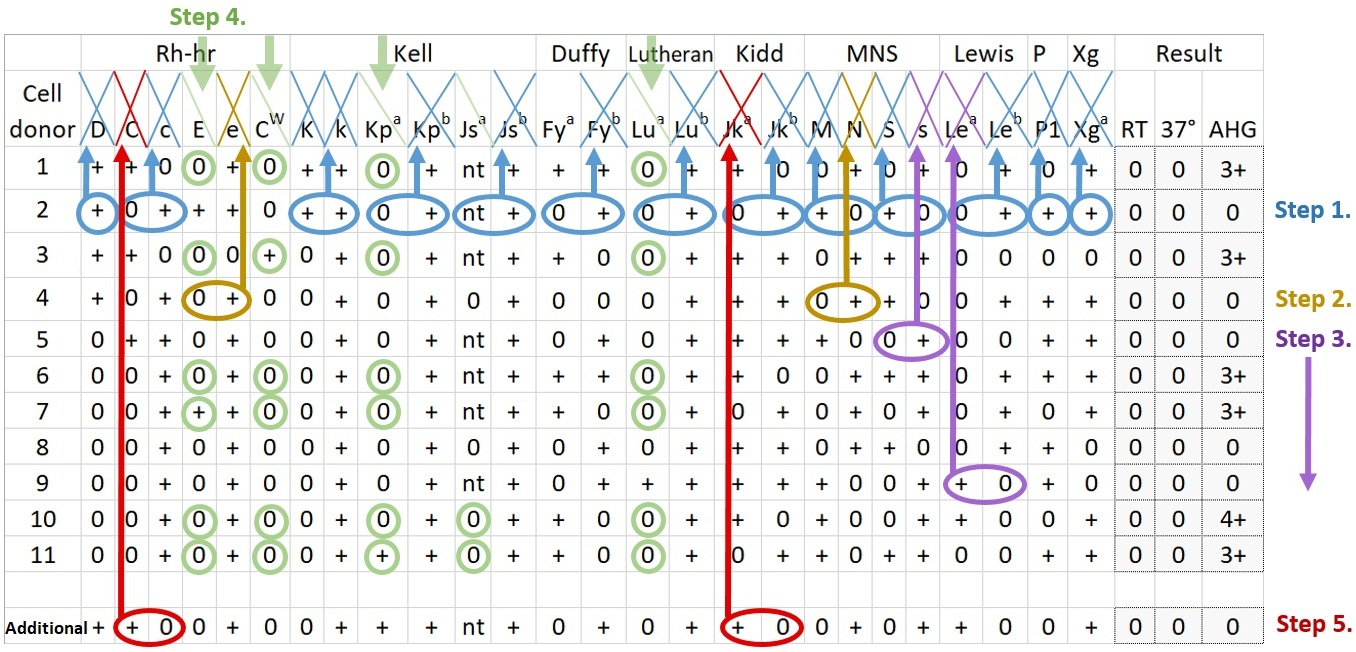
Interpretation of antibody panel to detect patient antibodies towards the most relevant human blood group systems, including P1P^{k}.

- Anti-P1 antibodies are present in up to two-thirds of P_{2} individuals, and are usually clinically insignificant. When performing blood transfusion to an anti-P1 positive patient, only rare hemolytic transfusion reactions have been reported. Anti-P1 titers are often elevated in patients with liver flukes (fascioliasis), hydatid cyst disease and who are frequently exposed to birds (which may have P1-like substances in their excrement).
- Anti-P1P^{k} is composed of a mixture of anti-GLOB, anti-P1 and antiP^{k} in the serum of p individuals. Alloanti-GLOB is seen in the sera of P_{1}^{k} and P_{2}^{k} persons and is naturally occurring and predominantly IgM isotype (but may also be a mixture of IgM and IgG). The antibodies are capable of causing hemolytic transfusion reactions and hemolytic disease of the fetus and newborn (if IgG isotype and therefore capable of crossing the placenta). There is a relationship between anti-PP1P^{k} and early spontaneous abortion (the placenta is rich in P^{k} and GLOB antigens which are targeted by IgG isotype antibodies).
- Anti-NOR antibodies occur naturally in most individuals. They react with NOR1 and NOR2 antigens, causing a phenomenon called NOR polyagglutination.

=== Antibody detection ===
Anti-P1P^{k} antibodies are not usually detected with routine laboratory methods. It is possible to detect them using the Donath-Landsteiner test. This test is performed on 2 vials of blood at two different temperatures: 4 °C and 37 °C (body temperature). A test is interpreted as positive only after a patient's red blood cells have been incubated at both temperatures and subsequently hemolyzed.

== Clinical diagnostic ==
Clinical testing in patient care for P1PK antigens follows published minimum quality and operational requirements, similar to red cell genotyping for any of the other recognized blood group systems. Molecular analysis can identify gene variants (alleles) that may affect P1PK antigens expression on the red cell membrane.
