= Er blood group system =

Human blood group classification

The Er blood group system consists of five human red blood cell surface antigens, Er^{a}, Er^{b}, Er3, Er4 and Er5. The incidences of Er^{a} and Er3 are each greater than 99% of the human population, while the incidence of Er^{b} is less than 0.01%. Er4 and Er5 are found at a high frequency in the general population.

Individuals with antibodies against Er3 may develop acute hemolytic transfusion reaction upon transfusion with an incompatible unit, while Er^{a} and Er^{b} are unlikely to be clinically significant. The clinical significance of antibodies against Er4 and Er5 is poorly understood due to a lack of data, but two cases of severe hemolytic disease of the fetus and newborn have been reported in women with these antibodies. Expression of the Er blood group antigens is controlled by the gene PIEZO1.

Er^{a} was first identified in 1982 and Er^{b} was identified in 1988. Er was recognized as a blood group collection by the International Society of Blood Transfusion in 1990 and promoted to a blood group in 2022.

== Clinical diagnostic ==
Clinical testing in patient care for Er antigens follows published minimum quality and operational requirements, similar to red cell genotyping for any of the other recognized blood group systems. Molecular analysis can identify gene variants (alleles) that may affect Er antigens expression on the red cell membrane.

== See also ==
- Human blood group systems
