= Human red cell antigens =

Blood antigen system

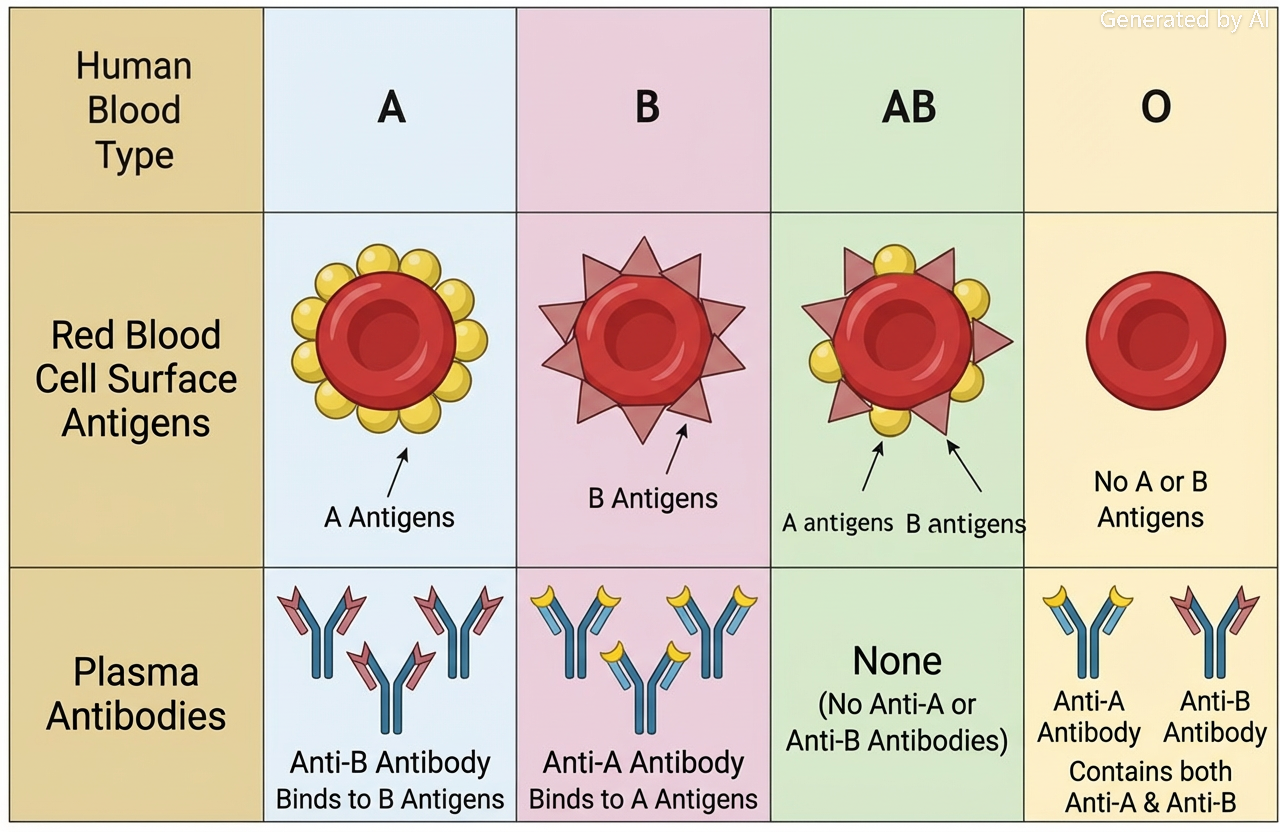

In addition to the defined human blood group systems, there are erythrocyte antigens which do not meet the definition of a blood group system. Most of these are either nearly universal in human blood or extremely rare and are rarely significant in a clinical setting. Reagents to test for these antigens are difficult to find and many cannot be purchased commercially.

== Blood group collections ==
These three groups are antigens with shared characteristics but do not meet the International Society of Blood Transfusion (ISBT) definition of a human blood group system. Further research may identify them as blood group systems.

This antibody is associated with WBC. It is associated more with tissue antibodies than red blood cells. It has not been associated with autoimmune hemolytic anemia of the fetus. However, it does cause difficulty in the blood bank because it makes it more difficult to cross match blood for transfusions.

=== Cost ===
The Knops blood group system was formerly part of this collection. All that remains are the Cs^{a} and Cs^{b} antigens. Cs^{a} is a very high frequency (>98%) antigen and Cs^{b} is not uncommon (~34%).

=== Er ===
The Er collection includes one high incidence (>99%) antigen, Er^{a} and one (<1%) rare antigen, Er^{b}.

=== Vel ===
The Vel collection includes the high incidence Vel and ABTI antigens. Antibodies to Vel have been implicated in transfusion reactions.

== Other high-incidence antigens ==
These antigens are almost universally present on human red cells, but their absence has been noted in some individuals and some have been associated with transfusion reactions or other problems. Finding compatible units for transfusion to a patient that lacks one of these antigens is a major challenge and some countries maintain rare donor registries specifically for that purpose.

- AnWj Antigen: the receptor for Haemophilus influenzae. Implicated in severe hemolytic transfusion reactions.

== Other low incidence antigens ==
These antigens are extremely rare and are of little concern in selecting compatible units for transfusion. They may be implicated in rare cases of hemolytic disease of the newborn, however.

- Batty (By)
- Biles (Bi)
- Box (Bx^{a})
- Christiansen (Chr^{a})
- HJK
- HOFM
- JFV
- JONES
- Jensen (Je^{a})
- Katagiri (Kg)
- Livesay (Li^{a})
- Milne
- Oldeide (Ol^{a})
- Peters (Pt^{a})
- Rasmussen (RASM)
- Reid (Re^{a})
- REIT
- SARA
- Torkildsen (To^{a})
- Bg (Bennett-Goodspeed): These are actually Human Leukocyte Antigens that cause confusing results on serological tests of erythrocytes.
