= Vel blood group =

Human blood group system

Small integral membrane protein 1 (Vel blood group antigen)

Identifiers
- Symbol: SMIM1
- HGNC: 44204
- OMIM: 615242
- RefSeq: 388588
- UniProt: B2RUZ4

Other data
- Locus: Chr. 1 p36.32
Search for
- Structures: Swiss-model
- Domains: InterPro

The Vel blood group is a human blood group that has been implicated in hemolytic transfusion reactions. The blood group consists of a single antigen, the high-frequency Vel antigen, which is expressed on the surface of red blood cells. Individuals are typed as Vel-positive or Vel-negative depending on the presence of this antigen. The expression of the antigen in Vel-positive individuals is highly variable and can range from strong to weak. Individuals with the rare Vel-negative blood type develop anti-Vel antibodies when exposed to Vel-positive blood, which can cause transfusion reactions on subsequent exposures.

== Genetics ==
Autosomal recessive inheritance

The Vel blood group is associated with the SMIM1 gene, which is located in the 1p36 region of chromosome 1. This gene produces small integral membrane protein 1, a single-pass transmembrane protein which carries the Vel antigen but whose structure and function are otherwise poorly understood. The Vel-negative phenotype is inherited in an autosomal recessive manner, being expressed by patients who are homozygous for a deletion mutation in the coding region of SMIM1 which renders the gene nonfunctional. Patients who are heterozygous for this mutation, meaning inherited from only one parent, exhibit weakened Vel antigen expression. Missense mutations at nucleotide position 152 can also result in a weak Vel phenotype, and various single nucleotide polymorphisms in the noncoding regions of SMIM1 affect the strength of Vel antigen expression.

== Epidemiology ==
The Vel-negative blood type is rare. The highest prevalence of Vel-negative blood has been reported in Sweden, where approximately 1 in 1200 individuals exhibit this phenotype. Only about 1 in 3000 English people and 1 in 4000 Southern Europeans are Vel-negative, and much lower rates have been reported in people of African and Asian heritage.

== Clinical significance ==
Patients with anti-Vel antibodies require rare Vel-negative donor blood, or may self-donate before elective surgery that calls for a blood transfusion.

When exposed to Vel-positive blood through transfusion or pregnancy, Vel-negative individuals can become sensitized and begin producing an anti-Vel antibody. If they are exposed to Vel-positive blood again, the anti-Vel antibody can bind to Vel-positive red blood cells and destroy them, causing hemolysis. Anti-Vel is a particularly dangerous antibody because it is able to activate the complement system, which causes immediate and severe destruction of red blood cells. Therefore, patients with anti-Vel should not be transfused with Vel-positive blood, as it can cause a serious acute hemolytic transfusion reaction. Finding compatible blood for Vel-negative patients is difficult due to the rarity of this blood type, and it may be necessary to perform autologous blood donation or to contact rare blood banks.

Cases of anti-Vel causing hemolytic disease of the newborn (HDN) have been reported, but this is an unusual occurrence. It is hypothesized that anti-Vel associated HDN is rare because the antibody is usually predominantly composed of IgM immunoglobulin, which does not cross the placenta into the fetal circulation. In addition, the expression of Vel is very weak on fetal red blood cells – particularly in children who are heterozygous for Vel.

Autoimmune hemolytic anemia (a condition in which patients produce antibodies against antigens on their own red blood cells, leading to hemolysis) involving auto-anti-Vel has been reported.

== Laboratory testing ==
An individual's Vel blood type can be determined by serologic methods, which use reagents containing anti-Vel antibodies to identify the antigen, or by genetic testing. As of 2019, serologic testing for Vel is mainly performed using polyclonal antibodies isolated from the blood of patients with anti-Vel. However, this method is problematic because these antibodies are variable in quality and sometimes produce false negative results in patients with weak Vel expression; moreover, the reagent cannot be mass-produced. In 2016, a recombinant monoclonal antibody against Vel was introduced and it has since been used to screen for Vel-negative blood donors in France. Genotyping of SMIM1 using polymerase chain reaction is another method that has been used to identify Vel-negative donors.

Anti-Vel is a mixture of IgG and IgM immunoglobulins and is able to activate complement, which can cause hemolysis in vitro (i.e. during compatibility testing). Anti-Vel can be mistaken for a typical cold antibody in compatibility testing if inappropriate techniques are used; this misidentification is dangerous, because such antibodies are usually clinically insignificant.

== Clinical diagnostic ==
Clinical testing in patient care for Vel antigen follows published minimum quality and operational requirements, similar to red cell genotyping for any of the other recognized blood group systems. Molecular analysis can identify gene variants (alleles) that may affect Vel antigen expression on the red cell membrane.

== History ==
The Vel blood group was first described in 1952 by Sussman and Miller, who reported a case of a patient who had suffered a severe hemolytic reaction following a blood transfusion. The patient's serum was subsequently crossmatched against blood samples from 10,000 donors, and only five of them were found to be compatible, indicating that an antibody against a high-frequency antigen was present. This antigen was named Vel after the first patient. The authors also observed variable expression of the antigen: the patient's serum reacted less strongly with the blood of her children, who were presumably heterozygous for Vel, than with blood from unrelated donors.

In 1955, a further case was described in which the blood of a woman who had suffered a transfusion reaction was incompatible with more than 1,000 donors, but not with the blood of the first Vel-negative patient. This patient's antibody was the first example of an anti-Vel that could hemolyze red blood cells in vitro. Six other individuals from three generations of this woman's family were found to be Vel-negative, but they did not exhibit an anti-Vel antibody, demonstrating that anti-Vel is not naturally occurring. By 1962, 19 cases of anti-Vel and approximately 50 cases of Vel-negative patients had been described.

Although the Vel blood group has been widely studied due to its significance in transfusion medicine, its genetic and molecular basis remained unclear for several decades. In 2013, two research groups simultaneously identified the SMIM1 gene and its protein product as the determinants of the Vel blood group. The Vel blood group was officially recognized by the International Society of Blood Transfusion in 2016.
