= Lan blood group system =

Human blood group system

ABCB6 (Lan blood group antigen; LAN1)

Identifiers
- Symbol: ABCB6
- NCBI gene: 10058
- HGNC: 47
- OMIM: 111600
- UniProt: Q9NP58

Other data
- Locus: Chr. 2 q36
Search for
- Structures: Swiss-model
- Domains: InterPro

The Lan blood group system (short for Langereis) is a human blood group defined by the presence or absence of the Lan antigen on a person's red blood cells. More than 99.9% of people are positive for the Lan antigen. Individuals with the rare Lan-negative blood type, which is a recessive trait, can produce an anti-Lan antibody when exposed to Lan-positive blood. Anti-Lan antibodies may cause transfusion reactions on subsequent exposures to Lan-positive blood, and have also been implicated in mild cases of hemolytic disease of the newborn. However, the clinical significance of the antibody is variable. The antigen was first described in 1961, and Lan was officially designated a blood group in 2012.

== Molecular biology ==
Autosomal recessive inheritance

The Lan antigen is carried on the protein ABCB6, an ATP-binding cassette transporter encoded by the ABCB6 gene on chromosome 2q36. The Lan-negative blood type is inherited in an autosomal recessive manner, being expressed by individuals who are homozygous for nonfunctional alleles of ABCB6. Some variant alleles cause a weak positive phenotype, which may be mistaken for a Lan-negative phenotype in serologic testing. As of 2018, more than 40 null or weak alleles of ABCB6 have been described.

ABCB6 is involved in heme synthesis and porphyrin transport and is widely expressed throughout the body, particularly in the heart, skeletal muscle, eye, fetal liver, mitochondrial membrane, and Golgi bodies. The Lan antigen is more strongly expressed on cord blood cells than on adult red blood cells. Despite the protein's wide distribution, Lan-negative individuals do not appear to experience any adverse effects from the absence of ABCB6. It is thought that other porphyrin transporters, such as ABCG2 (which carries the Junior blood group antigen), may compensate. A 2018 study found that Lan-negative blood cells exhibited resistance to Plasmodium falciparum in vitro.

== Epidemiology ==
The prevalence of the Lan antigen exceeds 99.9% in most populations. The frequency of the Lan-negative blood type is estimated at 1 in 50,000 in Japanese populations, 1 in 20,000 in Caucasians, and 1 in 1,500 in black people from South Africa.

== Clinical significance ==
When Lan-negative individuals are exposed to Lan-positive blood through transfusion or pregnancy, they may develop an anti-Lan antibody. Anti-Lan is considered a clinically significant antibody, but its effects are variable. It has been associated with severe transfusion reactions and mild cases of hemolytic disease of the newborn, but in some cases individuals with the antibody have not experienced any adverse effects from exposure to Lan-positive blood. It is recommended that individuals with anti-Lan are transfused with Lan-negative blood, especially if the antibody titer is high. One case of autoimmune hemolytic anemia involving auto-anti-Lan has been described.

== Clinical diagnostic ==
Clinical testing in patient care for Lan antigen follows published minimum quality and operational requirements, similar to red cell genotyping for any of the other recognized blood group systems. Molecular analysis can identify gene variants (alleles) that may affect Lan antigen expression on the red cell membrane.

== Laboratory testing ==
Serologic reagents and molecular assays for Lan antigen typing were not commercially available as of 2013.

Anti-Lan antibodies are typically composed of immunoglobulin G and may bind complement. As an IgG antibody, anti-Lan can be detected using the indirect antiglobulin test. The antibody is resistant to treatment with ficin, papain, trypsin, DTT, and EDTA/glycine-acid.

== History ==
The Lan antigen was first described in 1961 by Van der Hart et al., when a Dutch patient suffered a severe hemolytic transfusion reaction. The patient was found to produce an antibody that reacted with all but 1 out of 4,000 blood donors tested. The causative antigen was identified and designated "Langereis" after the patient's last name. Lan was officially designated a blood group by the International Society of Blood Transfusion in 2012, following the discovery of the molecular basis of the Lan-negative phenotype.
