= Diego antigen system =

Human blood group system

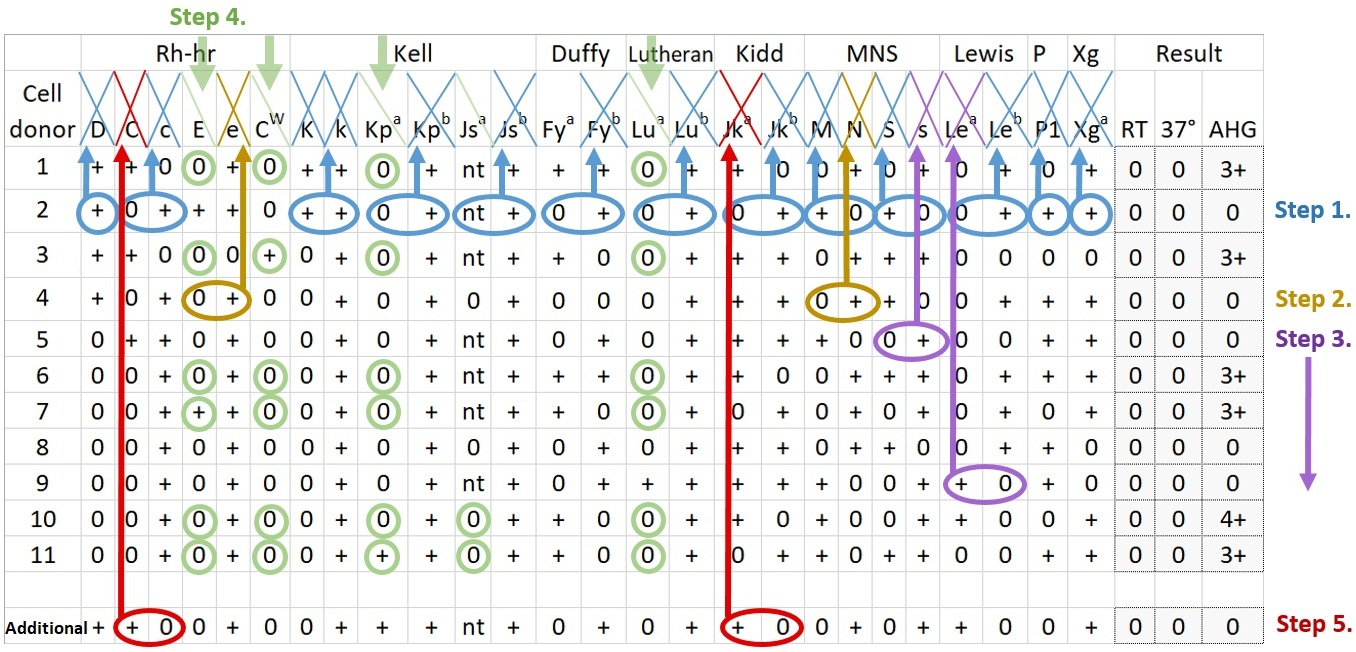
Interpretation of antibody panel to detect patient antibodies towards the most relevant human blood group systems.

The Diego antigen system (or Diego blood group system) is a human blood group system composed of 21 blood factors (or antigens) carried on the band 3 glycoprotein, also known as Anion Exchanger 1 (AE1). The antigens are inherited through various alleles of the gene SLC4A1 (Solute carrier family 4), located on human chromosome 17. The AE1 glycoprotein is expressed only in red blood cells and, in a shortened form, in some cells in the kidney. The Diego^{a} antigen is fairly common in Indigenous peoples of the Americas (in both North and South America) and East Asians, but very rare or absent in most other populations, supporting the theory that the two groups share common ancestry.

== Types ==
The Diego system is named after a pair of types, Diego^{a} (Di^{a}) and Diego^{b} (Di^{b}), which differ by one amino acid in the AE1 glycoprotein, corresponding to one difference in the nucleotide sequence of the SLC4A1 gene. Di^{b} is common or ubiquitous in all populations which have been screened for it, while Di^{a} has been found only in Indigenous peoples of the Americas (in both North and South America) and East Asians, and in people with some ancestors from those groups. People heterozygous for the two alleles produce both antigens. No individual has been tested who does not produce one, or both, of the two antigens. Anti-Di^{a} (the antibody to Di^{a}) can cause severe hemolytic disease of the newborn and severe transfusion reaction. Anti-Di^{b} usually causes milder reactions.

The Wright blood system is another pair of types, Wright^{a} (Wr^{a}) and Wright^{b} (Wr^{b}), also differing by one amino acid on the AE1 glycoprotein and one nucleotide on the SLC4A1 gene. Wr^{a} always expresses antigens, but the antibody reaction of Wr^{b} depends on a variation in the structure of glycophorin A, which binds with Wr^{b}. Anti-Wr^{a} can also cause severe hemolytic disease of the newborn and severe transfusion reaction. Anti-Wr^{b} is very rare, and little data is available on its severity.

Seventeen other rare blood types (as of 2002) are included in the Diego antigen system, as they are produced by mutations on the SLC4A1 gene. These include the Waldner (Wd^{a}), Redelberger (Rb^{a}), Warrior (WARR), ELO, Wulfsberg (Wu), Bishop (Bp^{a}), Moen (Mo^{a}), Hughes (Hu^{a}), van Vugt (Vg^{a}), Swann (Sw^{a}), Bowyer (BOW), NFLD, Nunhart (Jn^{a}), KREP, Traversu (Tr^{a}), Froese (Fra) and SW1 types.

=== List of Diego antigens ===
List of Diego antigens
ISBT	Symbol	Historical name	Substitution
DI1	Di^{a}	Diego a	Leu 854
DI2	Di^{b}	Diego b	Pro 854
DI3	Wr^{a}	Wright a	Lys 658
DI4	Wr^{b}	Wright b	Glu 658
DI5	Wd^{a}	Waldner	Val 557 Met
DI6	Rb^{a}	Radelberger	Pro 548 Met
DI7	WARR	Warrior	Thr 552 Ile
DI8	ELO		Arg 432 Trp
DI9	Wu	Wulfsberg	Gly 565 Ala
DI10	Bp^{a}	Bishop	Asn 569 Lys
DI11	Mo^{a}	Moen	Arg 656 Cys
DI12	Hg^{a}	Hughes	Tyr 555 His
DI13	Ug^{a}	van Vugt	Arg 646 Gln
DI14	Sw^{a}	Swann	Pro 561 Ser
DI15	BOW	Bowyer	Pro 561 Ser
DI16	NFLD		Glu 429 Asp; Pro 561 Ala
DI17	Jn^{a}	Nunhart	Pro 566 Ser
DI18	KREP		Pro 566 Ala
DI19	Tra	Traversu	Lys 551 Asn
DI20	Fra	Froese	Glu 480 Lys
DI21	SW1		Arg 646 Trp
DI22	DISK		Gly 565 Ala

== History ==
The first Diego antigen, Di^{a}, was discovered in 1953, when a child in Venezuela died of hemolytic disease three days after birth. Rh and ABO blood type mismatches were soon ruled out, and investigators began searching for a rare blood factor. Red blood cells from the father reacted strongly to blood serum from the mother. Rare blood types known at the time were eliminated, and the new type was classified as a "private" or "family" blood type. The investigators, with the agreement of the father, named the new type after his surname, "Diego". In 1955 investigators found that the Diego family included ancestry from Indigenous peoples of the Americas, and that the Diego factor (Di^{a}) was not restricted to the Diego family, but occurred in several populations in Venezuela and elsewhere in South America. Investigators suspected that the Diego factor might be a Mongoloid trait, and tested groups of Native Americans in the United States and people of Chinese and Japanese ancestry, and found Di^{a} in those groups. Anti-Di^{b} was found in 1967, establishing the Diego group as a two-antigen system. In 1993 the Diego pair of antigens was found to result from a single point mutation (nucleotide 2561) on what is now called the SLC4A1 gene on chromosome 17.

The Wright^{a} antigen (Wr^{a}), a very low frequency blood type, was also discovered in 1953. The Wright^{b} antigen (Wr^{b}), a very high frequency blood type, was discovered about a decade later, but the two types were not recognized as a pair for another 20 years. The Wright group was eventually identified as a single point mutation on the SLC4A1 gene. The Wright group was subsumed into the Diego group in 1995, since its location on the SLC4A1 gene had been determined after the Diego group had been located there.

Starting in 1995, various rare antigen types, some of which had been known for 30 years, were found to also be caused by mutations on the SLC4A1 gene, and were therefore added to the Diego system.

== Distribution of the Diego^{a} antigen ==
The Di^{b} antigen has been found in all populations tested. The Di^{a} antigen, however, has been found only in populations of indigenous peoples of the Americas and East Asians, and people with some ancestry in those populations. Some groups in South America have a relatively high frequency of Di^{a}+. A sample of the Kaingang people of Brazil was 49% Di^{a}+. Samples of other groups in Brazil and Venezuela were 14% to 36% Di^{a}+.

While the Di^{a} antigen is found at moderate to high frequencies in most populations of indigenous peoples in South America, it is absent in the Waica people, and occurs at very low frequencies in the Warao and Yaruro people of interior northern South America. Layrisse and Wilbert, who characterize these people as "Marginal Indians", proposed that they are remnants of a first migration into South America of people who had not acquired the allele for the Di^{a} antigen, with other indigenous peoples of South America resulting from a later migration.

Samples of groups in Guatemala and Mexico have 20% to 22% Di^{a}+. Samples from Native American groups in the United States and First Nations groups in Canada have 4% to 11% Di^{a}+. Although the incidence of Diego^{a}+ is relatively high in Siberian Eskimos and Aleut people (the incidence of Diego^{a}+ in Aleuts is comparable to South American levels), it occurs at a much lower frequency (less than 0.5%) among Alaskan Eskimos and has not been found in the Inuit of Canada.

The Di^{a} antigen is widespread in East Asian populations. Samples of East Asian populations show 4% Di^{a}+ for the Ainu of Hokkaido, 2% to 10% Di^{a}+ for Japanese, 6% to 15% Di^{a}+ for Koreans, 7% to 13% Di^{a}+ for Mongolians, 10% Di^{a}+ for northern Chinese and 3% to 5% Di^{a}+ for southern Chinese.

The Di^{a} antigen is also found in northern India and in Malaysia, where there are populations of East Asian ancestry. North Indians (of unspecified ethnicity) are reported to be 4% Di^{a}+. On the other hand, a sample of Indian students attending the University of Michigan, the majority of which were Gujarati, found none to be Di^{a}+. A survey of residents of the Klang Valley in Malaysia found the incidence of Di^{a}+ in ethnic Chinese to be 4%, in ethnic Malays to be a little over 1%, and in ethnic Indians (descended from southern Indians) to be a little under 1%. (A smaller sample of Malays in Penang, Malaysia, were 4% Di^{a}+.)

The Di^{a} antigen is very rare in African and European populations. One West African subject had an ambiguous possible reaction to Di^{a}. About 0.5% of Europeans of Polish ancestry have been found to be Di^{a}+. This incidence has been attributed to gene mixture from Tatars who invaded Poland five to seven centuries ago. Diego Antigen has been found in 0.89% of Germans from Berlin. The Di^{a} antigen is very rare or absent in Aboriginal Australians, Papuans, natives of New Britain, and Polynesians.

The distribution of the Di^{a} antigen has been cited as proof that the Americas were populated by migrations from Siberia. Differences in the frequency of the antigen in populations of indigenous people in the Americas correlate with major language families, modified by environmental conditions. Another study suggests that the distribution of the Di^{a} antigen in central and eastern Asia has been shaped by the expansion of Mongolian and related populations that resulted in the creation of the Mongol Empire in the 13th- and 14th-centuries.

== Clinical diagnostic ==
Clinical testing in patient care for Diego antigens follows published minimum quality and operational requirements, similar to red cell genotyping for any of the other recognized blood group systems. Molecular analysis can identify gene variants (alleles) that may affect Diego antigens expression on the red cell membrane.
