= Colton antigen system =

Blood antigen system

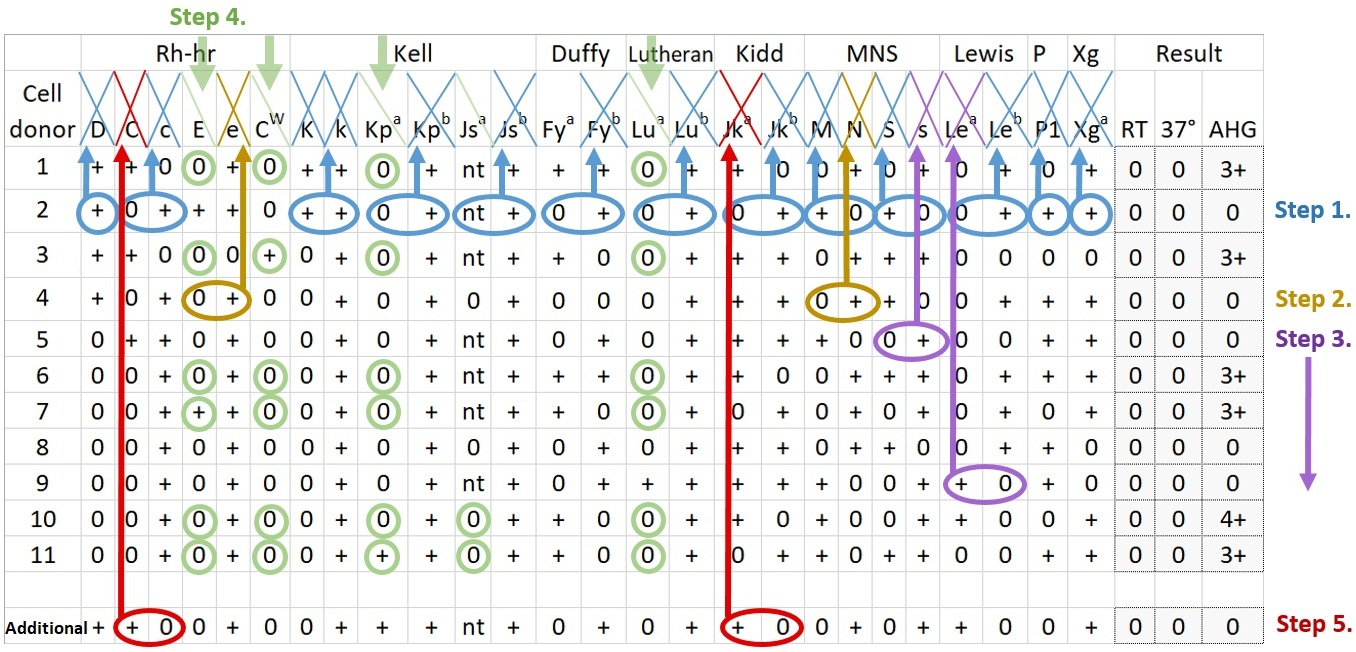
Interpretation of antibody panel to detect patient antibodies towards the most relevant human blood group systems.

The Colton antigen system (Co) is present on the membranes of red blood cells and in the tubules of the kidney and helps determine a person's blood type. The Co antigen is found on a protein called aquaporin-1 which is responsible for water homeostasis and urine concentration.

The Co antigen is important in transfusion medicine. 99.8% of people possess the Co(a) allele. Individuals with Co(b) allele or who are missing the Colton antigen are at risk for a transfusion reaction such as hemolytic anemia or alloimmunization. Antibodies against the Colton antigen may also cause hemolytic disease of the newborn, in which a pregnant person’s body creates antibodies against the blood of their fetus, leading to destruction of the fetal blood cells.

== Clinical diagnostic ==
Clinical testing in patient care for Colton antigens follows published minimum quality and operational requirements, similar to red cell genotyping for any of the other recognized blood group systems. Molecular analysis can identify gene variants (alleles) that may affect Colton antigens expression on the red cell membrane.
