= Sid blood group system =

Human blood group system

Beta-1,4 N-acetylgalactosaminyltransferase 2

Identifiers
- Symbol: B4GALNT2
- Alt. symbols: Cad, Sd(a) antigen
- NCBI gene: 124872
- HGNC: 24136
- OMIM: 111730
- RefSeq: NP_001152859.1
- UniProt: Q8NHY0

Other data
- EC number: 2.4.1.165
- Locus: Chr. 17 q21.32
Search for
- Structures: Swiss-model
- Domains: InterPro

The Sid blood group system is a human blood group defined by the presence or absence of the Sd(a) antigen (also known as Sid antigen) on a person's red blood cells. About 96% of people are positive for the Sd(a) antigen, which is inherited as a dominant trait. Among Sd(a) positive individuals, the expression of the antigen ranges from extremely weak to extremely strong. Very strong expression of the antigen is referred to as a Sd(a++) phenotype. In addition to being expressed on red blood cells, Sd(a) is secreted in bodily fluids such as saliva and breast milk, and is found in the highest concentrations in urine. Urine testing is considered the most reliable method for determining a person's Sid blood type.

Antibodies against the Sd(a) antigen are naturally occurring, meaning people produce them without having been exposed to Sd(a) positive blood through transfusion or pregnancy. These antibodies are not usually considered to be clinically significant, but there have been two cases of transfusion reactions associated with transfusion of Sd(a++) blood to people with anti-Sd(a) antibodies. Sid was officially designated a blood group in 2019 after its genetic basis was discovered.

== Molecular biology ==
The Sd(a) negative blood type is caused by missense mutations in B4GALNT2, a gene located on chromosome 17q21.32 which encodes a glycosyltransferase that catalyzes the final step in the synthesis of the Sd(a) antigen. The Sd(a) antigen exhibits autosomal dominant inheritance. The antigen is not only expressed on the surface of red blood cells but is found in soluble form in human plasma, breast milk, saliva and meconium, and is present in very high quantities in the urine, where it is carried on Tamm-Horsfall glycoprotein. It is also expressed in the stomach, colon, kidneys, and lymph nodes. Newborns do not express Sd(a) on their red cells until about 10 weeks after birth (although they do express the antigen in their bodily fluids), and expression of Sd(a) antigen on red blood cells often decreases during pregnancy.

== Clinical significance ==
The expression of Sd(a) antigen in positive individuals is highly variable, and ranges from expression so weak that it is barely detectable, to expression so strong that the cells are agglutinated by plasma from most human donors (polyagglutination). Extremely strong expression of Sd(a) is denoted as Sd(a++).

The Sd(a++) phenotype is sometimes referred to as the Cad phenotype, after a 1968 paper that identified a novel antigen in members of the Cad family from Mauritius. The Cad positive cells showed polyagglutination and reacted with Dolichos biflorus lectin, a reagent used to identify type A_{1} red blood cells, even though the cells were type B or O. Later research showed that strong examples of Sd(a) also exhibited polyagglutination and reaction with Dolichos biflorus, and that Cad was likely an exceptionally strong Sd(a) positive phenotype. It is believed that Sd(a) and Cad share the same antigenic determinant and are likely synthesized by the same enzyme, but there may be structural and quantitative differences in the expression of the two substances. The Cad/Sd(a++) phenotype, like the Sd(a) positive phenotype, shows autosomal dominant inheritance.

Anti-Sd(a) is a naturally occurring antibody, meaning Sd(a) negative individuals produce it without having been exposed to Sd(a) positive blood through transfusion or pregnancy. Anti-Sd(a) is not typically considered to pose a hazard in blood transfusion, but as of 2018, two cases of transfusion reactions following the transfusion of Sd(a++) blood have been documented. It is suggested that people with anti-Sd(a) are transfused with "least incompatible" blood (the blood unit that gives the weakest reactions during crossmatching) to avoid potential exposure to Sd(a++) units. Anti-Sd(a) is not known to cause hemolytic disease of the newborn.

== Epidemiology ==
Approximately 91% of people test positive for Sd(a) through blood typing, and 96% test positive through urine testing. The Sd(a++) phenotype is rare, especially in Europe, but may be more common in East Asian populations.

== Laboratory testing ==
Urine is considered the optimal specimen for Sd(a) phenotyping. The Sd(a) antigen can be detected in urine using hemagglutination inhibition testing: anti-Sd(a) is added to the urine, followed by Sd(a) positive blood cells. If Sd(a) is present in the urine, it will bind the antibody and prevent the red blood cells from agglutinating.

Anti-Sd(a) is usually composed of immunoglobulin M and is reactive at room temperature, but it also displays reactivity in the indirect antiglobulin test. The antibody displays a characteristic pattern of mixed-field agglutination during testing. Under the microscope, small, shiny clumps of red blood cells are visible, surrounded by unagglutinated cells. The reactivity of anti-Sd(a) is enhanced by enzyme treatment with ficin, papain, and trypsin, and the antibody is resistant to treatment with dithiothreitol. Guinea pig urine contains very high concentrations of Sd(a) antigen and is sometimes used to identify anti-Sd(a) antibodies by inhibition testing.

== Clinical diagnostic ==
Clinical testing in patient care for Sid antigen follows published minimum quality and operational requirements, similar to red cell genotyping for any of the other recognized blood group systems. Molecular analysis can identify gene variants (alleles) that may affect Sid antigen expression on the red cell membrane.

== History ==
The antigen was named for Sid, an employee at the Lister Institute whose red blood cells were used for antibody screening. They were found to react strongly with samples containing an unidentified antibody, which was later characterized as anti-Sd(a). Although the Sd(a) antigen was named in 1967, and had been studied since at least 10 years earlier, it was only connected to B4GALNT2 in 2003 and assigned to a blood group in 2019 following the discovery of the molecular basis of the Sd(a) negative phenotype. It had previously been classified as part of the ISBT 901 series of high-incidence antigens.
