= Kidd antigen system =

Human blood group classification

The Kidd antigen system (also known as Jk antigen) are proteins found in the Kidd's blood group, which act as antigens, i.e., they have the ability to produce antibodies under certain circumstances. The Jk antigen is found on a protein responsible for urea transport in the red blood cells and the kidney. They are important in transfusion medicine. People with two Jk(a) antigens, for instance, may form antibodies against donated blood containing two Jk(b) antigens (and thus no Jk(a) antigens). This can lead to hemolytic anemia, in which the body destroys the transfused blood, leading to low red blood cell counts. Another disease associated with the Jk antigen is hemolytic disease of the newborn, in which a pregnant woman's body creates antibodies against the blood of her fetus, leading to destruction of the fetal blood cells. Hemolytic disease of the newborn associated with Jk antibodies is typically mild, though fatal cases have been reported.

The gene encoding this protein is found on chromosome 18. Three Jk alleles are Jk (a), Jk (b), and Jk3. Jk (a) was discovered by Allen et al. in 1951 and is named after a patient (Mrs Kidd delivered a baby with a haemolytic disease of the newborn associated with an antibody directed against a new antigen Jk (a), whereas Jk (b) was discovered by Plant et al. in 1953. Individuals who lack the Jk antigen (Jk null) are unable to maximally concentrate their urine.

== Genetics and biochemistry ==
Kidd comprises three antigens on a glycoprotein with 10 transmembrane spanning domains, cytoplasmic N- and C-termini and one extracellular N-glycosylation site. The Kidd gene has 11 exons with exons 4-11 encoding the mature protein. The Kidd gene (SLC14A1) is on chromosome 18q12.3.

== Clinical diagnostic ==
Clinical testing in patient care for Kidd antigens follows published minimum quality and operational requirements, similar to red cell genotyping for any of the other recognized blood group systems. Molecular analysis can identify gene variants (alleles) that may affect Kidd antigens expression on the red cell membrane.

== Kidd antigens ==
=== Jka (JK1) and Jkb (JK2) ===
Jka and Jkb are the products of alleles with Asp280 and Asn280 in the fourth external loop of the Kidd glycoprotein. Jka and Jkb have similar prevalences in White and Asian populations but Jka is more common in Black populations than Jkb.

Kidd antigens are enhanced by enzymes

=== Jk(a-b-) and Jk3 ===
Jk(a-b-) represents the null phenotype and usually results from homozygosity for a silent gene at the JK locus. The null phenotype is rare in most populations but does have increased prevalence in Polynesians (one in 400) and Niueans (1.4%).

In Polynesians the null allele contains a splice site mutation in intron 5 causing a loss of exon 6 from the mRNA product.

In Finns (null phenotype less rare than in other European populations), the null phenotype results from a mutation encoding a Ser291Pro substitution.

A rare null phenotype in Japanese individuals results from heterozygosity for an inhibitor gene. In(Jk) in analogy with the In(Lu) dominant inhibitor of Lutheran and other antigens.

Immunized individuals with the Jk(a-b-) phenotype may produce anti-Jk3.

Very weak expression of Jka and/or Jkb can be detected on In(Jk) red blood cells in adsorption/elution tests.

== Kidd antibodies and clinical significance ==
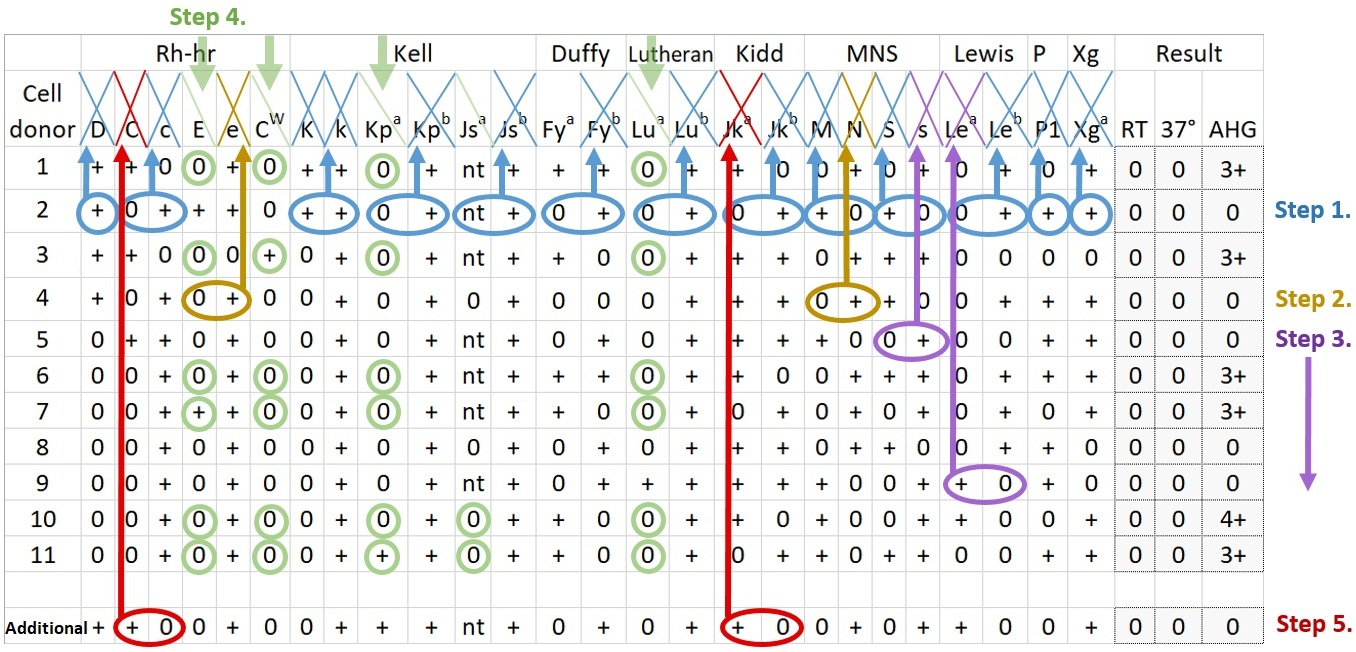
Interpretation of antibody panel to detect patient antibodies towards the most relevant human blood group systems, including Kidd.

=== Antibody subtypes and complement fixation ===
Anti-Jka and -Jkb are not common. They are usually warm-reacting IgG1 and IgG3 but may also include IgG2, IgG4 or IgM. Approximately 50% of anti-Jka and -Jkb antibodies are capable of binding complement.

=== Dosage ===
Kidd antibodies display dosage: red cells from homozygous individuals (JkaJka or Jk(a+b-)) express more antigen than heterozygous individuals (JkaJkb or Jk(a+b+)). Anti-Kidd antibodies appear to react more strongly against cells that are homozygous.

=== Laboratory detection ===
Kidd antibodies can be difficult to detect by direct agglutination testing and generally require addition of antihuman globulin after a warm incubation period.

=== Clinical significance ===
Kidd antibodies are dangerous as they are capable of causing severe acute hemolytic transfusion reactions. They are unique in that they are capable of dropping to low or even undetectable levels after several months following an exposure. Thus, on pre-transfusion testing, an anti-Jka or -Jkb may go undetected. Following transfusion, a subsequent robust antibody response in the patient can occur (anamnestic response), resulting in hemolysis of the transfused red blood cells. Kidd antibodies are often capable of binding complement and causing intravascular hemolysis. More often, however, Kidd antibodies cause acute extravascular hemolysis. They are a notorious cause of delayed hemolytic transfusion reactions, and may occur up to a week after transfusion in some instances. Kidd antibodies only rarely cause hemolytic disease of the fetus and newborn.

== Kidd glycoprotein as urea transporter ==
Kidd antigens are located on a red blood cell urea transporter (human urea transporter 11- HUT11 or UT-B1). As red blood cells approach the renal medulla (where there is a high concentration of urea), the urea transporter allows for rapid uptake of urea and prevents cell shrinkage in the hypertonic environment of the medulla. As the red cell leaves the medulla, the urea is transported back out of the cell, preventing cellular swelling and preventing the urea from being carried away from the kidney. HUT11 was detected on endothelial cells of the vasa recta (vascular supply of the renal medulla) but it is not present in renal tubules.

Due to absence of the urea transporter, Jk(a-b-) cells are not hemolyzed by 2M urea. This can be used as a screening test for Jk(a-b-) donors.

The Jk(a-b-) phenotype has no clinical defect, although two individuals with this phenotype have been reported to have mild urine-concentrating defects.

== Kidd antibodies in transplant patients ==
Kidd antibodies are capable of behaving as histocompatibility antigens in renal transplants and may be responsible for allograft rejection in some cases.
