= LOC101928193 =

Putative protein-coding gene in humans

Identifiers
- Aliases: uncharacterized LOC101928193
- External IDs: GeneCards:
Orthologs
Databases	NCBI: entry
Species	Human	Mouse
Entrez	101928193	n/a
Ensembl	n/a	n/a
UniProt	n a	n/a
RefSeq (mRNA)	XM_011519275; XM_011519276; XM_011548774	n/a
RefSeq (protein)	n/a	n/a
Location (UCSC)	n/a	n/a
PubMed search		n/a
- Wikidata
View/Edit Human

LOC101928193 is a putative protein-coding gene found in humans. Its record was withdrawn from NCBI in 2021 due to insufficient support.

Similar copies of this gene, called orthologs, are known to exist in several different species across mammals, amphibians, fish, mollusks, cnidarians, fungi, and bacteria. The human LOC101928193 gene is located on the long (q) arm of chromosome 9 with a cytogenic location at 9q34.2. The molecular location of the gene is from base pair 133,189,767 to base pair 133,192,979 on chromosome 9 for an mRNA length of 3213 nucleotides. The gene and protein are not yet well understood by the scientific community, but there is data on its genetic makeup and expression. The LOC101928193 protein is targeted for the cytoplasm and has the highest level of expression in the thyroid, ovary, skin, and testes in humans.

== Gene ==
=== Locus ===
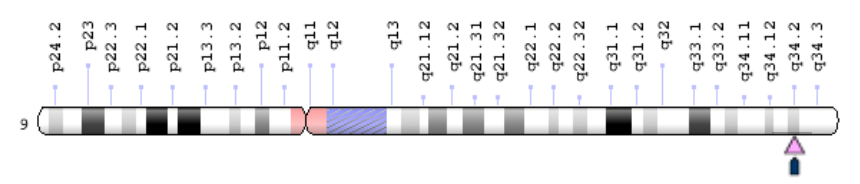
Cytogenic location of LOC101928193 at 9q34.2. The gene is on the positive strand and is located from base pairs 133,189,767 to 133,192,979.

The cytogenic location of LOC101928193 in humans is located on the positive strand at 9q34.2. The molecular location of the protein-encoding region of LOC101928193 is from base pairs 133,189,767 to 133,192,979. Within this region, there is 1 intron and 2 exons.

=== Gene neighborhood ===
LOC101928193 is flanked by GBGT1 and 0BP2B on chromosome 9. GBGT1 encodes a member of the ABO gene family and also plays a role in synthesizing glycolipids that are involved in tropism and binding pathogens. 0BP2B is a gene that associates with E-Selectin Level in the ABO gene region.

== mRNA ==
In humans, the LOC101928193 gene produces 3 transcript variants, which produce 3 isoforms of the protein. The LOC101928193 isoform X1 is the longest one at 406 codons in length. LOC101928193 isoform X2 is 388 codons long and LOC101928193 isoform X3 is 399 codons long. All isoforms have 2 exons and their coding mRNA is 3213 nucleotides long.

== Protein ==
The molecular weight of LOC101928193 is 43.5 kilodaltons. The isoelectric point is 9 pI.

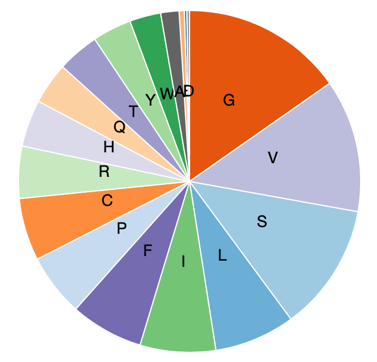
LOC101928193 amino acid composition. This is a glycine, valine, and serine rich protein. It is also methionine, asparagine, aspartic acid, glutamic acid, and lysine poor.

=== Composition ===
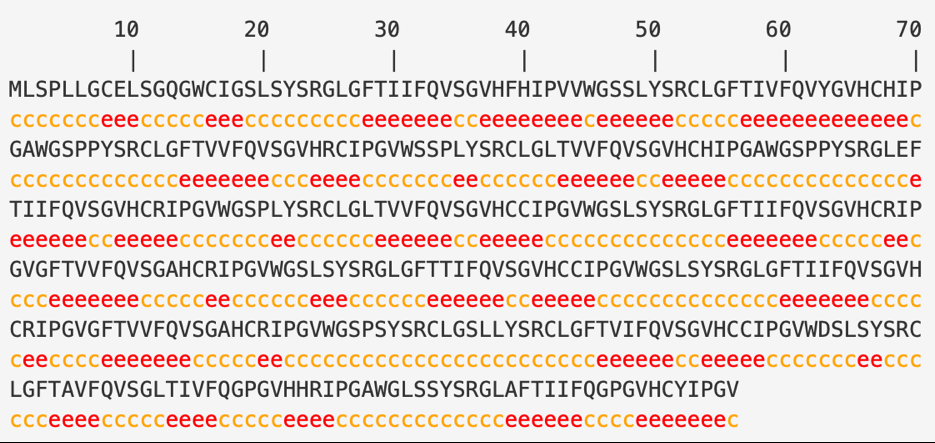
LOC101928193 predicted secondary structure. The orange c's indicate predicted coils and the red e's indicate predicted beta sheets.

Compared to most human proteins, there are more valine, glycine, serine, histidine, and phenylalanine residues in LOC101928193. LOC101928193 is an alanine, methionine, asparagine, aspartic acid, glutamic acid, and lysine poor protein. The enrichment of all other amino acids is normal compared to other human proteins. LOC101928193 composition is highly conserved between mammals.

LOC101928193 Amino Acid Enrichment
Amino acid	Enrichment level	Residues present	Properties
Valine (V)	Fully enriched	51 (12.6%)	Hydrophobic
Glycine (G)	Semi-enriched	62 (15.3%)	Polar
Serine (S)	Semi-enriched	49 (12.1%)	Polar
Histidine (H)	Semi-enriched	18 (4.4%)	Basic
Phenylalanine (F)	Semi-enriched	28 (6.9%)	Hydrophobic
Alanine (A)	Fully depleted	7 (1.7%)	Hydrophobic
Methionine (M)	Fully depleted	1 (0.2%)	Hydrophobic
Asparagine (N)	Fully depleted	0 (0%)	Polar
Aspartic acid (D)	Fully depleted	1 (0.2%)	Polar
Glutamic acid (E)	Fully depleted	2 (0.5%)	Polar
Lysine (K)	Fully depleted	0 (0%)	Polar

LOC101928193 has an amino acid charge distribution of 0.7% negative, 4.9% positive, and 94.4% neutral. There are no charge runs, hydrophobic segments, or transmembrane domains.

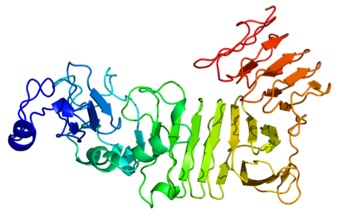
LOC101928193 predicted tertiary structure. Image coloured by rainbow N → C terminus.

=== Domains and motifs ===
There are two different motifs present in LOC101928193. Myristoylation sites are found in the protein sequence 17 times, and a zinc finger domain motif occurs once. The presence of myristoylation sites indicates that LOC101928193 may function in membrane targeting, protein-protein interactions, and signal transduction pathways. Zinc finger domain motifs aid in gene transcription, cell adhesion, protein folding, and chromatin remodeling.

=== Primary sequence ===
The LOC101928193 primary coding sequence mRNA is 3213 nucleotides long. There are no upstream open-reading frames, Kozak consensus sequences, or transmembrane regions.

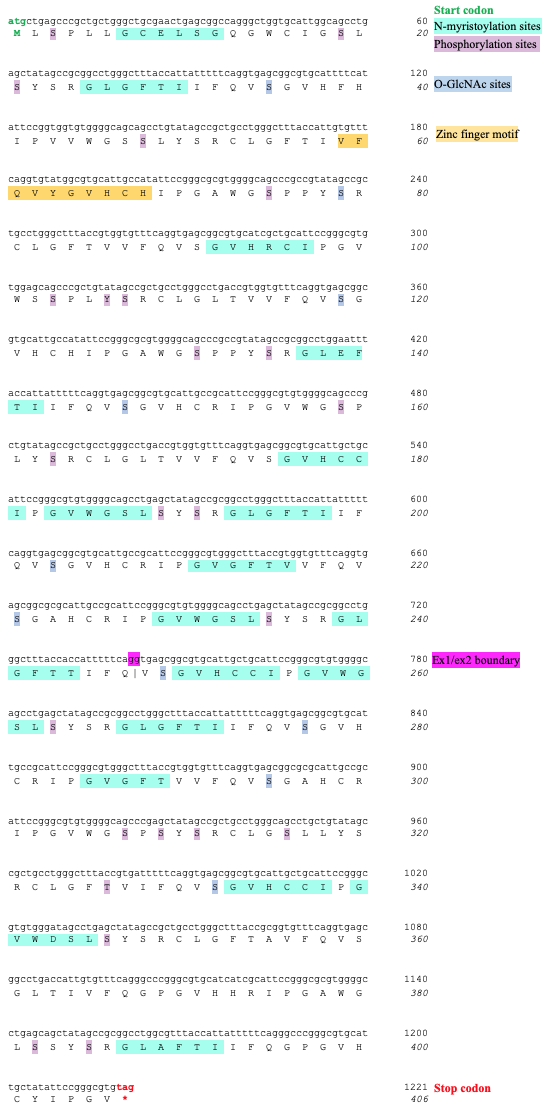
LOC101928193 conceptual translation with post-translational modifications and motifs.

=== Secondary structure ===
LOC101928193 has a predicted secondary structure of 56.40% random coils and 43.60% beta sheets. No alpha helices are predicted to occur. Due to the lack of alpha helices in the protein, no coiled coils are predicted to occur in the LOC101928193 secondary structure.

=== Tertiary structure ===
The tertiary structure of LOC101928193 is an all beta-sheet protein, as can be seen by its predicted tertiary structure. Both the N-terminus and the C-terminus lack beta-sheets.

=== Post-translational modifications ===
==== O-GlcNAc ====
There are 13 predicted O-GlcNAc sites within the LOC101928193 protein. O-GlcNAc is a unique form of protein glycosylation that occurs exclusively in the nuclear and cytoplasmic compartments of the cell. O-Glc-NAcylated proteins are abundant on proteins involved in signaling pathways, stress responses, cytoskeletal assembly, and energy metabolism.

==== N-linked glycosylation ====
There are no N-linked glycosylation sites due to the absence of asparagine residues.

==== Phosphorylation ====
LOC101928193 has many sites of phosphorylation at several serines, threonines, and tyrosines throughout its structure that results in a conformational change and aids in signaling pathways and regulation. There are 33 predicted phosphorylation sites. The relative amount of phosphorylation sites is highly conserved throughout orthologs of LOC101928193.

=== Subcellular localization ===
LOC101928193 is targeted to the cytoplasm for Homo sapiens, rodents, amphibians, fish, and mollusks. It is predicted to localize in the nucleus for cnidarians, fungi, and bacteria.

== Expression ==
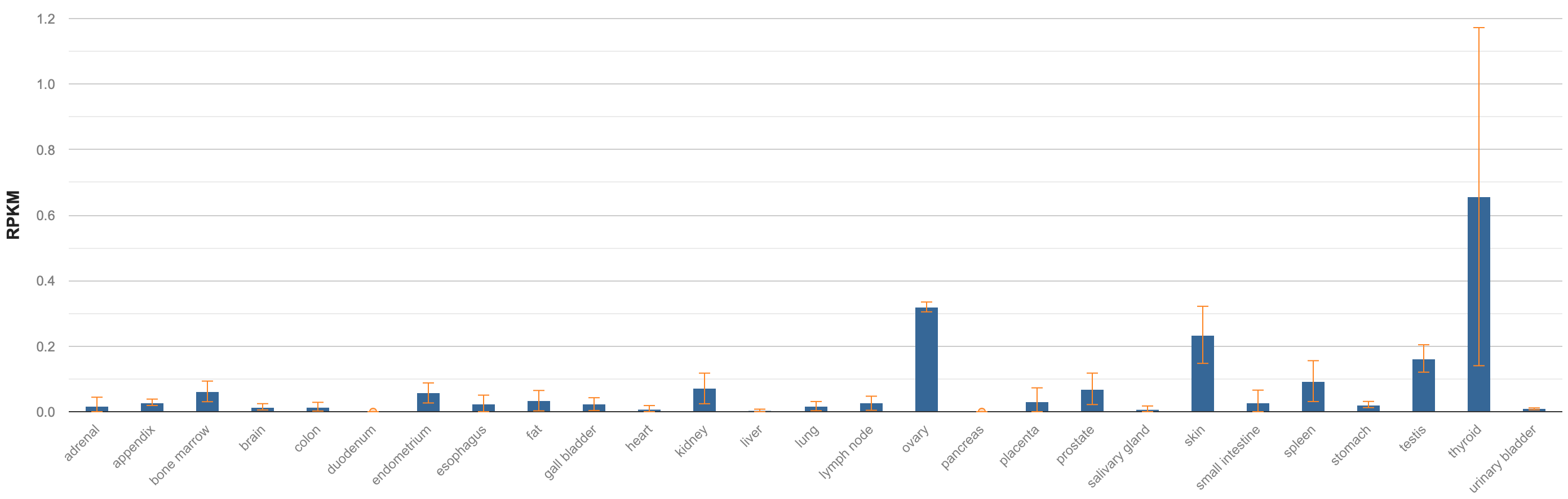
The Mean RPKM Values of 27 Different Human Tissues From RNA-Sequencing of LOC101928193. The protein is most highly expressed in the thyroid, ovaries, skin, and testes.

LOC101928193 is not expressed ubiquitously, but is instead tissue specific in low levels of mRNA abundance compared to other human proteins. LOC101928193 has the highest level of expression in the thyroid and has high levels of expression in the ovaries, skin, and testes. Additionally, the gene is expressed in 23 other tissues at levels lower than 0.1 RPKM (Reads Per Kilobase of transcript per Million mapped reads) in humans. Other studies have also found that tissue-specific circular RNA induction of LOC101928193 during human fetal development has the highest levels in the heart, kidney, and stomach at 10 weeks gestational time.

== Regulation of Expression ==
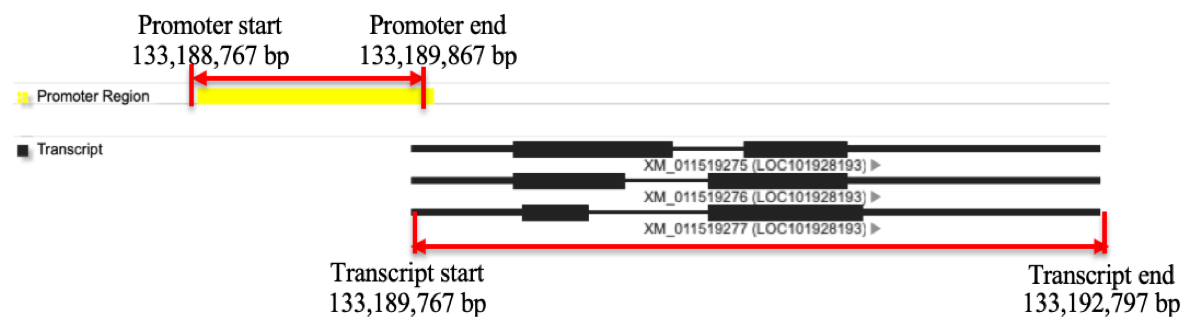
LOC101928193 promoter and isoforms. There is one promoter and three isoforms.

=== Epigenetic ===
Epigenetic processes such as DNA methylation and histone modification that control expression have not been found in LOC101928193.

=== Transcriptional ===
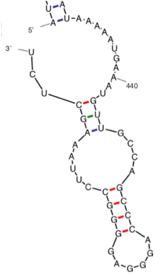
LOC101928193 5' UTR stem loops near AUG.

==== Promoter ====
There is one promoter for the LOC101928193 gene (GXP_6058323), and it is 1101 nucleotides long on the positive strand from base pairs 133,188,767 to 133,189,867 on chromosome 9. The transcription start site can be found at the 1001 base pair position.

==== Transcription factor binding sites ====
Several transcription factors are predicted to bind to the promoter sequence. Some examples include:

- X-box binding factors
- Nuclear factor kappa B/c-rel
- MAF and AP1 related factors
- Interferon regulatory factors
- RBPJ-kappa
- MEF3 binding sites
- Cart-1 homeoprotein
- Fork head domain factors

Based on the functions of these transcription factors, it is possible that LOC101928193 may have been involved in gene repression, hematopoiesis regulation, fetal development, inhibition, DNA-binding, or limb development.

=== Translational and mRNA stability ===
Under conditions consistent with the temperature in the human body, multiple stem loops are predicted to occur in the 5' UTR, the coding region of the protein, and in the 3' UTR. The stem loops direct RNA folding, protect structural stability for mRNA, provide recognition sites for RNA binding proteins, and serve as a substrate for enzymatic reactions. There is an interior loop and a stem loop in the mRNA near AUG on the 5' UTR. These structures are often bound by proteins or cause the attenuation of a transcript in order to regulate translation. Furthermore, these stem-loops aid in mRNA stability and the predicted 5' UTR conformation has a free energy of -124.30 kcal/mol. In the 3' UTR, there are 6 predicted stem loops to occur with a free energy of -310.70 kcal/mol, which is spontaneously formed. There are no known microRNA targets in the 3' UTR.

== Homology and Evolution ==
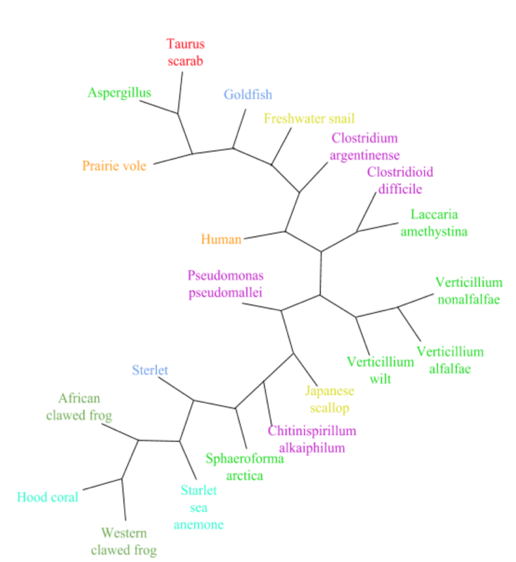
LOC101928193 Unrooted Phylogenetic Tree. Color coded by taxonomic group: Mammals (orange), amphibians (green), fish (blue), mollusks (yellow), cnidarians (teal), fungi (lime green), and bacteria (purple).

=== Paralogs ===
There are no known paralogs of LOC101928193.

=== Orthologs ===
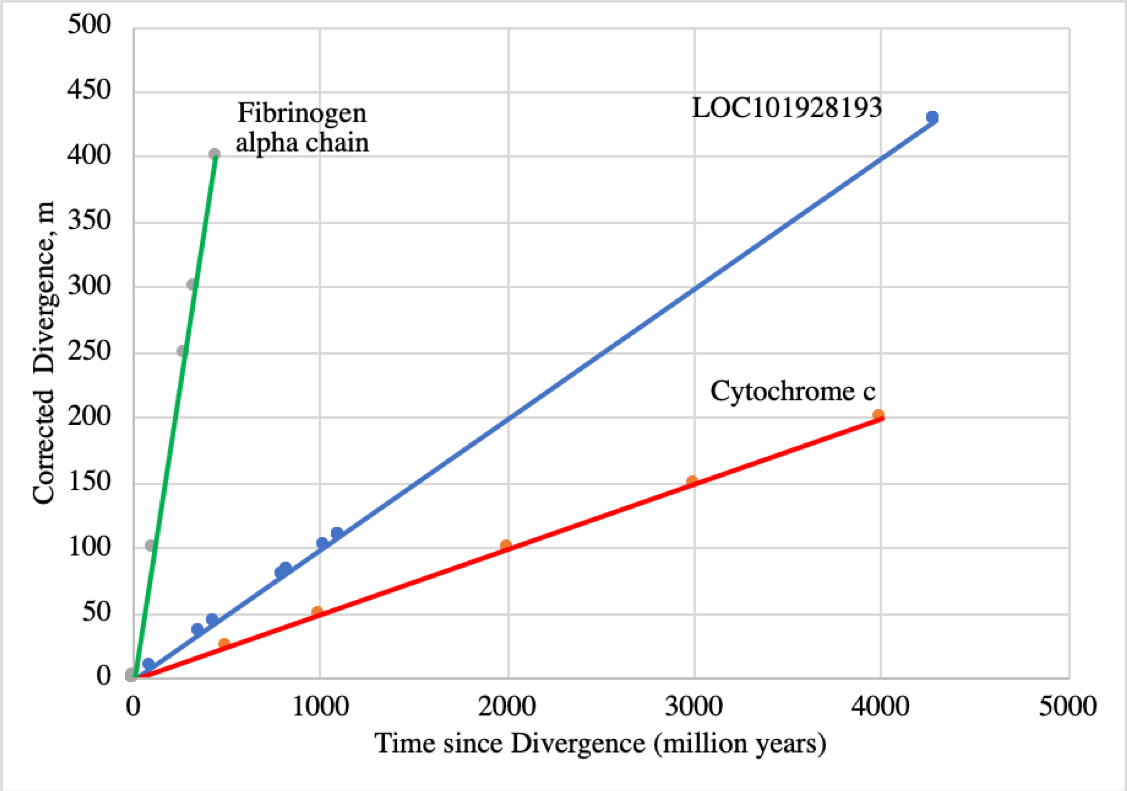
LOC101929193 rate of evolution in comparison to cytochrome c and fibrinogen.

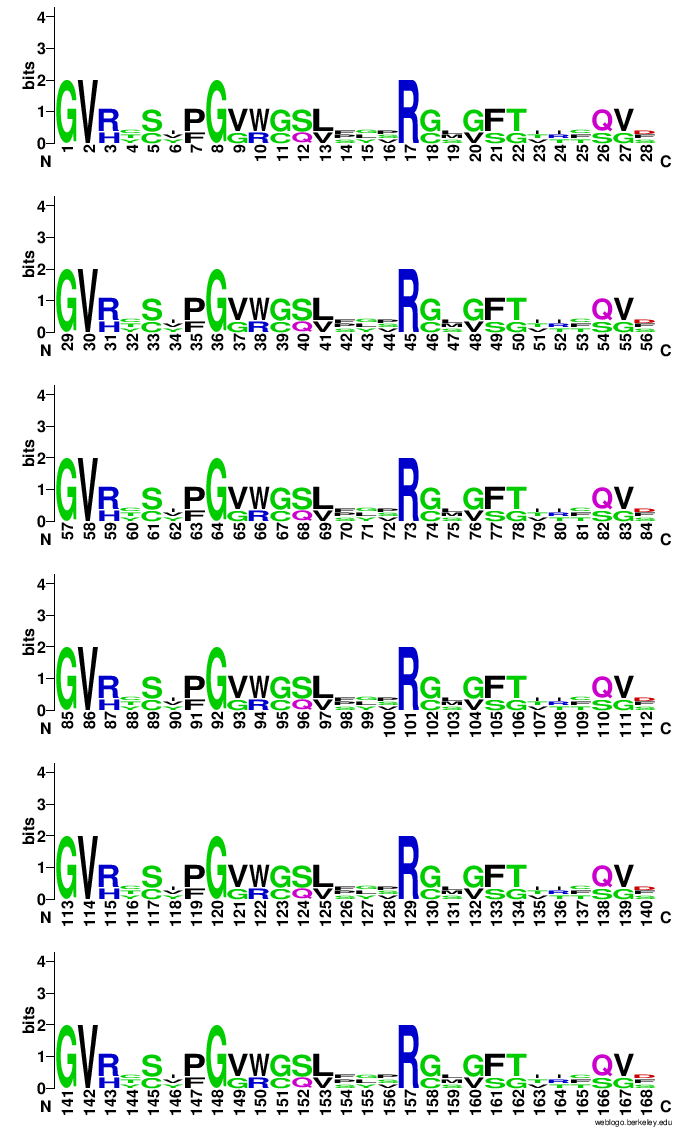
LOC101928193 conserved coding domain found from a multiple sequence alignment of orthologs. A sequence logo provides a richer and more precise description of, for example, a binding site, than would a consensus sequence.

LOC101928193 has over 20 orthologs that are present in mammals, amphibians, fish, mollusks, cnidarians, fungi, and bacteria. The most distant orthologs are found in bacteria that diverged from humans more than 4.29 billion years ago. No orthologs for LOC101928193 have been discovered in close mammalian relatives of humans, including in primates. Below is a table of a range of organisms with orthologs related to the human LOC101928193 protein.

LOC101928193 Orthologs
Species	Common name	Date of divergence (MYA)	NCBI accession #	Sequence length (amino acids)	Protein identity	Protein similarity
Homo sapiens	Humans	0	XP_011517577	406	100%	100%
Microtus ochrogaster	Prairie vole	90	XP_026643651	173	33%	45%
Xenopus tropicalis	Western clawed frog	352	OCA32729	259	25%	33%
Xenopus laevis	African clawed frog	352	OCT75465	167	26%	41%
Acipenser ruthenus	Sterlet	435	RXM92228	259	25%	33%
Carassius auratus	Goldfish	435	XP_026133143	437	25%	35%
Biomphalaria glabrata	Freshwater snail	797	XP_013067916	131	31%	47%
Mizuhopecten yessoensis	Japanese scallop	797	OWF44451	284	15%	32%
Onthophagus taurus	Taurus scarab	797	XP_022903359	294	24%	33%
Stylophora pistillata	Hood coral	824	PFX21561	126	37%	42%
Nematostella vectensis	Starlet sea anemone	824	XP_001641289	418	31%	36%
Sphaeroforma arctica	Sphaeroforma arctica	1023	XP_014147604	123	34%	47%
Verticillium alfalfe	Verticillium alfalfe	1105	XP_003000049	355	28%	35%
Chitinispirillum alkaliphilum	Chitinispirillum alkaliphilum	4290	KMQ49642	105	42%	55%
Burkholderia pseudomallei	Pseudomonas pseudomallei	4290	ALJ75351	238	33%	42%

=== Distant homologs ===
The most distant detectable homolog is in several viral and bacterial species that diverged from humans over 4.29 billion years ago.

=== Homologous domains ===
There is a conserved coding region of 28 amino acids that is repeated six times in the protein-encoding region within LOC101928193 and across its orthologs. This domain begins with a glycine at the amino acid position of 194, 222, 250, 278, 306, and 334 within LOC101928193. The domain is conserved across mammals, cnidarians, fish, bacteria, and amphibians, and even in some species within these taxonomic groups that are not orthologs but share the same domain. The sequence always begins with a polar glycine and a hydrophobic valine. There is also a conserved basic arginine within the middle of the sequence.

=== Phylogeny ===
No other species has LOC101928193 in the same form as in humans. Several species within mammals, amphibians, fish, mollusks, cnidarians, fungi, and bacteria have LOC101928193 in a slightly different form with a similarity usually between 30 and 50%. Several taxonomic groups do not express any proteins or genes similar to LOC101928193 including Archaeans, plants, and several animal species.

=== Inheritance ===
LOC101928193 may not follow a normal inheritance pattern or occur regularly in the genome as it has a scattered occurrence throughout evolutionarily related species. Furthermore, the similarity between orthologs of LOC101928193 is constant over time and is not higher in closely related taxonomic groups or lower in distantly related taxonomic groups. It is possible that LOC101928193 incorporates into the genome of different species through viral pathways as LOC101928193 has been found to have ligand binding sites for cyanobacteria proteins, like chlorophyll a. Orthologs of LOC101928193 have been found to contain UL36, which is a large tegument protein that functions in the viral cycle and is commonly found in human herpesvirus simplex virus 1.

== Suggested Reading ==
- Olsen JV, Blagoev B, Gnad F, Macek B, Kumar C, Mortensen P, Mann M (November 2006). "Global, in vivo, and site-specific phosphorylation dynamics in signaling networks". Cell. 127 (3): 635–48. doi:10.1016/j.cell.2006.09.026. PMID 17081983. S2CID 7827573.
- Gerhard DS, Wagner L, Feingold EA, Shenmen CM, Grouse LH, Schuler G, et al. (October 2004). "The status, quality, and expansion of the NIH full-length cDNA project: the Mammalian Gene Collection (MGC)". Genome Research. 14 (10B): 2121–7. doi:10.1101/gr.2596504. PMC 528928. PMID 15489334.
- Strausberg RL, Feingold EA, Grouse LH, Derge JG, Klausner RD, Collins FS, et al. (December 2002). "Generation and initial analysis of more than 15,000 full-length human and mouse cDNA sequences". Proceedings of the National Academy of Sciences of the United States of America. 99 (26): 16899–903. Bibcode:2002PNAS...9916899M. doi:10.1073/pnas.242603899. PMC 139241. PMID 12477932.
