= Duffy antigen system =

Human blood group classification

ACKR1

Identifiers
- Aliases: ACKR1, atypical chemokine receptor 1 (Duffy blood group), CCBP1, CD234, Dfy, FY, GPD, GpFy, WBCQ1, DARC, DARC/ACKR1
- External IDs: OMIM: 613665; MGI: 1097689; GeneCards: ACKR1
Available structures
PDB	Ortholog search: PDBe RCSB
PDB	List of PDB id codes 4NUU, 4NUV

Gene location (Human)
Chr.	Chromosome 1 (human)
Band	1q23.2	Start	159,203,307 bp
Band	1q23.2	End	159,206,500 bp

Gene location (Mouse)
Chr.	Chromosome 1 (mouse)
Band	1 H3|1 80.33 cM	Start	173,159,453 bp
Band	1 H3|1 80.33 cM	End	173,161,317 bp
RNA expression pattern
Bgee	Human / Mouse (ortholog); Top expressed in: vena cava; left uterine tube; gastric mucosa; subcutaneous adipose tissue; pericardium; tibial nerve; olfactory zone of nasal mucosa; ectocervix; coronary artery; canal of the cervix / Top expressed in: cerebellar cortex; layer of retina; neural layer of retina; bone marrow; primary visual cortex; superior frontal gyrus; striatum of neuraxis; hippocampus proper; olfactory bulb; hypothalamus; More reference expression data
BioGPS	n/a
Gene ontology
Molecular function	C-C chemokine binding; G protein-coupled receptor activity; transmembrane signaling receptor activity; signal transducer activity; chemokine binding; protein binding; signaling receptor activity
Cellular component	integral component of membrane; recycling endosome; endosome; plasma membrane; early endosome; membrane
Biological process	chemokine-mediated signaling pathway; regulation of chemokine production; G protein-coupled receptor signaling pathway; defense response; inflammatory response; signal transduction
Sources:Amigo / QuickGO
Orthologs
Databases	NCBI: entry; OMA: entry
Species	Human	Mouse
Entrez	2532	13349
Ensembl	ENSG00000213088	ENSMUSG00000037872
UniProt	Q16570	Q9QUI6
RefSeq (mRNA)	NM_002036; NM_001122951	NM_010045
RefSeq (protein)	NP_001116423; NP_002027	NP_034175
Location (UCSC)	Chr 1: 159.2 – 159.21 Mb	Chr 1: 173.16 – 173.16 Mb
PubMed search
- Wikidata
View/Edit Human	View/Edit Mouse

Duffy antigen/chemokine receptor (DARC), also known as Fy glycoprotein (FY) or CD234 (Cluster of Differentiation 234), is a protein that in humans is encoded by the ACKR1 gene.

The Duffy antigen is located on the surface of red blood cells, and is named after the patient in whom it was discovered. The protein encoded by this gene is a glycosylated membrane protein and a non-specific receptor for several chemokines. The protein is also the receptor for the human malarial parasites Plasmodium vivax, Plasmodium knowlesi and simian malarial parasite Plasmodium cynomolgi. Polymorphisms in this gene are the basis of the Duffy blood group system.

== History ==
It was noted in the 1920s that black Africans had some intrinsic resistance to malaria, but the basis for this remained unknown. The Duffy antigen gene was the fourth gene associated with the resistance after the genes responsible for sickle cell anaemia, thalassemia and glucose-6-phosphate dehydrogenase.

In 1950, the Duffy antigen was discovered in a multiply-transfused hemophiliac named Richard Duffy, whose serum contained the first example of anti-Fya antibody. In 1951, the antibody to a second antigen, Fyb, was discovered in serum. Using these two antibodies, three common phenotypes were defined: Fy(a+b+), Fy(a+b-), and Fy(a-b+).

Several other types were later discovered bringing the current total up to 5: Fya, Fyb, Fy3, Fy5 and Fy6. Only Fya, Fyb and Fy3 are considered clinically important. Reactions to Fy5 and Fy6 have only rarely been reported. The Fy4 antigen, originally described on Fy (a–b–) RBCs, was obsoleted in 2010 because of scant evidence.

== Genetics and genomics ==
The Duffy antigen/chemokine receptor gene (gp-Fy; CD234) is located on the long arm of chromosome 1 (1.q22-1.q23) and was cloned in 1993. The gene was first localised to chromosome 1 in 1968, and was the first blood system antigen to be localised. It is a single copy gene spanning over 1500 bases and is in two exons. The gene encodes a 336 amino acid acidic glycoprotein. It carries the antigenic determinants of the Duffy blood group system which consist of four codominant alleles—FY*A and FY*B—coding for the Fy-a and Fy-b antigens respectively, FY*X and FY*Fy, five phenotypes (Fy-a, Fy-b, Fy-o, Fy-x and Fy-y) and five antigens. Fy-x is a form of Fy-b where the Fy-b gene is poorly expressed. Fy-x is also known as Fy-b^{weak} or Fy-b^{Wk}.

This gene has been redesignated ACKR1.

Fy-a and Fy-b differ by in a single amino acid at position 42: glycine in Fy-a and aspartic acid in Fy-b (guanine in Fy-a and adenosine in Fy-b at position 125). A second mutation causing a Duffy negative phenotype is known: the responsible mutation is G -> A at position 298. The genetic basis for the Fy(a-b-) phenotype is a point mutation in the erythroid specific promoter (a T -> C mutation at position -33 in the GATA box). This mutation occurs in the Fy-b allele and has been designated Fy-b^{Es} (erythroid silent). Two isotypes have been identified. The Fy-x allele is characterized by a weak anti-Fy-b reaction and appears to be the result of two separate transitions: Cytosine265Threonine (Arginine89Cysteine) and Guanine298Adenosine (Alanine100Threonine). A third mutation (a transversion) in this gene has also been described - G145T (Alanine49Serine) - that has been associated with the Fy-x phenotype.

Most Duffy negative black people carry a silent Fy-b allele with a single T to C substitution at nucleotide -33, impairing the promoter activity in erythroid cells by disrupting a binding site for the GATA1 erythroid transcription factor. The gene is still transcribed in non erythroid cells in the presence of this mutation.

The Duffy negative phenotype occurs at low frequency among whites (~3.5%) and is due to a third mutation that results in an unstable protein (Arg89Cys: cytosine -> thymidine at position 265).

The silent allele has evolved at least twice in the black population of Africa and evidence for selection for this allele has been found. The selection pressure involved here appears to be more complex than many text books might suggest. An independent evolution of this phenotype that occurred in Papua New Guinea has also been documented.

A comparative study of this gene in seven mammalian species revealed significant differences between species. The species examined included Pan troglodytes (chimpanzee), Macaca mulatta (rhesus monkey), Pongo pygmaeus (orangutan), Rattus norvegicus (brown rat), Mus musculus (mouse), Monodelphis domestica (opossum), Bos taurus (cow) and Canis familiaris (dog).

Three exons are present in humans and chimpanzees, whereas only two exons occur in the other species. This additional exon is located at the 5' end and is entirely non coding. Both intron and exon size vary considerably between the species examined. Between the chimpanzee and the human, 24 differences in the nucleotide sequence were noted. Of these 18 occurred in non coding regions. Of the remaining 6, 3 were synonymous and 3 non synonymous mutations. The significance of these mutations if any is not known.

The mouse ortholog has been cloned and exhibits 63% homology to the human gene at the amino acid level. The mouse gene is located on chromosome 1 between the genetic markers Xmv41 and D1Mit166. The mouse gene has two exons (100 and 1064 nucleotides in length), separated by a 461 base pair intron. In the mouse DARC is expressed during embryonic development between days 9.5 and 12.

In yellow baboons (Papio cynocephalus) mutations in this gene have been associated with protection from infection with species of the genus Hepatocystis.

The ancestral form of extant DARC alleles in humans appears to be the FY*B allele.

The gene appears to be under strong purifying selection. The cause of this selective pressure has not yet been identified.

== Molecular biology ==
Biochemical analysis of the Duffy antigen has shown that it has a high content of α-helical secondary structure - typical of chemokine receptors. Its N-glycans are mostly of the triantennary complex type terminated with α2-3- and α2-6-linked sialic acid residues with bisecting GlcNAc and α1-6-linked fucose at the core.

The Duffy antigen is expressed in greater quantities on reticulocytes than on mature erythrocytes. While the Duffy antigen is expressed on bone marrow erythroblasts and circulating erythrocytes it is also found on Purkinje cells of the cerebellum, endothelial cells of thyroid capillaries, the post-capillary venules of some organs including the spleen, liver and kidney and the large pulmonary venules. Duffy antigen has then a unique cell expression profile in cerebellar neurons, venular endothelial cells and erythroid cells. In some people who lack the Duffy antigen on their erythrocytes it is still expressed in the other cell types.

It has two potential N-linked glycosylation sites at asparagine (Asn) 16 and Asn27.

The Duffy antigen has been found to act as a multispecific receptor for chemokines of both the C-C and C-X-C families, including:

- monocyte chemotactic protein-1 (MCP-1) - CCL2
- regulated upon activation normal T expressed and secreted (RANTES) - CCL5
- melanoma growth stimulatory activity (MSGA-α), KC, neutrophil-activating protein 3 (NAP-3) - CXCL1/CXCL2

and the angiogenic CXC chemokines:

- Growth related gene alpha (GRO-α) - CXCL1
- Platelet factor 4 - CXCL4
- ENA-78 - CXCL5
- Neutrophil activating peptide-2 (NAP-2) - CXCL7
- Interleukin-8 (IL-8) - CXCL8

Consequently, the Fy protein is also known as DARC (Duffy Antigen Receptor for Chemokines). The chemokine binding site on the receptor appears to be localised to the amino terminus. The antigen is predicted to have 7 transmembrane domains, an exocellular N-terminal domain and an endocellular C-terminal domain. Alignment with other seven transmembrane G-protein-coupled receptors shows that DARC lacks the highly conserved DRY motif in the second intracellular loop of the protein that is known to be associated with G-protein signaling. Consistent with this finding ligand binding by DARC does not induce G-protein coupled signal transduction nor a Ca2+ flux unlike other chemokine receptors. Based on these alignments the Duffy antigen is considered to be most similar to the interleukin-8B receptors.

Scatchard analysis of competition binding studies has shown high affinity binding to the Duffy antigen with dissociation constants (KD) binding values of 24 ± 4.9, 20 ± 4.7, 41.9 ± 12.8, and 33.9 ± 7 nanoMoles for MGSA, interleukin-8, RANTES and monocyte chemotactic peptide-1 respectively.

In DARC-transfected cells, DARC is internalized following ligand binding and this led to the hypothesis that expression of DARC on the surface of erythrocytes, endothelial, neuronal cells and epithelial cells may act as a sponge and provide a mechanism by which inflammatory chemokines may be removed from circulation as well as their concentration modified in the local environment. This hypothesis has also been questioned after knock out mice were created. These animals appeared healthy and had normal responses to infection. While the function of the Duffy antigen remains presently (2006) unknown, evidence is accumulating that suggests a role in neutrophil migration from the blood into the tissues and in modulating the inflammatory response.

The protein is also known to interact with the protein KAI1 (CD82) a surface glycoprotein of leukocytes and may have a role in the control of cancer.

The Duffy antigen has been shown to exist as a constitutive homo-oligomer and that it hetero-oligomerizes with the CC chemokine receptor CCR5 (CD195). The formation of this heterodimer impairs chemotaxis and calcium flux through CCR5, whereas internalization of CCR5 in response to ligand binding remains unchanged.

DARC has been shown to internalise chemokines but does not scavenge them. It mediates chemokine transcytosis, which leads to apical retention of intact chemokines and more leukocyte migration.

Binding melanoma growth-stimulating activity inhibits the binding of P. knowlesi to DARC.

== Population genetics ==
Differences in the racial distribution of the Duffy antigens were discovered in 1954, when it was found that the overwhelming majority of people of African descent had the erythrocyte phenotype Fy(a-b-): 68% in African Americans and 88-100% in African people (including more than 90% of West African people). This phenotype is exceedingly rare in Whites. Because the Duffy antigen is uncommon in those of Black African descent, the presence of this antigen has been used to detect genetic admixture. In a sample of unrelated African Americans (n = 235), Afro-Caribbeans (n = 90) and Colombians (n = 93), the frequency of the -46T (Duffy positive) allele was 21.7%, 12.2% and 74.7% respectively.

Overall the frequencies of Fya and Fyb antigens in Whites are 66% and 83% respectively, in Asians 99% and 18.5% respectively and in blacks 10% and 23% respectively. The frequency of Fy3 is 100% Whites, 99.9% Asians and 32% Blacks. Phenotype frequencies are:

- Fy(a+b+): 49% Whites, 1% Blacks, 9% Chinese
- Fy(a-b+): 34% Whites, 22% Blacks, <1% Chinese
- Fy(a+b-): 17% Whites, 9% Blacks, 91% Chinese

While a possible role in the protection of humans from malaria was suggested, this was only confirmed clinically in 1976. Since then many surveys have been carried out to elucidate the prevalence of Duffy antigen alleles in different populations including:

- The mutation Ala100Thr (G -> A in the first codon position—base number 298) within the FY*B allele was thought to be purely a White genotype, but has since been described in Brazilians. However, the study's authors point out that the Brazilian population has arisen from intermarriage between Portuguese, Black Africans, and Indians, which accounts for the presence of this mutation in a few members of Brazil's non-White groups. Two of the three Afro-Brazilian test subjects that were found to have the mutation (out of a total of 25 Afro-Brazilians tested) were also related to one another, as one was a mother and the other her daughter.
- This antigen along with other blood group antigens was used to identify the Basque people as a genetically separate group. Its use in forensic science is under consideration.
- The Andaman and Nicobar Islands, part of India, were originally inhabited by 14 aboriginal tribes. Several of these have gone extinct. One surviving tribe—the Jarawas—live in three jungle areas of South Andaman and one jungle area in Middle Andaman. The area is endemic for malaria. The causative species is Plasmodium falciparum: there is no evidence for the presence of Plasmodium vivax. Blood grouping revealed an absence of both Fy(a) and Fy(b) antigens in two areas and a low prevalence in two others.
- Among Yemenite Jews the frequency of the Fy allele is 0.5879. The frequency of this allele varies from 0.1083 to 0.2191 among Jews from the Middle East, North Africa and Southern Europe. The incidence of Fya among Ashkenazi Jews is 0.44 and among the non-Ashkenazi Jews it is 0.33. The incidence of Fyb is higher in both groups with frequencies of 0.53 and 0.64 respectively.
- In Chinese ethnic populations—the Han and the She people—the frequencies of Fya and Fyb alleles were 0.94 and 0.06 and 0.98 and 0.02 respectively.
- The frequency of the Fya allele in most Asian populations is ~95%.
- In Grande Comore (also known as Ngazidja) the frequency of the Fy(a- b-) phenotype is 0.86.
- The incidence of Fy(a+b-) in northern India among blood donors is 43.85%.
- In the Maghreb, Horn of Africa and the Nile Valley, the Afroasiatic (Hamitic-Semitic) speaking populations are largely Duffy-positive. Between 70%-98% of Hamito-Semitic groups in Ethiopia were found to be Duffy-positive. Serological and DNA based analysis of 115 unrelated Tunisians also found an FY*X frequency of 0.0174; FY*1 = 0.291 (expressed 0.260, silent 0.031); FY*2 = 0.709 (expressed 0.427; silent 0.282). Since the FY*2 silent is the most common allele in West Africa, its minor occurrence in the sample probably represents recent diffusion from the latter region.
- In Nouakchott, Mauritania overall 27% of the population are Duffy-positive. 54% of Moors are Duffy antigen positive, while only 2% of black ethnic groups (mainly Poular, Soninke and Wolof) are Duffy positive.
- A map of the Duffy antigen distribution has been produced. The most prevalent allele globally is FY*A. Across sub-Saharan Africa the predominant allele is the silent FY*B^{ES} variant.
- In Iran the Fy (a-b-) phenotype was found in 3.4%.

There appears to have been a selective sweep in Africa which reduced the incidence of this antigen there. This sweep appears to have occurred between 6,500 and 97,200 years ago (95% confidence interval)

The distribution within India has been studied in some detail.

== Clinical significance ==
Historically the role of this antigen other than its importance as a receptor for Plasmodium protozoa has not been appreciated. Recent work has identified a number of additional roles for this protein.

=== Malaria ===
On erythrocytes, the Duffy antigen acts as a receptor for invasion by the human malarial parasites P. vivax and P. knowlesi. This was first shown in 1980. Duffy negative individuals whose erythrocytes do not express the receptor are believed to be resistant to merozoite invasion although P. vivax infection has been reported in Duffy negative children in Kenya, suggesting a role in resistance to disease, not infection. This antigen may also play a role in erythrocyte invasion in the rodent malarial parasite P. yoelii. The epitope Fy6 is required for P. vivax invasion.

The protection to P. vivax malaria conferred by the absence of the Duffy antigen appears to be very limited at best in Madagascar. Although 72% of the population are Duffy antigen negative, 8.8% of the Duffy antigen negative individuals were asymptomatic carriers of P. vivax. Malaria has also been found in Angola and Equatorial Guinea in Duffy negative individuals. P. vivax malaria in a Duffy antigen negative individual in Mauritania has also been reported. Similar infections have been reported in Brazil and Kenya. Additional cases of infection in Duffy antigen negative individuals have been reported from the Congo and Uganda. A study in Brazil of the protection against P. vivax offered by the lack of the Duffy antigen found no differential resistance to malaria vivax between Duffy antigen positive and negative individuals.

Nancy Ma's night monkey (A. nancymaae) is used as an animal model of P. vivax infection. This species' erythrocytes possess the Duffy antigen and this antigen is used as the receptor for P. vivax on the erythrocytes in this species.

Examination of this gene in 497 patients in the Amazonas State, Brazil, made by the doctor Sérgio Albuquerque, suggests that the genotypes FY*A/FY*B-33 and FY*B/FY*B-33 (where -33 refers to the null mutation at position -33 in the GATA box) may have an advantage over the genotypes FY*A/FY*B and FY*A/FY*A, FY*A/FY*B, FY*A/FY*X and FY*B/FY*X. FY*A/FY*B and FY*A/FY*A genotypes showed to be associated with increased rates of P. vivax infection and FY*B/FY*X and FY*A/FY*X were shown to be associated with the low levels of parasitism.

A difference between the susceptibility to Plasmodium vivax malaria has been reported. Erythrocytes expressing Fya had 41-50% lower binding of P. vivax compared with Fyb cells. Individuals with the Fy(a+b-) phenotype have a 30-80% reduced risk of clinical vivax but not falciparum malaria.

The binding of platelet factor 4 (CXCL4) appears to be critical for the platelet induced killing of P. falciparum.

The Duffy antigen binding protein in P. vivax is composed of three subdomains and is thought to function as a dimer. The critical DARC binding residues are concentrated at the dimer interface and along a relatively flat surface spanning portions of two subdomains.

A study in Brazil confirmed the protective effect of FY*A/FY*O against malaria. In contrast the genotype FY*B/FY*O was associated with a greater risk.

=== Asthma ===
Asthma is more common and tends to be more severe in those of African descent. There appears to be a correlation with both total IgE levels and asthma and mutations in the Duffy antigen.

=== Hematopoiesis ===
Duffy antigen plays a fundamental role on hematopoiesis. Indeed, nucleated red blood cells present in the bone marrow have high expression of DARC, which facilitates their direct contact with hematopoietic stem cells. The absence of erythroid DARC alters hematopoiesis including stem and progenitor cells, which ultimately gives rise to phenotypically distinct neutrophils. As a result, mature neutrophils of Duffy-negative individuals carry more molecular "weapons" against infectious pathogens. Therefore, alternative physiological patterns of hematopoiesis and bone marrow cell outputs depend on the expression of DARC in the erythroid lineage.

=== Benign ethnic neutropenia ===
Individuals with the Duffy-null genotype have a persistently lower neutrophil count than the typical laboratory normal range, but the lower amount of circulating neutrophils associated with this genotype does not seem to confer an increased risk of infection. Clinical use of the term "benign ethnic neutropenic" to describe this phenomenon remains widespread, but the term is problematic as the Duffy-null genotype is common in individuals with African and certain Middle Eastern ancestries, and the term implies that individuals with European ancestry have the normal reference neutrophil count. The term "Duffy-null associated neutrophil count" (DANC) has been proposed as a replacement.

The distinctive neutrophils that are formed in the absence of DARC on erythroid lineage (see above - role of DARC on hematopoiesis) readily leave the blood stream, which explains the apparent lower numbers of neutrophils in the blood of Duffy-null individuals. Failure to recognize that individuals with African ancestry often have healthy Duffy-null antigen-associated neutrophil counts instead of neutropenia has historically contributed to inequity in access to medications that require blood monitoring due to risk of neutropenia, including chemotherapy and the antipsychotic medication clozapine. The lower number of circulating neutrophils can cause individuals with the Duffy-null genotype to fall below what typically would be considered safe to continue these treatments, despite new data showing that neutrophil functioning is preserved in these individuals.

=== Cancer ===
Interactions between the metastasis suppressor KAI1 on tumor cells and the cytokine receptor DARC on adjacent vascular cells suppresses tumor metastasis. In human breast cancer samples low expression of the DARC protein is significantly associated with estrogen receptor status, both lymph node and distant metastasis and poor survival.

=== Endotoxin response ===
The procoagulant response to lipopolysaccharide (bacterial endotoxin) is reduced in Duffy antigen negative Africans compared with Duffy positive Whites. This difference is likely to involve additional genes.

=== HIV infection ===
A connection has been found between HIV susceptibility and the expression of the Duffy antigen. The absence of the DARC receptor appears to increase the susceptibility to infection by HIV. However once established, the absence of the DARC receptor appears to slow down the progression of the disease.

HIV-1 appears to be able to attach to erythrocytes via DARC.

The association between the Duffy antigen and HIV infection appears to be complex. Leukopenia (a low total white cell count) is associated with relatively poor survival in HIV infection and this association is more marked in whites than in people of Black African descent, despite the (on average) lower white cell counts found in black Africans. This difference appears to correlate with a particular genotype (-46C/C) associated with the absence of the Duffy antigen. This genotype has only been found in black Africans and their descendants. The strength of this association increases inversely with the total white cell count. The basis for this association is probably related to the role of the Duffy antigen in cytokine binding but this has yet to be verified.

A study of 142 black South African high-risk female sex workers over 2 years revealed a seroconversion rate of 19.0%. Risk of seroconversion appeared to be correlated with Duffy-null-associated low neutrophil counts.

=== Inflammation ===
An association with the levels monocyte chemoattractant protein-1 has been reported.

In the Sardinian population, an association of several variants in the DARC gene (coding and non-coding) correlates with increased serum levels of monocyte chemoattractant protein (MCP -1). A new variant in this population, consisting of the amino acid substitution of arginine for a cysteine at position 89 of the protein diminishes the ability to bind chemokines.

DARC has also been linked to rheumatoid arthritis (RA), possibly displaying chemokines such as CXCL5 on the surface of endothelial cells within the synovium, increasing the recruitment of neutrophils in the disease state.

=== Lung transplantation ===
The Duffy antigen has been implicated in lung transplantation rejection.

=== Multiple myeloma ===
An increased incidence of Duffy antigen has been reported in patients with multiple myeloma compared with healthy controls.

=== Pneumonia ===
The Duffy antigen is present in the normal pulmonary vascular bed. Its expression is increased in the vascular beds and alveolar septa of the lung parenchyma during suppurative pneumonia.

=== Pregnancy ===
Duffy antigen has been implicated in haemolytic disease of the newborn.

=== Prostate cancer ===
Experimental work has suggested that DARC expression inhibits prostate tumor growth. Men of black African descent are at greater risk of prostate cancer than men of either European or Asian descent (60% greater incidence and double the mortality compared to Whites). However, the contribution of DARC to this increased risk has been tested in Jamaican males of black African descent. It was found that none of the increased risk could be attributed to the DARC gene. The reason for this increased risk is as yet unknown.

=== Renal transplantion ===
Antibodies and a cellular response to the Duffy antigen have been associated with renal transplant rejection.

=== Sickle cell anaemia ===
Duffy antigen-negative individuals with sickle cell anaemia tend to sustain more severe organ damage than do those with the Duffy antigen. Duffy-positive patients exhibit higher counts of white blood cells, polynuclear neutrophils, higher plasma levels of IL-8 and RANTES than Duffy-negative patients.

=== Southeast Asian ovalocytosis ===
There is a ~10% increase in Fy expression in Southeast Asian ovalocytosis erythrocytes.

=== Transfusion medicine ===
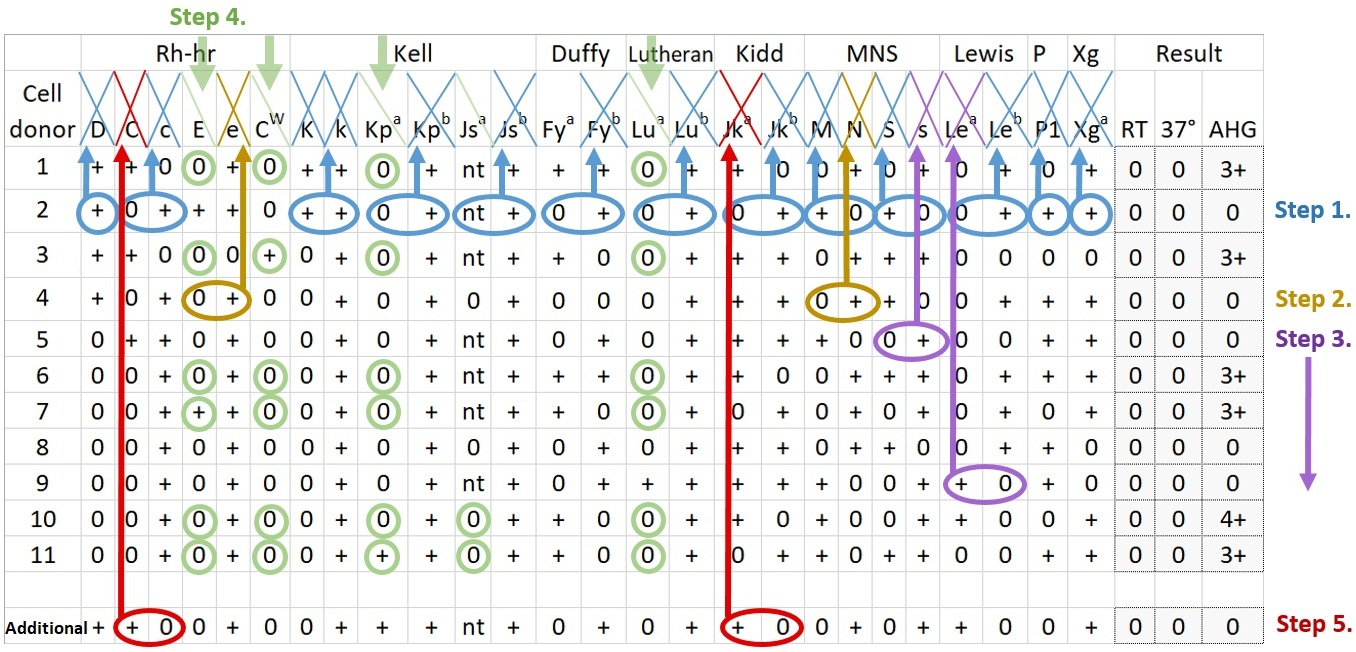
Interpretation of antibody panel to detect patient antibodies towards the most relevant human blood group systems, including Duffy.

A Duffy negative blood recipient may have a transfusion reaction if the donor is Duffy positive. Since most Duffy-negative people are of African descent, blood donations from people of black African origin are important to transfusion banks.

== Clinical diagnostic ==
Clinical testing in patient care for Duffy antigens follows published minimum quality and operational requirements, similar to red cell genotyping for any of the other recognized blood group systems. Molecular analysis can identify gene variants (alleles) that may affect Duffy antigens expression on the red cell membrane.

== Transfusion data ==
International Society for Blood Transfusion (ISBT) symbol: FY

ISBT number: 008

Gene symbol: FY

Gene name: Duffy blood group

Number of Duffy antigens: 6

=== Antibody type ===
Almost entirely IgG. IgG1 usually predominates. IgM does occur but is rare.

=== Antibody behavior ===
Anti-Fy^{a} is a common antibody while anti-Fy^{b} is approximately 20 times less common., They are reactive at body temperature and are therefore clinically significant, although they do not typically bind complement. Antibodies are acquired through exposure (pregnancy or history of blood transfusion) and subsequent alloimmunization. They display dosage (react more strongly to homozygous cells versus heterozygous cells).

=== Transfusion reactions ===
Typically mild but may be serious, even fatal. Although these usually occur immediately they may occur after a delay (up to 24 hours). These reactions are usually caused by anti-Fy^{a} or anti-Fy^{b}. anti-Fy3 may cause acute or delayed hemolytic transfusion reactions, but only rarely. Anti-Fy5 may also cause delayed hemolytic transfusion reactions.

=== Hemolytic disease of the fetus and newborn ===
Hemolytic disease of the fetus and newborn is typically mild but rarely may be serious. Almost always due to anti-Fy^{a} and rarely anti-Fyb or Fy3.
