= Indian blood group system =

Human blood group system

The Indian blood group system (In) is a classification of blood based on the presence or absence of inherited antigens that reside within the CD44 molecule that is expressed on the surface of blood cells. It is named so because 4% of the population in India possess it. Most individuals express the In^{b} antigen that results from an arginine residue at position 46 of CD44 . The In^{a} blood type results from a substitution proline for arginine at this same position.

== Clinical diagnostic ==
Clinical testing in patient care for Indian antigens follows published minimum quality and operational requirements, similar to red cell genotyping for any of the other recognized blood group systems. Molecular analysis can identify gene variants (alleles) that may affect Indian antigens expression on the red cell membrane.
