= Yt antigen system =

Human blood group system

The Yt antigen system (also known as Cartwright) is present on the membrane of red blood cells and helps determine a person's blood type. The antigens are found on the protein acetylcholinesterase, an enzyme which helps break down acetylcholine. The Yt system features two alleles, Yt(a) and Yt(b). Antibodies against the Yt system can lead to transfusion reactions such as hemolytic anemia.

== Clinical diagnostic ==
Clinical testing in patient care for Yt antigens follows published minimum quality and operational requirements, similar to red cell genotyping for any of the other recognized blood group systems. Molecular analysis can identify gene variants (alleles) that may affect Yt antigens expression on the red cell membrane.
