= Junior blood group system =

Human blood group system

ABCG2 (Junior blood group antigen)

Identifiers
- Symbol: ABCG2
- NCBI gene: 9429
- HGNC: 74
- OMIM: 614490
- UniProt: Q9UNQ0

Other data
- Locus: Chr. 4 q22.1
Search for
- Structures: Swiss-model
- Domains: InterPro

The Junior blood group system (or JR) is a human blood group defined by the presence or absence of the Jr(a) antigen, a high-frequency antigen that is found on the red blood cells of most individuals. People with the rare Jr(a) negative blood type can develop anti-Jr(a) antibodies, which may cause transfusion reactions and hemolytic disease of the newborn on subsequent exposures. Jr(a) negative blood is most common in people of Japanese heritage.

== Genetics ==
Autosomal recessive inheritance

The gene ABCG2, located on chromosome 4q22.1, encodes an ATP-binding cassette transporter protein that carries the Jr(a) antigen. The Jr(a) negative blood type is inherited in an autosomal recessive manner: individuals who are homozygous for a null mutation of ABCG2 express this phenotype. Homozygosity for certain missense mutations, or heterozygosity for a missense mutation and a null mutation, can result in a weak phenotype with decreased expression of Jr(a) antigen. As of 2018, over 25 null and weak alleles of ABCG2 have been described.

== Epidemiology ==
The highest rates of the Jr(a) negative blood type have been reported in Japan, where its prevalence ranges from 1 in 60 in the Niigata region to 1 in 3800 in the Tokyo region. Additionally, a number of cases have been documented in European Romani populations. The Jr(a) negative blood type is very rare in America: a study of 9,545 Americans failed to identify any Jr(a) negative individuals.

== Clinical significance ==
Anti-Jr(a) antibodies are generally composed of Immunoglobulin G and develop when individuals are exposed to Jr(a) positive blood through pregnancy or blood transfusion. Some cases of anti-Jr(a) have been reported in patients who have not been previously transfused or pregnant.

Jr(a) is more strongly expressed on cord blood cells than on adult red blood cells, and anti-Jr(a) has been reported to cause hemolytic disease of the newborn (HDN), including fatal cases of HDN. The antibody has also been implicated in delayed hemolytic transfusion reactions. However, the clinical significance of the antibody is variable: in some cases, individuals with anti-Jr(a) have been transfused with Jr(a) positive blood or given birth to Jr(a) positive babies without incident. It is recommended to transfuse individuals with anti-Jr(a) with Jr(a) negative blood if the antibody titer is high. In other cases, "least incompatible" blood (the blood unit that gives the weakest reactions during crossmatching) may be suitable. It is difficult to secure Jr(a) negative donor blood due to the rarity of this blood type.

ABCG2 is a uric acid transporter, and the Jr(a) negative phenotype is associated with gout in Japanese populations.

== Laboratory testing ==
An individual's Junior blood type can be determined by serologic testing, which uses a monoclonal antibody reagent directed against the Jr(a) antigen. DNA testing may be impractical due to the high number of mutations affecting Jr(a) expression.

Anti-Jr(a) antibodies are most easily detected by the indirect antiglobulin test, and their reactivity is enhanced by enzyme treatment with ficin or papain.

== Clinical diagnostic ==
Clinical testing in patient care for Jr(a) antigen follows published minimum quality and operational requirements, similar to red cell genotyping for any of the other recognized blood group systems. Molecular analysis can identify gene variants (alleles) that may affect Jr(a) antigen expression on the red cell membrane.

== History ==
The Junior blood group system was discovered in 1970 by researchers Stroup and MacIllroy, who reported on five patients whose blood was incompatible with all samples tested except each other's. They named the causative antigen "JR" after Rose Jacobs, one of the five patients — the common name "Junior" is in fact a misnomer.

In 2012, two research groups independently identified ABCG2 as the basis of the Junior blood group system. The Junior system was officially designated a blood group by the International Society of Blood Transfusion that year.
