= GBGT1 =

Protein-coding gene in the species Homo sapiens

Identifiers
- Aliases: GBGT1, A3GALNT, FS, UNQ2513, globoside alpha-1,3-N-acetylgalactosaminyltransferase 1, globoside alpha-1,3-N-acetylgalactosaminyltransferase 1 (FORS blood group)
- External IDs: OMIM: 606074; MGI: 2449143; GeneCards: GBGT1

Gene location (Human)
Chr.	Chromosome 9 (human)
Band	9q34.2	Start	133,152,948 bp
Band	9q34.2	End	133,163,933 bp

Gene location (Mouse)
Chr.	Chromosome 2 (mouse)
Band	2|2 A3	Start	28,386,903 bp
Band	2|2 A3	End	28,395,427 bp
RNA expression pattern
Bgee	Human / Mouse (ortholog); Top expressed in: body of stomach; monocyte; blood; right ovary; left ovary; granulocyte; right adrenal gland; right adrenal cortex; apex of heart; left adrenal gland / Top expressed in: embryo; embryo; blastocyst; muscle of thigh; esophagus; morula; spermatocyte; spermatid; lip; dentate gyrus of hippocampal formation granule cell; More reference expression data
BioGPS	n/a
Gene ontology
Molecular function	transferase activity; hexosyltransferase activity; metal ion binding; glycosyltransferase activity; globoside alpha-N-acetylgalactosaminyltransferase activity
Cellular component	integral component of membrane; Golgi membrane; membrane; Golgi apparatus; vesicle
Biological process	glycolipid biosynthetic process; protein glycosylation; lipid glycosylation; carbohydrate metabolic process
Sources:Amigo / QuickGO
Orthologs
Databases	NCBI: entry; OMA: entry
Species	Human	Mouse
Entrez	26301	227671
Ensembl	ENSG00000148288	ENSMUSG00000026829
UniProt	Q8N5D6	Q8VI38
RefSeq (mRNA)	NM_021996; NM_001282629; NM_001282632; NM_001288572; NM_001288573	NM_139197
RefSeq (protein)	NP_001269558; NP_001269561; NP_001275501; NP_001275502; NP_068836	NP_631936
Location (UCSC)	Chr 9: 133.15 – 133.16 Mb	Chr 2: 28.39 – 28.4 Mb
PubMed search
- Wikidata
View/Edit Human	View/Edit Mouse

Globoside alpha-1,3-N-acetylgalactosaminyltransferase 1 is an enzyme that in humans is encoded by the GBGT1 gene.

This gene encodes a member of the histo-blood group ABO gene family that encodes glycosyltransferases with related but distinct substrate specificity. This protein plays a role in synthesizing Forssman glycolipid (FG), a member of the globoseries glycolipid family. Human cells do not normally produce FG but produce the precursor glycolipids globotriaosylceramide and globoside. This protein may be involved in the tropism and binding of pathogenic organisms.
