= Acute hemolytic transfusion reaction =

Complication of blood transfusion

- Other names: Immediate hemolytic transfusion reaction
- Specialty: Hematology
- Symptoms: Fever, chills, pain, nausea, shortness of breath
- Complications: Low blood pressure, hemoglobinuria, shock, disseminated intravascular coagulation
- Usual onset: Within 24 hours

An acute hemolytic transfusion reaction (AHTR), also called immediate hemolytic transfusion reaction, is a life-threatening reaction to receiving a blood transfusion. AHTRs occur within 24 hours of the transfusion and can be triggered by a few milliliters of blood. The reaction is triggered by host antibodies destroying donor red blood cells. AHTR typically occurs when there is an ABO blood group incompatibility, and is most severe when type A donor blood is given to a type O recipient.

== Signs and symptoms ==
Early acute hemolytic transfusion reactions are typically characterized by fever, which may be accompanied by rigors (chills). Mild cases are also typically characterized by abdominal, back, flank, or chest pain. More severe cases may be characterized by shortness of breath, low blood pressure, hemoglobinuria, and may progress to shock and disseminated intravascular coagulation. In anesthetized or unconscious patients, hematuria (blood in the urine) may be the first sign of AHTR. Other symptoms include nausea, vomiting, and wheezing.

== Causes ==
The most common cause of acute hemolytic transfusion reaction is ABO incompatibility, which is typically due to human error that results in a recipient receiving the incorrect blood product. Rarely, other blood type incompatibilities can cause AHTR, the most common of which is Kidd antigen incompatibility. Rh, Kell, and Duffy antigen incompatibility have also been implicated in AHTR.

== Mechanism ==
Acute hemolytic transfusion reactions result when antibodies against A and/or B antigens (isohemagglutinins) present in the recipient's blood destroy the respective donor red blood cells. This is mediated through the antibodies IgM (and to a lesser extent IgG) which cause activation of the complement cascade, with complement C5-C9 forming the membrane attack complex which leads to pore formation and red blood cell lysis. The lysed red blood cells release free hemoglobin into the bloodstream, overwhelming hemoglobin binding proteins such as albumin, haptoglobin, and hemopexin, with the excess free hemoglobin leading to renal vasoconstriction (via nitric oxide scavenging), which then leads to acute tubular necrosis and acute kidney injury.

The antibodies also activate the coagulation cascade (blood clotting system) via factor XII, which can lead to disseminated intravascular coagulation and kidney damage. Isohemagglutinins also activate the complement cascade via C3a and C5a, which then promote inflammatory cytokine release from white blood cells. C3a and C5a also activate mast cells which release serotonin and histamine, which along with fragments of red blood cells that were destroyed, further stimulate the release of inflammatory cytokines. These inflammatory cytokines include IL-1, IL-6, IL-8, and TNF-alpha, which cause increased capillary permeability and vasodilation leading to symptoms of low blood pressure, fever, chest pain, nausea, vomiting, and wheezing.

== Diagnosis ==
The diagnosis of AHTR is made with microscopic examination of the recipient's blood and a direct antiglobulin test (direct Coombs test) which detects IgG antibodies or complement bound to red blood cells and is usually diagnostic of acute hemolytic transfusion reactions. The donor and recipient blood can be re-tested with a type, crossmatch, and antibody screen to determine the cause of the reaction. The donor blood should be examined for any labelling error or other possible errors from the blood bank, which may help prevent other mislabeled blood products from being distributed. Testing the donor blood using a gram stain and blood culture can also help to rule out an infectious cause of the symptoms (such as the donor receiving infected blood). Testing for urine or plasma free hemoglobin may also assist in the diagnosis.

== Treatment ==
Initial treatment for any type of transfusion reaction, including AHTR, is discontinuation of the transfusion. Fluid replacement and close monitoring of vital signs are important. People with AHTR are managed with supportive care, which may include diuretics, blood pressure support, and treatment of disseminated intravascular coagulation (with fresh frozen plasma, cryoprecipitate, and platelet transfusion). The use of steroids, intravenous immune-globulins (IVIG) or plasma exchange is not supported by evidence. Furosemide is the diuretic of choice in treatment of AHTR with decreased urine output, because it increases the amount of blood that reaches the renal cortex. Mannitol may also be used. Dopamine is used for blood pressure support because it causes vasodilation (dilation of blood vessels) in the kidneys as well as increasing the cardiac output (amount of blood pumped by the heart each minute).

== Prognosis ==
The severity and prognosis of acute hemolytic transfusion depends on the rate of blood administration and the total volume of the transfusion. The levels of anti-A and anti-B antibodies in the recipients blood may also predict the prognosis, with higher levels of antibodies thought to portend a more severe course. Approximately 2% of cases are fatal. Reactions that begin sooner are typically more severe.

== Epidemiology ==
Acute hemolytic transfusion reaction is estimated to occur in 1 in 38,000 to 1 in 70,000 transfusions. An estimated 41% of ABO-incompatible transfusions result in AHTR.
