= International Society of Blood Transfusion =

Scientific society promoting study of and awareness about blood transfusion

ISBT (International Society of Blood Transfusion)
- Formation: 1935
- Location: Worldwide
- Members: Approximately 1500
- President: Pierre Tiberghien (present)
- President Elect: Lin Fung
- Past President: Michael Busch (2022-2024)
- Executive Director: Jenny White
- Website: www.isbtweb.org

The International Society of Blood Transfusion (ISBT) is a scientific society founded in 1935 which promotes the study of blood transfusion and provides information about the ways in which blood transfusion medicine and science can best serve patients' interests. The society's central office is in Amsterdam, and there are around 1900 members in 103 countries. As of June 2024, the president of the ISBT is Pierre Tiberghien.

ISBT is governed by a voluntary board of 16 directors, representing all WHO regions. ISBT has 16 scientific working parties, which are groups of ISBT members promoting science, research and best practice in their specific areas of expertise.

ISBT advocates for standardisation and harmonisation in the field of blood transfusion. The other major impact on the transfusion community is the classification of various human blood group systems under a common nomenclature. ISBT's coordination also extends to obtaining donors with rare antigens, a process that often involves international searches in which common terminology is critical.

The ISBT Code of Ethics was developed in response to the World Health Assembly resolution WHA 28.72. This resolution called for the establishment of: appropriately governed national blood services; voluntary non-remunerated blood donations (VNRBD); and the promotion of the health of both blood donors and recipients of blood. ISBT works as a non-state actor in official relations with WHO. ISBT collaborated with WHO to produce "Educational modules on clinical use of blood".

== History ==
In a 2015 review of the history of the ISBT, Hans Erik Heier distinguished four phases in the formation of the society:

- Formation and development (1935 – 1985)
- Years of crisis (1985 – 2000)
- Reformation (2000 – 2010)
- A professional organisation (2010 – present)

The formation of the International Society of Blood Transfusion, or Société Internationale de Transfusion Sanguine, as it was called at the time, was initiated in Rome at a meeting between representatives from 20 nations, the International Red Cross and the Bogdanov institute in Moscow. Blood transfusion was a rather new therapeutic option, and therefore, it was decided that transfusion-specific congresses should be organised to highlight the potential importance of transfusion. To organize these congresses, a society was needed.

After it was decided that a society dedicated to organizing transfusion-related congresses should be created, it did not take long until ISBT was founded. In 1937, the ISBT central office (CO) was established in Paris, led by newly appointed Secretary General Arnault Tzanck. Two years later, in 1939, the activities of the ISBT CO had to be suspended because of the Second World War (WWII).

In the period surrounding WWII, immunohaematology and transfusion technology developed rapidly. Blood banks were created, voluntary blood donations came in great numbers in the allied nations, plasma-transfusion became a standard anti-shock treatment, Rh and Kell systems were discovered, and industrial blood plasma fractionation was developed to produce albumin, which can be used as a substitute for plasma. In 1947, the first post-war congress of the ISBT was organised in Turin, Italy. Here, some specific future goals were laid out to complement the main activity of the Society, the organization of congresses:

- Non-commercialisation of blood and derivatives
- Oversight and initiation of standardisation of equipment, reagents and nomenclature
- Stimulation of the establishment of central transfusion organisations for every country, under the flag of the National Red Cross Society, unless otherwise organised

After the congress in Turin, the society was able to organise congresses and develop without great difficulties for the next forty years, until 1985.

In 1985, the HIV/AIDS epidemic struck transfusion medicine. During that time, the ISBT CO was still located in Paris as a part of the Centre National de Transfusion Sanguine (CNTS) (English: National Centre for Blood Transfusion) as their head, Michel Garretta, was also ISBT Secretary General at the time. In June 1991, he stepped down as head of CNTS, as the HIV/AIDS crisis had become a catastrophe for the transfusion system in France and eventually led to a reorganisation of CNTS in 1991. Subsequently, at the ISBT Congress in Hong Kong it was decided that ISBT could no longer be linked to CNTS, ruling out Garretta's succession of a French colleague. Harold Gunson, who was President of ISBT in 1991, agreed to take on a second role as acting Secretary General. Together with CNTS, and ISBT Secretary Claudine Hossenlopp, he supervised the move of the CO from Paris to Manchester, UK. In 1994, he resigned from his post as blood centre director in Manchester and moved the CO to Lancaster, into his own home. He upheld the CO together with his wife until 1999. The end of Gunson's term meant having to find a new location for the CO, and a new Secretary General.

In 1999, the new location for the ISBT CO was Amsterdam, where it became a part of professional congress organiser (PCO) Eurocongress. Paul Strengers, a doctor at Sanquin Blood Supply, took up the role of Secretary General. A new vision for the 2002–2006 period of ISBT was created by the executive committee, focusing on developing ISBT into an umbrella organization, improving communication with the membership, educational and scientific activities, and professionalizing the CO. In the coming ten years, the society worked to achieve these goals, with Strengers to remain Secretary General for that period. Eurocongress organised ISBT congresses together with the ISBT CO and local organizing committees. The help of Eurocongress took away economic risks attached to congresses, as they were able to provide professional assistance and detailed advice. As the CO had moved to a different country, the ISBT statutes and by-laws were also updated and adapted to Dutch law.

The reformations made in the previous years had led to an increase in workload for the ISBT CO. In order to continue the fulfilment of the strategic plans of the ISBT, a full-time, paid chief executive officer (CEO) was hired in 2010. In 2012, the CO moved to a separate location in Amsterdam as the shared space with Eurocongress did not meet the needs of the expanded office staff. Currently, there are eight employees at the Central Office in Amsterdam, managed by CEO Jenny White (2020 – to date). Congresses are organised by MCI, of which Eurocongress became a part in 2010. In that same year, Martin Olsson was appointed as Scientific Secretary (non-remunerated) to overlook the scientific programming of ISBT congresses and guarantee the high scientific quality. The second Scientific Secretary, Ellen van der Schoot, was in office until 2018. John Semple succeeded Ellen van der Schoot in 2019 through 2021. As of 2024, Jason Ackers is the current ISBT Scientific Secretary until 2026.

== See also ==
- ISBT 128
- World Blood Donor Day
