= Blood group genotyping =

Laboratory process

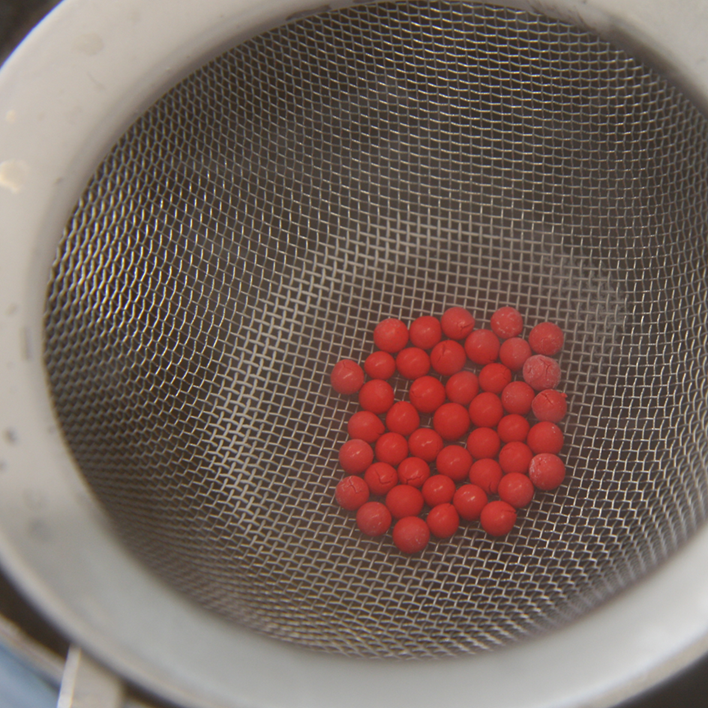
Droplets of frozen red cells in liquid nitrogen vapor.

Since genes encoding blood group antigens began to be identified in 1989, molecular techniques have been used to detect genetic variants responsible for antigens expressed on the surface of red blood cells (RBCs, or red cells). These antigens form the (molecular) basis of blood types. Genotyping has greatly reduced the cost of extended blood typing beyond ABO and RhD, such as C, E, and K, and has increased the wide adoption of extended antigen matching in transfusion medicine. Clinical testing for red cell antigens in patient care follows published minimum quality and operational requirements. Molecular analysis can identify gene variants, or alleles, that may affect the expression of blood group antigens on the surface of the red cell membrane.

== Background ==
Unlike traditional serological testing, which relies on antibodies to detect antigens on the cells, genotyping analyzes DNA to determine an individual's blood group profile with high accuracy. This approach is particularly valuable in complex transfusion cases, such as in patients with multiple alloantibodies, hemoglobinopathies, or recent transfusions that can obscure serological results. Red cell genotyping enhances transfusion safety by enabling precise donor-recipient matching, reducing the risk of alloimmunization, and improving outcomes for patients requiring chronic transfusions, such as sickle cell disease and thalassemia.

The molecular testing of red cell antigens is often handled in conjunction with platelet and neutrophil antigens by professional organizations, such as the International Society of Blood Transfusion (ISBT) and the Association for the Advancement of Blood & Biotherapies (AABB).

== Disambiguation ==
As of June 2026, the terms "blood group genotyping", "red cell genotyping" and "RBC genotyping" have been used in 2,875, 808, and 155 PubMed-indexed publications, respectively.

Blood group genotyping, is the molecular analysis of genetic variants, or alleles, that determine the expression of blood group antigens on red blood cells.

Red cell genotyping, encompasses the term "blood group genotyping" because red cell genotyping includes all antigens found on the red cell membrane, not just those officially recognized as blood group antigens and may include other phenotypes or structural features expressed by red cells.

RBC genotyping is sometimes used, because the red blood cell is abbreviated as RBC. However, RBC genotyping has also been used synonymously for blood group genotyping.

== Method ==
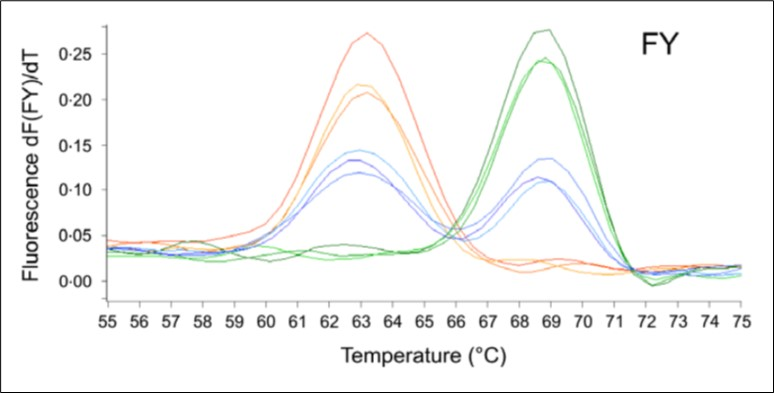
Red cell genotyping by real-time PCR: Duffy blood group system (FY) genotyping showing the melting peaks at 63°C for 3 homozygous Fy(a−b+) samples (orange), 69°C for 3 homozygous Fy(a+b−) samples (green), and 3 heterozygous Fy(a+b+) samples (blue).

Blood group genotyping starts with DNA extracted from anticoagulated whole blood – after all, mature mammal red blood cells do not have a cell nucleus containing the DNA that determines the blood type. The whole blood DNA contains many copies of the entire genomes of the donor/patient, mainly in the white blood cells.

Traditionally, genotyping is done by using polymerase chain reaction to amplify a region of interest, and then by using a restriction enzyme – enzymes known to cut DNA only at a specific sequence – to test for whether a sequence is present. Each locus requires at least one such process, making the process laborious and costly. The newer DNA microarrays are designed to do many similar reactions on DNA at the same time, using different "probes"; this makes them ideally suited for obtaining a large number of genotypes at the same time.

As an alternative to microarrays, the newer next-generation sequencing approach sequences the entire genome or exome of the sample, which allows for genotyping all loci at the same time while resolving not only single nucleotide variants, but also structural variants (deletions, duplications, DNA rearrangements, copy number changes).

=== Fetal ===
It is overly invasive to sample fetal blood, but other sources of fetal DNA could be used for genotyping. This DNA can be obtained using amniocentesis or chorionic villus sampling, though both are still invasive and can lead to miscarriage or fetal hemorrhage in case of a RhD^{-} mother: the main indication for fetal blood group genotyping, as knowing whether the fetus is RhD^{+} informs management of hemolytic disease of the newborn. A safer method is by extracting fetal cell-free DNA from maternal plasma.

== Blood group antigens and blood group systems ==
Blood group genotyping refers to the analysis of the carefully defined blood group antigens that are presented on the red cell membrane. These antigens are caused by

1. proteins integrated in the membrane,
2. carbohydrate components of glycoproteins and glycolipids,
3. proteins anchored via the Glycosylphosphatidylinositol (GPI)-linker,
4. variants of the GPI-linker itself.

As of June 2025, a total of 398 red cell antigens have been officially recognized by the ISBT. Of these, 371 antigens are organized into 48 distinct human blood group systems. Each "system" includes one or more antigens controlled by a single gene locus or by a number of closely linked loci. These antigens can be tested by genotyping, though the exact number of variants tested for depends on the lab performing the genotyping.

The remaining 27 serologically defined antigens have not yet been assigned to a blood group system. These include:

- The 200 series (the Collections) contains 9 antigens that are biochemically, genetically or serologically similar, but whose genetic basis has not yet been discovered.
- The 700 Series contains 16 antigens that do not fit into any system or collection and have an incidence of less than 1% across all human ethnic populations.
- The 901 Series contains 2 antigens that also cannot be included in any system or collection and have an incidence of more than 90% across all human ethnic populations.

As genetic knowledge expanded, many previously undefined antigens of the 200, 700 and 901 series became recategorized into the known or newly defined blood group systems.

== See also ==
- Blood type
- Blood transfusion
- Blood compatibility testing
- ABO blood group system
- Rh factor testing
