= Major intrinsic proteins =

Major intrinsic protein
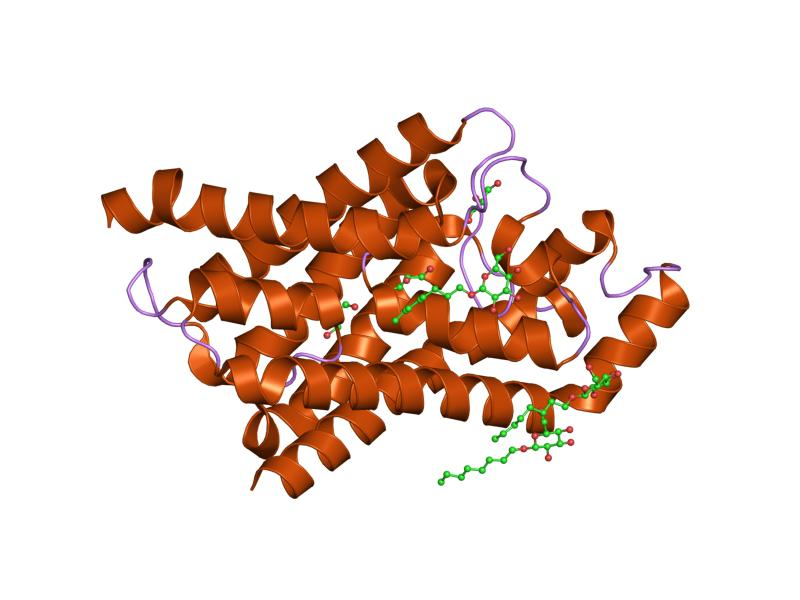
- Structure of a glycerol-conducting channel.

Identifiers
- Symbol: MIP
- Pfam: PF00230
- InterPro: IPR000425
- PROSITE: PDOC00193
- SCOP2: 1fx8 / SCOPe / SUPFAM
- TCDB: 1.A.8
- OPM superfamily: 7
- OPM protein: 1z98
- CDD: cd00333
Available protein structures:
- PDB: IPR000425 PF00230 (ECOD; PDBsum)
- AlphaFold: IPR000425; PF00230

Major intrinsic proteins (MIPs) comprise a large superfamily of transmembrane protein channels that are grouped together on the basis of homology. The MIP superfamily includes three subfamilies: aquaporins, aquaglyceroporins and S-aquaporins.

1. The aquaporins (AQPs) are water selective.
2. The aquaglyceroporins are permeable to water, but also to other small uncharged molecules such as glycerol.
3. The third subfamily, with little conserved amino acid sequences around the NPA boxes, include 'superaquaporins' (S-aquaporins).

The phylogeny of insect MIP family channels has been published.

== Families ==
There are two families that belong to the MIP Superfamily.

- 1.A.8 - The Major Intrinsic Protein (MIP) Family
- 1.A.16 - The Formate-Nitrite Transporter (FNT) Family

=== The Major Intrinsic Protein Family (TC# 1.A.8) ===
The MIP family is large and diverse, possessing thousands of members that form transmembrane channels. These channel proteins function in transporting water, small carbohydrates (e.g., glycerol), urea, NH_{3}, CO_{2}, H_{2}O_{2} and ions by energy-independent mechanisms. For example, the glycerol channel, FPS1p of Saccharomyces cerevisiae mediates uptake of arsenite and antimonite. Ion permeability appears to occur through a pathway different than that used for water/glycerol transport and may involve a channel at the 4 subunit interface rather than the channels through the subunits. MIP family members are found ubiquitously in bacteria, archaea and eukaryotes. Phylogenetic clustering of the proteins is primarily based according to phylum of the organisms of origin, but one or more clusters are observed for each phylogenetic kingdom (plants, animals, yeast, bacteria and archaea). MIPs are classified into five subfamilies in higher plants, including plasma membrane (PIPs), tonoplast (TIPs), NOD26-like (NIPs), small basic (SIPs) and unclassified X (XIPs) intrinsic proteins. One of the plant clusters includes only tonoplast (TIP) proteins, while another includes plasma membrane (PIP) proteins.

==== Major Intrinsic Protein ====
The Major Intrinsic Protein (MIP) of the human lens of the eye (Aqp0), after which the MIP family was named, represents about 60% of the protein in the lens cell. In the native form, it is an aquaporin (AQP), but during lens development, it becomes proteolytically truncated. The channel, which normally houses 6-9 water molecules, becomes constricted so only three remain, and these are trapped in a closed conformation. These truncated tetramers form intercellular adhesive junctions (head to head), yielding a crystalline array that mediates lens formation with cells tightly packed as required to form a clear lens. Lipids crystallize with the protein. Ion channel activity has been shown for Aquaporins 0, 1, and 6, Drosophila 'Big Brain' (bib) and plant Nodulin-26. Roles of aquaporins in human cancer have been reviewed as have their folding pathways. AQPs may act as transmembrane osmosensors in red cells, secretory granules and microorganisms. MIP superfamily proteins and variations of their selectivity filters have been reviewed.

==== Aquaporin ====
The currently known aquaporins cluster loosely together as do the known glycerol facilitators. MIP family proteins are believed to form aqueous pores that selectively allow passive transport of their solute(s) across the membrane with minimal apparent recognition. Aquaporins selectively transport glycerol as well as water while glycerol facilitators selectively transport glycerol but not water. Some aquaporins can transport NH_{3} and CO_{2}. Glycerol facilitators function as solute nonspecific channels, and may transport glycerol, dihydroxyacetone, propanediol, urea and other small neutral molecules in physiologically important processes. Some members of the family, including the yeast Fps1 protein (TC# 1.A.8.5.1) and tobacco NtTIPa (TC# 1.A.8.10.2) may transport both water and small solutes.

===== Examples =====
A list of nearly 100 currently classified members of the MIP family can be found in the Transporter Classification Database. Some of the MIP family channels include:

- Mammalian major intrinsic protein (MIP). MIP is the major component of lens fibre gap junctions.
- Mammalian aquaporins. (InterPro: IPR012269) These proteins form water-specific channels that provide the plasma membranes of red cells, as well as kidney proximal and collecting tubules with high permeability to water, thereby permitting water to move in the direction of an osmotic gradient.
- Soybean nodulin-26, a major component of the peribacteroid membrane induced during nodulation in legume roots after Rhizobium infection.
- Plant tonoplast intrinsic proteins (TIP). There are various isoforms of TIP : alpha (seed), gamma, Rt (root), and Wsi (water-stress induced). These proteins may allow the diffusion of water, amino acids and/or peptides from the tonoplast interior to the cytoplasm.
- Bacterial glycerol facilitator protein (gene glpF), which facilitates the movement of glycerol non-specifically across the cytoplasmic membrane.
- Salmonella typhimurium propanediol diffusion facilitator (gene pduF).
- Yeast FPS1, a glycerol uptake/efflux facilitator protein.
- Drosophila neurogenic protein 'big brain' (bib). This protein may mediate intercellular communication; it may functions by allowing the transport of certain molecules(s) and thereby sending a signal for an exodermal cell to become an epidermoblast instead of a neuroblast.
- Yeast hypothetical protein YFL054c.
- A hypothetical protein from the pepX region of Lactococcus lactis.

== Structure ==
MIP family channels consist of homotetramers (e.g., GlpF of E. coli; TC #1.A.8.1.1, AqpZ of E. coli; TC #1.A.8.3.1, and MIP or Aqp0 of Bos taurus; TC #1.A.8.8.1). Each subunit spans the membrane six times as putative α-helices. The 6 TMS domains are believed to have arisen from a 3-spanner-encoding genetic element by a tandem, intragenic duplication event. The two halves of the proteins are therefore of opposite orientation in the membrane. A well-conserved region between TMSs 2 and 3 and TMSs 5 and 6 dip into the membrane, each loop forming a half TMS. A common amino acyl motif in these transporters is an asparagine–proline–alanine (NPA) motif. Aquaporins generally have the NPA motif in both halves, the glycerol facilitators generally have an NPA motif in the first haves and a DPA motif in the second halves, and the super-aquaporins have poorly conserved NPA motifs in both halves.

=== Glycerol Uptake Facilitator ===
The crystal structure of the glycerol facilitator of E. coli (TC# 1.A.8.1.1) was solved at 2.2 Å resolution (PDB: 1FX8). Glycerol molecules create a single file within the channel and pass through a narrow selectivity filter. The two conserved D-P-A motifs in the loops between TMSs 2 and 3 and TMSs 5 and 6 form the interface between the two duplicated halves of each subunit. Thus each half of the protein forms 3.5 TMSs surrounding the channel. The structure explains why GlpF is selectively permeable to straight chain carbohydrates, and why water and ions are largely excluded. Aquaporin-1 (AQP1) and the bacterial glycerol facilitator, GlpF can transport O_{2}, CO_{2}, NH_{3}, glycerol, urea, and water to varying degrees. For small solutes passing through AQP1, there is an anti-correlation between permeability and solute hydrophobicity. AQP1 is thus a selective filter for small polar solutes, whereas GlpF is highly permeable to small solutes and less permeable to larger solutes.

=== Aquaporin-1 ===
Aquaporin-1 (Aqp1) from the human red blood cell has been solved by electron crystallography to 3.8 Å resolution (PDB: 1FQY). The aqueous pathway is lined with conserved hydrophobic residues that permit rapid water transport. Water selectivity is due to a constriction of the inner pore diameter to about 3 Å over the span of a single residue, superficially similar to that in the glycerol facilitator of E. coli. Several other more recently resolved crystal structures are available in RCSB, including but not limited to: PDB: 4CSK, 1H6I, 1IH5.

=== Aquaporin-Z ===
AqpZ, a homotetramer (tAqpZ) of four water-conducting channels that facilitate rapid water movements across the plasma membrane of E. coli, has been solved to 3.2 Å resolution (PDB: 2ABM). All channel-lining residues in the four monomeric channels are orientated in nearly identical positions except at the narrowest channel constriction, where the side chain of a conserved Arg-189 adopts two distinct orientations. In one of the four monomers, the guanidino group of Arg-189 points toward the periplasmic vestibule, opening up the constriction to accommodate the binding of a water molecule through a tridentate H-bond. In the other three monomers, the Arg-189 guanidino group bends over to form an H-bond with carbonyl oxygen of Thr-183 occluding the channel. Therefore, the tAqpZ structure has two different Arg-189 conformations which provide water permeation through the channel. Alternating between the two Arg-189 conformations disrupts continuous flow of water, thus regulating the open probability of the water pore. Further, the difference in Arg-189 displacements is correlated with a strong electron density found between the first transmembrane helices of two open channels, suggesting that the observed Arg-189 conformations are stabilized by asymmetrical subunit interactions in tAqpZ. Other resolved crystal structures for AqpZ include: PDB: 3NK5, 3NKC, 1RC2.

=== PIP1 and PIP2 ===
The 3-D structures of the open and closed forms of plant aquaporins, PIP1 and PIP2, have been solved (PDB: 4JC6). In the closed conformation, loop D caps the channel from the cytoplasm and thereby occludes the pore. In the open conformation, loop D is displaced up to 16 Å, and this movement opens a hydrophobic gate blocking the channel entrance from the cytoplasm. These results reveal a molecular gating mechanism which appears conserved throughout all plant plasma membrane aquaporins. In plants it regulates water intake/export in response to water availability and cytoplasmic pH during anoxia.

== Human proteins containing this domain ==
AQP1, AQP2, AQP3, AQP4, AQP5, AQP6, AQP7, AQP8, AQP9, AQP10, MIP

== See also ==
- MIPModDB
- MIP (gene)
- Aquaporins
- Integral membrane protein
- Transporter Classification Database
- Protein Superfamily
- Protein family
