= Reabsorption =

Part of the function of the kidney

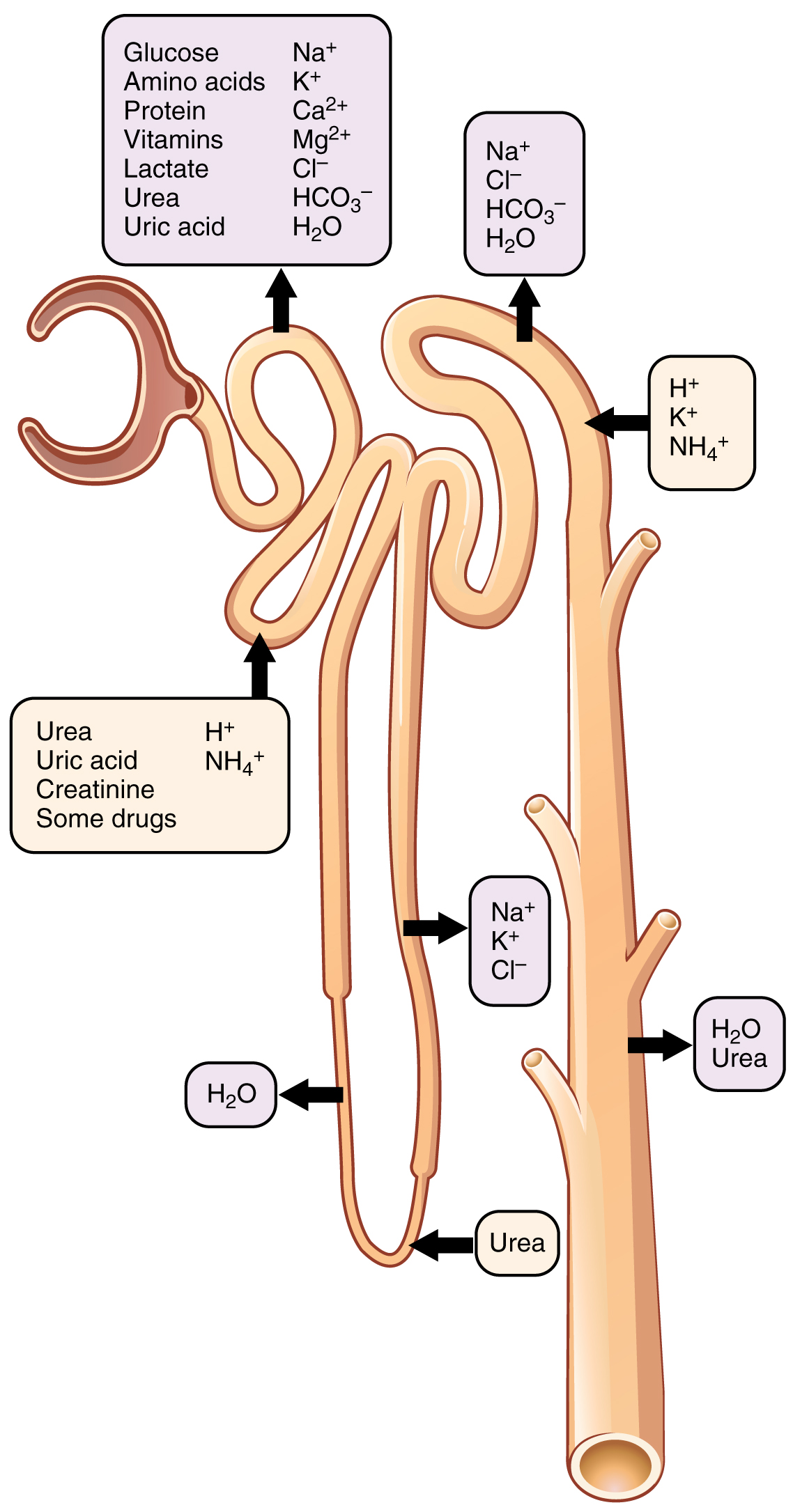
Locations of secretion and reabsorption in the nephron

In renal physiology, reabsorption, more specifically tubular reabsorption, is the process by which the nephron recovers water and solutes from the tubular fluid (pre-urine) and returns them to the circulating blood. It is called reabsorption (and not absorption) because these substances have already been absorbed once from ingested food and water (particularly in the intestines) and the body is reclaiming them from a fluid stream filtered out of blood in the glomeruli that is on its way to becoming urine.

Each day, the kidneys filter about 150 liters of blood, while only about 1.5 liters of urine is actually expelled from the body. Reabsorption thus recovers a large proportion of the water filtered by the kidneys and plays a critical role in maintaining the water balance of the body.

== Mechanism ==
Reabsorption is driven by active sodium transport from the lumen into the blood by the Na^{+}/K^{+}ATPase enzyme in the basolateral membrane of the epithelial cells. The resultant sodium gradient causes water and other solutes in the filtrate to follow the sodium ions into the peritubular capillaries via osmosis.

Renal tubules consist of a proximal tubule, loop of Henle, and distal tubule. These different sections are responsible for reabsorbing different substances, at different rates. Most reabsorption (about 60-70% of sodium and almost all of the glucose and amino acids) occurs in the first section, the proximal convoluted tubule. Glucose, amino acids, inorganic phosphate, and some other solutes are reabsorbed via secondary active transport through cotransport channels driven by the sodium gradient. In this section, solutes are reabsorbed isotonically, as water follows the solutes being transported into the blood, such that the osmotic potential of the fluid leaving the proximal convoluted tubule is the same as that of the initial glomerular filtrate. Further on, absorption is not isotonic, as in the descending section of the loop of Henle, water is absorbed, but not solutes, so the filtrate becomes more concentrated. Finally, the thick ascending limb of the loop of Henle and distal nephron together recover the other 30-40% of sodium and other solutes.

== Renin–angiotensin system ==
The renin–angiotensin system modulates the rate of reabsorption as a part of its role in regulating blood pressure and fluid balance in the body. The system affects reabsoprtion in the following cycle:

1. The kidneys sense low blood pressure.
2. Release renin into the blood.
3. Renin causes production of angiotensin I.
4. Angiotensin-converting enzyme (ACE) converts angiotensin I to angiotensin II.
5. Angiotensin II stimulates the release of aldosterone, ADH, and thirst.
6. Aldosterone causes kidneys to reabsorb sodium; ADH increases the uptake of water.
7. Water follows sodium.
8. As blood volume increases, pressure also increases.

== Bladder Reabsorption ==
The bladder is able to separately reabsorb water and solutes such as drugs. This mechanism is not affected by anticholingeric drugs, unlike renal reabsorption. This mechanism also does not involve ADH. In fully hydrated frogs, the bladder plays a significant role in reabsorbing water and electrolytes. The pig urothelium expresses AQP3, AQP9, and AQP11.

== See also ==
- Transepithelial potential difference driving reabsorption
