= R. Sankararamakrishnan =

Indian computational biologist

- Born: Melmangalam, Theni Dt., Tamil Nadu, India
- Education: Madurai Kamaraj University; Indian Institute of Science; University of Oxford; University of Illinois, Urbana-Champaign
- Known for: Computational studies on membrane protein function
- Awards: 2008 N-BIOS Prize
- Scientific career
- Fields: Computational biology
- Workplaces: Icahn School of Medicine at Mount Sinai; IIT Kanpur

Ramasubbu Sankararamakrishnan is an Indian computational biologist, bioinformatician and a professor at the Department of Biological Sciences and Bioengineering of the Indian Institute of Technology, Kanpur. He is known for his computational studies on membrane protein function. The Department of Biotechnology of the Government of India awarded him the National Bioscience Award for Career Development, one of the highest Indian science awards, for his contributions to biosciences in 2008.

== Biography ==
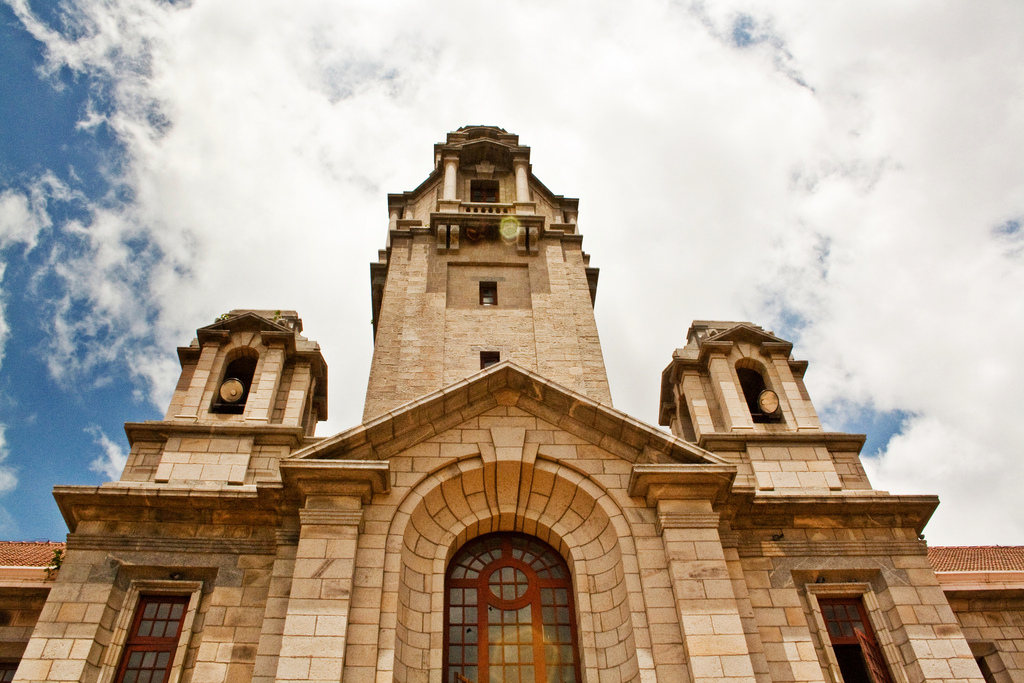
Indian Institute of Science

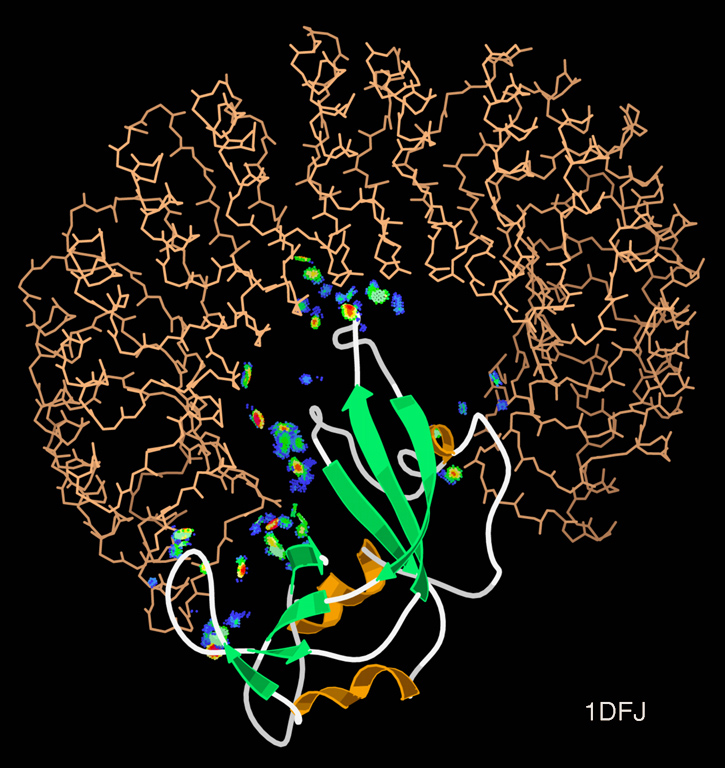
The horseshoe shaped ribonuclease inhibitor (shown as wireframe) forms a protein–protein interaction with the ribonuclease protein

R. Sankararamakrishnan, who completed his early college education at the Madurai Kamaraj University in 1986, did his doctoral studies at the Indian Institute of Science and after obtaining a PhD in 1992, he moved to the UK where he did his post-doctoral research in computational biology at the University of Oxford. He had another stint of post-doctoral work at the University of Illinois, Urbana-Champaign and started his career in 1996 as an instructor (later assistant professor of research) at the Icahn School of Medicine at Mount Sinai. In April 2002, he returned to India to join the Indian Institute of Technology, Kanpur (IITK) as an assistant professor and serves as a professor at the Department of Biological Sciences and Bioengineering (BSBE). Subsequently, he founded the Bioinformatics and Biomolecular Simulation Laboratory at IITK where he hosts several research scholars. He also serves as a resource person for the Centre for Mathematical Biology of the Department of Science and Technology.

== Legacy ==
Sankaramakrishnan's research is focused on mechanism of membrane protein function using computational approaches. He is known to have carried out research on aquaporin genes in plants, Asx turns, molecular dynamic simulations of protein-protein interactions, GPCR peptide hormones as well as nonAUG start codons and AUG codons. His studies have been documented by way of a number of articles (Note: Please see Selected bibliography section) and ResearchGate, an online repository of scientific articles has listed 98 of them. Besides, he has also contributed chapters to books published by others and his articles have drawn many citations. He is the co-author of MIPModDB, a database of structure models of Major intrinsic proteins. He has also delivered invited or keynote speeches at various national and international seminars.

Sankararamakrishnan is a member of the National Network for Mathematical and Computational Biology, an agency funded by the Science and Engineering Research Board of the Government of India for promoting scientific research and advanced training in the discipline. He is also a life member of the National Academy of Sciences, India, one of the three major Indian science academies.

== Awards and honors ==
The Department of Biotechnology of the Government of India awarded him the National Bioscience Award for Career Development, one of the highest Indian science awards in 2008. He has also held the Joy Gill Chair Professorship for Young Faculty and the U.S.V. Chair Professorship of the Indian Institute of Technology, Kanpur during 2007-2010 and 2011-2014 respectively.

== Selected bibliography ==
=== Chapters ===
- International Biometric Society. Indian Region. Conference; R. Sankararamakrishnan (chapter author) (2006). "Pattern Searching in Protein and DNA Sequences". Statistical Advances in Biosciences and Bioinformatics. Allied Publishers. pp. 106–. ISBN 978-81-7764-968-0.

=== Articles ===
- Iyer, Abhishek Hariharan; Krishna Deepak, Rama Nagesh Venkata; Sankararamakrishnan, Ramasubbu (27 December 2017). "Imidazole Nitrogens of Two Histidine Residues Participating in N-H…N Hydrogen Bonds in Protein Structures: Structural Bioinformatics Approach Combined with Quantum Chemical Calculations". The Journal of Physical Chemistry B. 122 (3): 1205–1212. doi:10.1021/acs.jpcb.7b11737. ISSN 1520-6106. PMID 29278913.
- Krishna Deepak, R.N.V.; Chandrakar, Brijesh; Sankararamakrishnan, Ramasubbu (2017). "Comparison of metal-binding strength between methionine and cysteine residues: Implications for the design of metal-binding motifs in proteins". Biophysical Chemistry. 224: 32–39. doi:10.1016/j.bpc.2017.02.007. PMID 28363089.
- Krishna Deepak, R. N. V.; Sankararamakrishnan, Ramasubbu (12 July 2016). "N–H···N Hydrogen Bonds Involving Histidine Imidazole Nitrogen Atoms: A New Structural Role for Histidine Residues in Proteins". Biochemistry. 55 (27): 3774–3783. doi:10.1021/acs.biochem.6b00253. ISSN 0006-2960. PMID 27305350.

== See also ==
- Kozak consensus sequence
- Molecular dynamics
