= FAM177A1 =

Protein-coding gene in the species Homo sapiens

Identifiers
- Aliases: FAM177A1, C14orf24, family with sequence similarity 177 member A1
- External IDs: GeneCards: FAM177A1

Gene location (Human)
Chr.	Chromosome 14 (human)
Band	14q13.2	Start	35,044,907 bp
Band	14q13.2	End	35,113,130 bp
RNA expression pattern
Bgee	Human / Mouse (ortholog); Top expressed in: Achilles tendon; myocardium of left ventricle; left testis; right testis; corpus callosum; C1 segment; mucosa of transverse colon; rectum; right lung; upper lobe of left lung / n/a; More reference expression data
BioGPS	n/a
Orthologs
Databases	NCBI: entry; OMA: entry
Species	Human	Mouse
Entrez	283635	n/a
Ensembl	ENSG00000151327	n/a
UniProt	Q8N128	n/a
RefSeq (mRNA)	NM_173607; NM_001079519; NM_001289022	n/a
RefSeq (protein)	NP_001072987; NP_001275951; NP_775878	n/a
Location (UCSC)	Chr 14: 35.04 – 35.11 Mb	n/a
PubMed search		n/a
- Wikidata
View/Edit Human

== Overview ==
Family with sequence similarity 177 member A1 (FAM177A1) is a protein that in humans is encoded by the FAM177A1 gene, previously known as C14orf24. The other member of this family is FAM177B. It is broadly expressed in throughout the human body such as in immune cells like T and NK cells, brain cells, and reproductive tissues and organs. This wide expression pattern hints a multifunctional role. FAM177A1 is found primarily in vesicles, nucleoplasms, Golgi complexes, and evidence of the blood stream.

Peer-reviewed research shows FAM177A1 plays a role in immune response signaling pathways in the regulation of inflammatory response. FAM177A1 acts as a down regulator of IL-1β-induced signaling by interfering with ubiquitin ligase TRAF6 and Ubc13. This suppresses the activation of NF-kB and reduces the transcription of inflammation inducing proteins. Peer-reviewed data and research highlights the position FAM177A1 plays in immune homeostasis

FAM177A1 has been linked to neurological developmental disorders. These disorders are found in humans as macrocephaly, developmental delay, intellectual disability, seizure, and motor abnormalities. Experimental models show that a deficiency of FAM177A1 in the Golgi apparatus disrupts pathways that regulate programmed cell apoptosis, inflammation, and cell proliferation; cementing FAM177A1's role in neurodevelopment and cellular homeostasis, while also alluding to a connection between immune regulation and developmental processes.

== Gene structure ==
FAM177A1 is found on chromosome 14q13.2 and is composed of roughly 70 kb of DNA. Data collected via RefSeq indicates multiple mRNA splice variants highlighting post-transcriptional diversity. Genomic data across vertebrates shows a similar organization in various mammals with slight variations in some species of fish. This protein is mostly uniform throughout all organisms it is found in.

== Protein structure ==
The human FAM177A1 protein is relatively small consisting of approximately 236 amino acids with a molecular weight of about 26kDa. Structural predictions and analyses indicate that it is lacking transmembrane helices which is on par for an intracellular protein that is potentially secreted into the bloodstream. The compact size and absence of a transmembrane suggest a soluble globular structure which is common in regulatory proteins. The FAM177A1 domain remains largely undefined due to inconsistent research, but we do know that largely consists of simple and flexible regions due to its primary functions. Multiple shorter isoforms including one with a length between 89 and 140 amino acids and another which is approximately 213 amino acids have been discovered in addition to the full length protein. Some isoforms are believed to be secreted thanks to their N-terminal signal peptide while other isoforms are thought to remain intracellular because of the lack of the N-terminal signal peptide.

== Family ==
The FAM177A1 protein belongs to the family with sequence similarity 177 which is generally considered to be poorly categorized as the family consists of protein FAM177A1 and FAM177B on which ample information has not been obtained. Instead, they are grouped together based on their amino acid sequence rather than a well defined biochemical function. However, the family is widely acknowledged to be a conserved protein due to the uniformity of sequences that appear across different species.

== Evolutionary origin ==
FAM177A1 appears to have originated in a common ancestor prior to the diversification of vertebrates, explaining its uniformity across them. The widespread preservation of the protein's structure across many lineages shows the protein is strongly selected for and very likely has a vital role in organisms. However, this does not mean the protein has remained entirely the same; variations in exon numbers and sequence divergence reflects gradual evolution and adaptation specific to species. The existence of FAM177B implies the gene likely came about due to an ancient duplication in which the proteins diverged while still retaining similarities.

== Function ==
FAM177A1 has been linked to immune system regulation and to neurogenesis. It functions as a negative regulator of IL-1β-induced signaling by binding with ubiquitin ligase TRAF6 and disrupting its interaction with the E2 enzyme Ubc13, which is a central pathway in inflammation. This in turn suppresses the activation of NF-kB and reduces the transcription of pro-inflammation proteins in order to prevent excess immune activation FAM177A1 also contributes to various processes involved in cellular homeostasis such as apoptosis, cell production, and cell metabolism. Additionally, FAM177A1 is present in mitochondrial and metabolic signaling pathways which affect oxidative stress and vascular smooth muscle cell behavior. This leads researchers to believe that its function may extend to tissue remodeling under the correct conditions. This multifaceted protein is also utilized in neurodevelopment, with loss-of-function mutations resulting in a syndromic neurodevelopmental disorder characterized by delay in development, intellectual disability, hypotonia, seizures, and motor abnormalities. FAM177A1 has also been linked to neurogenesis and regulation by microRNAs which explains its role in nervous system development, and clinical database evidence further confirms that deletions or harmful variants within the gene which reduce protein expression result in disease which can extend beyond just neurodevelopment. Along with cognitive impairment, symptoms can include abnormal brain imaging, behavioral deviation, muscle tone defects, and progressive motor decline.

== Expression pattern ==
FAM177A1 has a broad, low specificity distribution across human tissues. Large scale transcriptomic datasets indicate that this protein is ubiquitously expressed with significant mRNA levels detected in a variety of organs such as the prostate, colon, brain, and immune related tissues. Despite this proteins broad distribution, it has a notable enrichment pattern associated with testis-related expression clusters and is consistently seen in different regions of the brain: the cerebral cortex, cerebellum, and hippocampus. Because there isn't a strong regional specificity, it is unlikely that the protein is restricted to particular neural cell subtypes.

== Transcript variants and isoforms ==
As a result of alternative splicing, there are three variants of the FAM177A1 gene. These include variant one NM_173607.5, variant two NM_001079519, and variant three NM_001289022.3. Variant two and three differ structurally from variant one in the 5' untranslated region and use a downstream translation initiation codon in addition to having a shortened N terminal region. Variants two and three also encode the same protein isoform (isoform 2). In contrast, variant one encodes protein isoform 1 with an extended N terminus region. Despite these differences, the variants are all functionally the same and only truly differ in protein length. The isoforms, however, are predicted to differ in secretion potential and cellular localization. Some remain cytoplasmic while others are vesicular. The features that define these two types are important for the roles that they play

== Research history ==
The research history of the FAM177A1 protein is fairly recent and encapsulates a broad trend of uncharacterized proteins gradually becoming more studied and linked to biological functions and diseases as sequencing technologies advance. FAM177A1 was originally referred to as C14orf24 in the early 2000s when it was recognized as a conserved protein without much information about it. With limited knowledge, researchers could only assume how this protein functioned until the 2010s. During this time, next generation sequencing was used to identify FAM177A1 and associate it with neurodevelopmental orders; the first time it would ever be associated with disease with a loss of function being the pathogenic mechanism. Later, it was discovered to have a role in the inflammatory pathway.

== Interactions ==
IntAct reports physical interactions between FAM117A1 and these other human proteins:

- Aquaporin-6
- Caspase 6
- DPM3
- ELOVL4
- FATE1
- JAGN1
- LAMP2
- PBX3
- SGPL1
- SH3GLB1
- TMX2
