= Aquaglyceroporins =

Subset of the aquaporin family of proteins

Aquaglyceroporins are recognized as a subset of the aquaporin family of proteins which conduct water, glycerol and other small, uncharged solutes. They are the only mammal proteins which are able to permeate glycerol through the plasma membrane. Aquaglyceroporins are found in many species including bacteria, plants and humans. Because of their ubiquitous nature they are important in agriculture as well as medicine. They have been identified as a possible source of metalloid contamination in agriculture as aquaglyceroporins were have been shown to conduct As(III) and Sb(III) in yeast and could be a possible source of metalloids entering the food sources of humans.

== Clinical Significance ==
Aquaporin-3 has facilitates of glycerol efflux from adipose tissue. Aquaporin-3 has been implicated in certain forms of nonmelanoma skin cancers.

Aquaporin-7 has been the subject of study in adipose tissue as it is a major source of circulating glycerol in the mammalian metabolism. The dysregulation of Aquaporin-7 has been associated with obesity in humans and has been associated with the regulation of adipocyte metabolism.

Aquaporin-9 a major glycerol channel in mouse erythrocytes has been found to contribute to the intraethrocytic stages of malarial infection and the dysfunction of the protein has been found to increase the survival in clinical studies involving mice.

Aquaporin-10 is a glycerol channel and has been found to be highly expressed in the upper gastrointestinal tract and has been implicated as a potential target for treatments for obesity.
