= FNT =

FNT may refer to:

- Bishop International Airport, in Flint, Michigan, United States
- Fascinating New Thing, a single from Semisonic's album Great Divide
- Feniton railway station, a railway station in Devon, England
- Postal code for Fontana, Gozo, Malta
- Forbairt Naíonraí Teoranta, an Irish-language educational organization
- Formate-nitrite transporter
- National Labour Front (Chile) (Spanish: Frente Nacional del Trabajo)
