= Lens fiber major intrinsic protein =

Aquaporin protein in humans

MIP
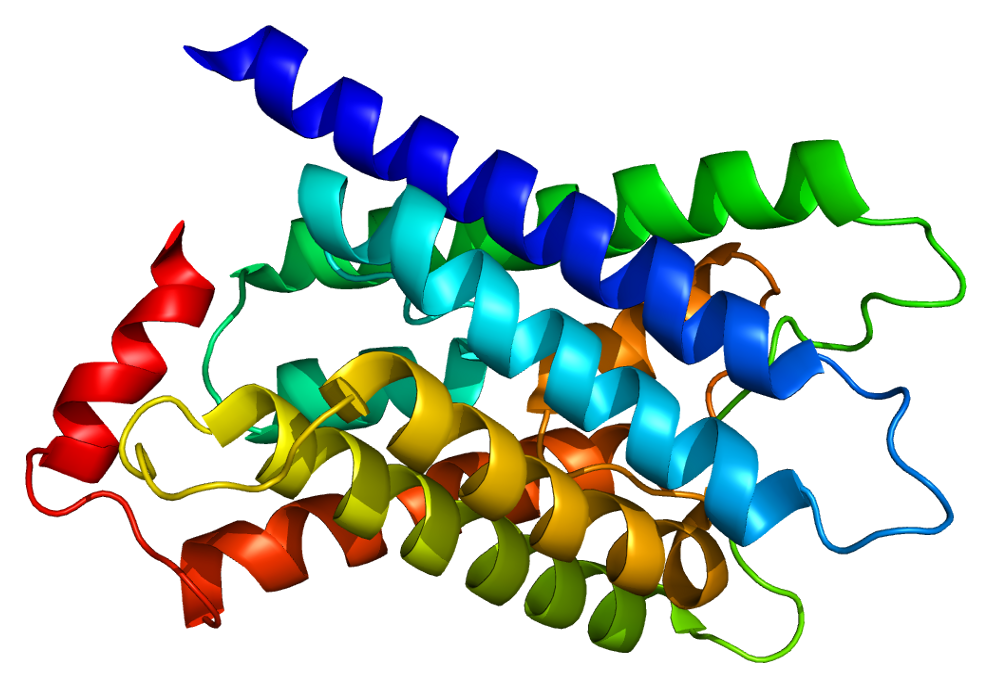

Identifiers
- Aliases: MIP, AQP0, CTRCT15, LIM1, MIP26, MP26, major intrinsic protein of lens fiber
- External IDs: OMIM: 154050; MGI: 96990; GeneCards: MIP

Gene location (Human)
Chr.	Chromosome 12 (human)
Band	12q13.3	Start	56,449,502 bp
Band	12q13.3	End	56,469,166 bp

Gene location (Mouse)
Chr.	Chromosome 10 (mouse)
Band	10 D3|10 76.49 cM	Start	128,061,707 bp
Band	10 D3|10 76.49 cM	End	128,067,681 bp
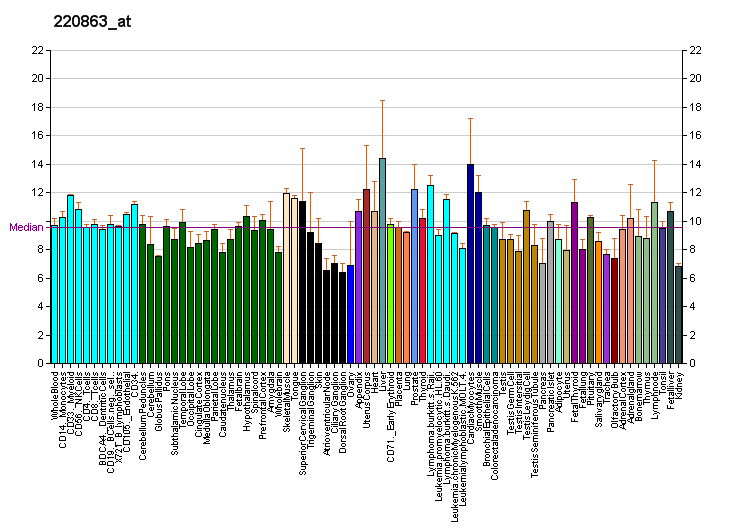
RNA expression pattern
Bgee	Human / Mouse (ortholog); Top expressed in: testicle; gonad; right lobe of liver; apex of heart; right adrenal cortex; right testis; left testis; left adrenal gland; body of pancreas; left adrenal cortex / Top expressed in: lens; epithelium of lens; set of lens fibers; neural layer of retina; ciliary body; embryo; morula; tail of embryo; blastocyst; conjunctival fornix; More reference expression data
BioGPS	More reference expression data
Gene ontology
Molecular function	calmodulin binding; structural constituent of eye lens; water channel activity; channel activity
Cellular component	integral component of membrane; membrane; plasma membrane; cell junction; apical plasma membrane; endoplasmic reticulum; gap junction; integral component of plasma membrane
Biological process	response to stimulus; water transport; ion transmembrane transport; lens development in camera-type eye; protein homotetramerization; visual perception; positive regulation of cell adhesion; gap junction-mediated intercellular transport; transmembrane transport
Sources:Amigo / QuickGO
Orthologs
Databases	NCBI: entry; OMA: entry
Species	Human	Mouse
Entrez	4284	17339
Ensembl	ENSG00000135517	ENSMUSG00000025389
UniProt	P30301	P51180
RefSeq (mRNA)	NM_012064	NM_008600
RefSeq (protein)	NP_036196	NP_032626
Location (UCSC)	Chr 12: 56.45 – 56.47 Mb	Chr 10: 128.06 – 128.07 Mb
PubMed search
- Wikidata
View/Edit Human	View/Edit Mouse

Lens fiber major intrinsic protein also known as aquaporin-0 is a protein that in humans is encoded by the MIP gene.

== Function ==
Major intrinsic protein is a member of the water-transporting aquaporins as well as the original member of the MIP family of channel proteins. The function of the fiber cell membrane protein encoded by this gene is undetermined, yet this protein is speculated to play a role in intracellular communication. The MIP protein is expressed in the ocular lens and is required for correct lens function. This gene has been mapped among aquaporins AQP2, AQP5, and AQP6, in a potential gene cluster at 12q13.
