= Ralf Kaldenhoff =

German botanist

- Known for: Aquaporins
- Scientific career
- Fields: Botany
- Workplaces: Technische Universität Darmstadt

Ralf Kaldenhoff (born 2 October 1958) is a German botanist and professor for applied plant sciences at the Technische Universität Darmstadt. He is known for his work on the aquaporin protein class, where he detected facilitated diffusion of CO_{2} in plant tissue and cells and in chloroplasts respectively.

== Life ==
Rald Kaldenhoff studied biology at the University of Hannover. In 1986 he received a PhD for his work on the thesis Genexpression during the Initial Phase of Blue Light Dependent Chloroplast Differentiation. From 1989-91 Kaldenhoff held a Max-Planck fellowship working at the Max Planck Institute for Molecular Genetics in Berlin. In 1991 he was appointed assistant professor at the University of Hannover. In 1996 he changed to the Julius-von-Sachs-Institute for Biosciences at the University of Würzburg as a full professor in molecular plant physiology. In 2003 he received a call to the Technical University of Darmstadt. Here he is head of the section Applied Plant Sciences since then.

== Scientific contribution ==
Kaldenhoff was one of the first scientists to describe plant aquaporins. He initially accomplished to analyse the function and localization of these proteins in plants as components of facilitated cellular water diffusion and also proved their existence in plant tissues. Pioneering was Kaldenhoff’s discovery that under investigation some of the aquaporin proteins facilitate the diffusion of CO_{2} in plant tissues and cells and in chloroplasts respectively. This detection revealed a yet unknown component of the photosynthesis mechanism. The fact that a protein could facilitate gas diffusion changed the model of gas diffusion in all organisms. For the first time, Kaldenhoff could provide evidence that an aquaporin molecule could conduct CO_{2}. Kaldenhoff also worked on the interaction of parasitic plants with hosts and studied respective molecular mechanisms. This knowledge could be transferred into an application used for antagonizing these parasites. Currently Kaldenhoff and coworkers are developing procedures to cultivate micro algae in large-scale facilities for production of proteins, fatty acids, vitamins and natural ingredients for different industries. To explore basic scientific knowledge and transfer this information in applications useful for human life is the aim of Kaldenhoff’s work. Kaldenhoff published more than 80 papers including five patents.

== International sojourns ==
- 1994 The Ohio State University, Columbus, USA: visiting scientist, Labor Prof. R. Hangarter.
- 1995 Osaka City University, Osaka, Japan: Fellowship of Yamada Science Foundation.
