= Aquaporin-6 =

Protein-coding gene in the species Homo sapiens

AQP6

Identifiers
- Aliases: AQP6, AQP2L, KID, aquaporin 6
- External IDs: OMIM: 601383; MGI: 1341204; GeneCards: AQP6
Available structures
PDB	Ortholog search: PDBe RCSB
PDB	List of PDB id codes 1S6E

Gene location (Human)
Chr.	Chromosome 12 (human)
Band	12q13.12	Start	49,967,194 bp
Band	12q13.12	End	49,977,139 bp

Gene location (Mouse)
Chr.	Chromosome 15 (mouse)
Band	15 F1|15 56.13 cM	Start	99,499,281 bp
Band	15 F1|15 56.13 cM	End	99,503,358 bp
RNA expression pattern
Bgee	Human / Mouse (ortholog); Top expressed in: renal medulla; orbitofrontal cortex; kidney tubule; endothelial cell; inferior ganglion of vagus nerve; human kidney; thalamus; subthalamic nucleus; ventral tegmental area; gonad / Top expressed in: cerebellar vermis; lumbar subsegment of spinal cord; lobe of cerebellum; habenula; human kidney; inner renal medulla; right kidney; Transitional epithelium of renal pelvis; embryo; dorsal tegmental nucleus; More reference expression data
BioGPS	n/a
Gene ontology
Molecular function	nitrate transmembrane transporter activity; water channel activity; channel activity
Cellular component	integral component of membrane; cytoplasmic vesicle; integral component of plasma membrane; apical plasma membrane; membrane; cytoplasmic vesicle membrane; plasma membrane
Biological process	nitrate transport; excretion; odontogenesis; ion transmembrane transport; transmembrane transport; water transport
Sources:Amigo / QuickGO
Orthologs
Databases	NCBI: entry; OMA: entry
Species	Human	Mouse
Entrez	363	11831
Ensembl	ENSG00000086159	ENSMUSG00000043144
UniProt	Q13520	Q8C4A0
RefSeq (mRNA)	NM_053286; NM_001652	NM_175087
RefSeq (protein)	NP_001643	NP_780296
Location (UCSC)	Chr 12: 49.97 – 49.98 Mb	Chr 15: 99.5 – 99.5 Mb
PubMed search
- Wikidata
View/Edit Human	View/Edit Mouse

Aquaporin-6, (AQP-6) also known as kidney-specific aquaporin is a protein in humans that is encoded by the AQP6 gene.

The protein encoded by this gene is an aquaporin protein, which functions as a water channel in cells. Aquaporins are a family of small integral membrane proteins related to the major intrinsic protein (MIP or AQP0). This protein is specific for the kidney. This gene and related family members AQP0, AQP2, and AQP5 reside in a cluster on chromosome 12q13.
