= FAM177B =

Protein found in humans

Identifiers
- Aliases: FAM177B, family with sequence similarity 177 member B
- External IDs: GeneCards: FAM177B

Gene location (Human)
Chr.	Chromosome 1 (human)
Band	1q41	Start	222,737,202 bp
Band	1q41	End	222,751,004 bp
RNA expression pattern
Bgee	Human / Mouse (ortholog); Top expressed in: testicle; gallbladder; rectum; body of stomach; lymph node; appendix; mucosa of transverse colon; gastric mucosa; granulocyte; minor salivary glands / n/a; More reference expression data
BioGPS	n/a
Orthologs
Databases	NCBI: entry; OMA: entry
Species	Human	Mouse
Entrez	400823	n/a
Ensembl	ENSG00000197520	n/a
UniProt	A6PVY3	n/a
RefSeq (mRNA)	NM_207468; NM_001324080; NM_001394345	n/a
RefSeq (protein)	NP_001311009; NP_997351	n/a
Location (UCSC)	Chr 1: 222.74 – 222.75 Mb	n/a
PubMed search		n/a
- Wikidata
View/Edit Human

Family with sequence similarity 177 member B (FAM177B) is a protein that in humans is encoded by the FAM177B gene. The other member of this family is FAM177A1.
