= Aquaporin-8 =

Protein-coding gene in the species Homo sapiens

AQP8

Identifiers
- Aliases: AQP8, AQP-8, aquaporin 8
- External IDs: OMIM: 603750; MGI: 1195271; GeneCards: AQP8

Gene location (Human)
Chr.	Chromosome 16 (human)
Band	16p12.1	Start	25,215,731 bp
Band	16p12.1	End	25,228,932 bp

Gene location (Mouse)
Chr.	Chromosome 7 (mouse)
Band	7 F3|7 67.42 cM	Start	123,061,514 bp
Band	7 F3|7 67.42 cM	End	123,067,227 bp
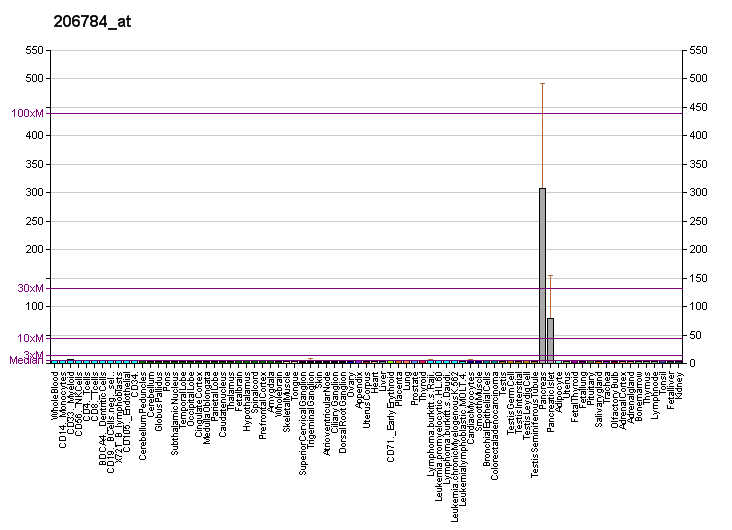
RNA expression pattern
Bgee	Human / Mouse (ortholog); Top expressed in: mucosa of transverse colon; body of pancreas; mucosa of ileum; rectum; mucosa of sigmoid colon; testicle; pancreatic epithelial cell; epithelium of colon; islet of Langerhans; cerebellar hemisphere / Top expressed in: left colon; left lobe of liver; lacrimal gland; spermatocyte; blastocyst; yolk sac; embryo; parotid gland; seminiferous tubule; spermatid; More reference expression data
BioGPS	More reference expression data
Gene ontology
Molecular function	water channel activity; channel activity
Cellular component	integral component of membrane; plasma membrane; apical part of cell; integral component of plasma membrane; membrane; mitochondrion; mitochondrial membranes
Biological process	ion transmembrane transport; cellular response to cAMP; water transport; transmembrane transport
Sources:Amigo / QuickGO
Orthologs
Databases	NCBI: entry; OMA: entry
Species	Human	Mouse
Entrez	343	11833
Ensembl	ENSG00000103375	ENSMUSG00000030762
UniProt	O94778	P56404
RefSeq (mRNA)	NM_001169	NM_001109045; NM_007474
RefSeq (protein)	NP_001160	NP_001102515; NP_031500
Location (UCSC)	Chr 16: 25.22 – 25.23 Mb	Chr 7: 123.06 – 123.07 Mb
PubMed search
- Wikidata
View/Edit Human	View/Edit Mouse

Aquaporin-8 is a protein that in humans is encoded by the AQP8 gene.

Aquaporin-8 (AQP-8) is a water channel protein. Aquaporins are a family of small integral membrane proteins related to the major intrinsic protein (MIP or AQP0). Aquaporin-8 mRNA is found in pancreas and colon but not other tissues.
