= MIPModDB =

Content
- Description: Superfamily of Major intrinsic proteins.

Contact
- Research center: Indian Institute of Technology Kanpur, INDIA
- Laboratory: Department of Biological Sciences and Bioengineering
- Authors: Anjali Bansal Gupta, Ravi Kumar Verma, Vatsal Agarwal, Manu Vajpai, Vivek Bansal, Ramasubbu Sankararamakrishnan
- Primary citation: Gupta et al. (2012)
- Release date: 2011

Access
- Website: http://bioinfo.iitk.ac.in/MIPModDB

MIPModDB is a database of comparative protein structure models of MIP (Major intrinsic proteins) family of proteins.
