= Transmembrane channels =

Transmembrane channels, also called membrane channels, are pores within a lipid bilayer. The channels can be formed by protein complexes that run across the membrane or by peptides. They may cross the cell membrane, connecting the cytosol, or cytoplasm, to the extracellular matrix. Transmembrane channels are also found in the membranes of organelles including the nucleus, the endoplasmic reticulum, the Golgi apparatus, mitochondria, chloroplasts, and lysosomes.

Transmembrane channels differ from transporters and pumps in several ways. Some channels are less selective than typical transporters and pumps, differentiating solutes primarily by size and ionic charge. Channels perform passive transport of materials also known as facilitated diffusion. Transporters can carry out either passive or active transfer of materials while pumps require energy to act.

There are several modes by which membrane channels operate. The most common is the gated channel which requires a trigger, such as a change in membrane potential in voltage-gated channels, to unlock or lock the pore opening. Voltage-gated channels are critical to the production of an action potential in neurons resulting in a nerve impulse. A ligand-gated channel requires a chemical, such as a neurotransmitter, to activate the channel. Stress-gated channels require a mechanical force applied to the channel for opening. Aquaporins are dedicated channels for the movement of water across the hydrophobic interior of the cell membrane.

Ion channels are a type of transmembrane channel responsible for the passive transport of positively charged ions (sodium, potassium, calcium, hydrogen and magnesium) and negatively charged ions (chloride) and, can be either gated or ligand-gated channels. One of the best studied ion channels is the potassium ion channel. The potassium ion channel can allow rapid movement of potassium ions while being selective against sodium. Using X-ray diffraction data and atomic model computations a likely structure of the channel consists of a number of protein alpha-helixes forming an hourglass shaped pore with the narrowest point halfway through the membrane's lipid bilayer. To move through the channel the potassium ions must shed their aqueous matrix and enter a selectivity filter composed of carbonyl oxygens. The potassium ions pass through one atom at a time along five different cation (positively charged ion) binding sites.

Diseases caused by ion channel malfunctions include cystic fibrosis where the channel for the chloride ion will not open or is missing in the cells of the lungs, intestine, pancreas, liver and skin. The cells can no longer regulate salt and water concentrations resulting in the symptoms typical of the disease. Additional disorders resulting from malfunctions in ion channels include forms of epilepsy, cardiac arrhythmia, certain types of periodic paralysis and ataxia.
