= Aquaporin-1 =

Protein-coding gene in the species Homo sapiens

AQP1
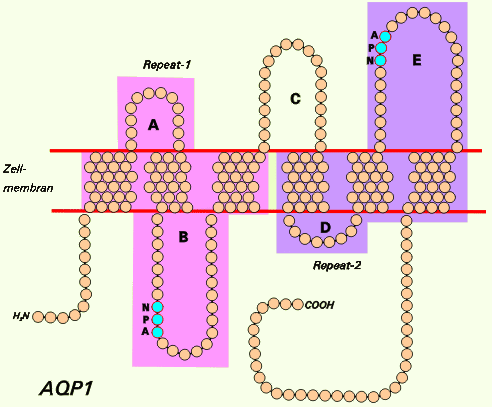

Identifiers
- Aliases: AQP1, AQP-CHIP, CHIP28, CO, aquaporin 1 (Colton blood group)
- External IDs: OMIM: 107776; MGI: 103201; GeneCards: AQP1
Available structures
| PDB | Ortholog search: PDBe RCSB |
| PDB | List of PDB id codes 4CSK, 1FQY, 1H6I, 1IH5 |

Gene location (Human)
| Chr. | Chromosome 7 (human) |
| Band | 7p14.3 | Start | 30,911,853 bp |
| Band | 7p14.3 | End | 30,925,517 bp |

Gene location (Mouse)
| Chr. | Chromosome 6 (mouse) |
| Band | 6 B3|6 27.38 cM | Start | 55,313,417 bp |
| Band | 6 B3|6 27.38 cM | End | 55,325,540 bp |
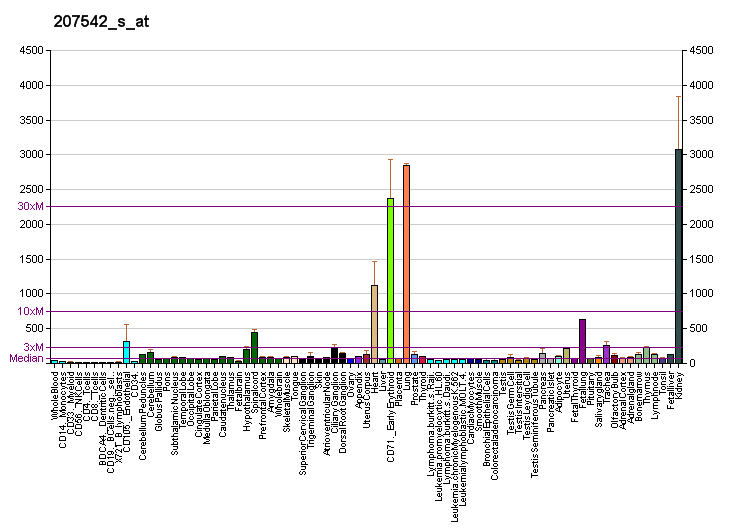

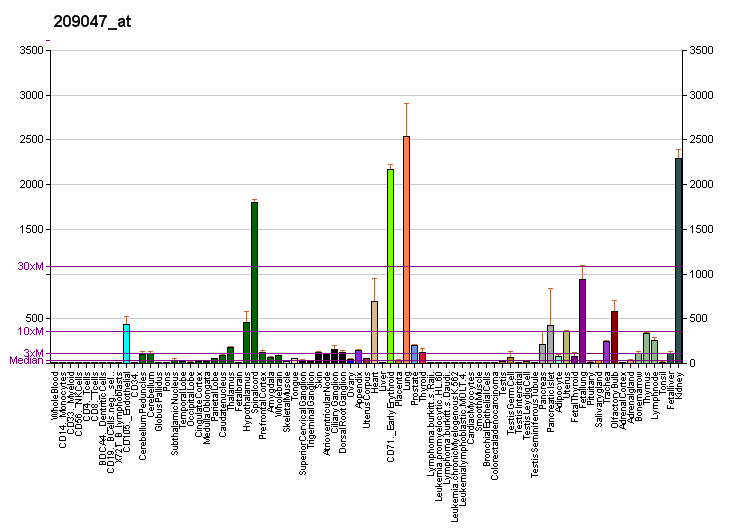
RNA expression pattern
| Bgee | Human / Mouse (ortholog); Top expressed in: Descending thoracic aorta; ascending aorta; right lung; tendon of biceps brachii; upper lobe of left lung; right coronary artery; pericardium; human kidney; apex of heart; lower lobe of lung / Top expressed in: right lung; right lung lobe; tibiofemoral joint; ankle; fourth ventricle; choroid plexus of fourth ventricle; left lung; rib; human kidney; body of femur; More reference expression data |
| BioGPS | More reference expression data |
Gene ontology
| Molecular function | transporter activity; ammonium transmembrane transporter activity; nitric oxide transmembrane transporter activity; intracellular cGMP-activated cation channel activity; potassium channel activity; transmembrane transporter activity; carbon dioxide transmembrane transporter activity; protein binding; water transmembrane transporter activity; potassium ion transmembrane transporter activity; glycerol transmembrane transporter activity; water channel activity; ephrin receptor binding; identical protein binding; channel activity |
| Cellular component | cytoplasm; nuclear membrane; symbiont-containing vacuole membrane; membrane; nucleus; apical plasma membrane; integral component of membrane; plasma membrane; apical part of cell; basal plasma membrane; integral component of plasma membrane; brush border membrane; basolateral plasma membrane; sarcolemma; brush border; symbiont-containing vacuole; axon; neuron projection; axon terminus; extracellular exosome |
| Biological process | cellular response to retinoic acid; cellular response to mechanical stimulus; cellular response to copper ion; cellular response to nitric oxide; cellular response to hypoxia; cellular response to cAMP; carbon dioxide transmembrane transport; positive regulation of fibroblast proliferation; cellular homeostasis; pancreatic juice secretion; cGMP biosynthetic process; cellular response to stress; cellular response to salt stress; cellular response to inorganic substance; cell volume homeostasis; cellular response to UV; establishment or maintenance of actin cytoskeleton polarity; negative regulation of apoptotic process; cellular response to dexamethasone stimulus; positive regulation of angiogenesis; odontogenesis; renal water transport; negative regulation of cysteine-type endopeptidase activity involved in apoptotic process; cellular response to mercury ion; nitric oxide transport; cellular hyperosmotic response; bicarbonate transport; positive regulation of saliva secretion; renal water homeostasis; multicellular organismal water homeostasis; transepithelial water transport; carbon dioxide transport; cellular response to hydrogen peroxide; cerebrospinal fluid secretion; potassium ion transmembrane transport; ammonium transmembrane transport; cation transmembrane transport; glomerular filtration; potassium ion transport; water transport; hyperosmotic response; response to hormone; positive regulation of lamellipodium assembly; positive regulation of epithelial cell migration; glycerol transport; sensory perception of pain; lateral ventricle development; water homeostasis; positive regulation of cell migration; secretion by cell; secretory granule organization; wound healing; hyperosmotic salinity response; response to estrogen; lipid digestion; camera-type eye morphogenesis; corticotropin secretion; renal water absorption; metanephric descending thin limb development; metanephric proximal straight tubule development; metanephric proximal convoluted tubule segment 2 development; metanephric glomerulus vasculature development; transport; cGMP-mediated signaling; ion transmembrane transport; transmembrane transport |
Sources:Amigo / QuickGO
Orthologs
| Databases | NCBI: entry; OMA: entry |
| Species | Human | Mouse |
| Entrez | 358 | 11826 |
| Ensembl | ENSG00000240583 | ENSMUSG00000004655 |
| UniProt | P29972; Q6JSD8; Q6JSD7 | Q02013 |
| RefSeq (mRNA) | NM_198098; NM_000385; NM_001185060; NM_001185061; NM_001185062 NM_001329872 | NM_007472 |
| RefSeq (protein) | NP_001316801; NP_932766 | NP_031498 |
| Location (UCSC) | Chr 7: 30.91 – 30.93 Mb | Chr 6: 55.31 – 55.33 Mb |
| PubMed search |
- Wikidata
| View/Edit Human | View/Edit Mouse |

Aquaporin 1 (AQP-1) is a protein that in humans is encoded by the AQP1 gene.

AQP-1 is a widely expressed water channel, whose physiological function has been most thoroughly characterized in the kidney. It is found in the basolateral and apical plasma membranes of the proximal tubules, the descending limb of the loop of Henle, and in the descending portion of the vasa recta. Additionally, it is found in red blood cells, vascular endothelium, the gastrointestinal tract, sweat glands, lungs, and the central nervous system.

Neural AQP-1 are regulated by vasopressin AVPR1A receptor activity.

== Function ==
Aquaporins are a family of small integral membrane proteins related to the major intrinsic protein (MIP or AQP0). This gene encodes an aquaporin which functions as both a molecular water channel protein and as a non-selective cation channel gated by cyclic guanosine monophosphate (cGMP). It is a homotetramer with six bilayer spanning domains and N-glycosylation sites. The AQP1 monomer consists of six transmembrane alpha helices that are connected by five loops (A to E). The protein physically resembles channel proteins and is abundant in erythrocytes and renal tubes. The gene encoding this aquaporin is a possible candidate for disorders involving imbalance in ocular fluid movement.

== See also ==
- Aquaporin
- Colton antigen system
