= Transepithelial potential difference =

Transepithelial potential difference (TEPD) is the voltage across an epithelium, and is the sum of the membrane potentials for the outer and inner cell membranes.

== TEPD in the nose ==
The diagnosis of cystic fibrosis (CF) is usually based on high chloride concentrations in sweat, characteristic clinical findings (including sinopulmonary infections), and/or family history. However, a small portion of patients with cystic fibrosis, especially those with "mild" mutations of the cystic fibrosis transmembrane regulator (CFTR) ion channel, have near-normal sweat tests.

In these cases, a useful diagnostic adjunct involves measuring the nasal transepithelial potential difference (i.e. the charge on the respiratory epithelial surface as compared to interstitial fluid). Individuals with cystic fibrosis have a significantly more negative nasoepithelial surface than normal, due to increased luminal sodium absorption.

In most exocrine glands, the CFTR protein normally secretes chloride ions into the lumen, and also has a tonic inhibitory effect on the opening of the apical sodium channel (which absorbs sodium into the cell). Impaired CFTR functioning directly reduces ductal epithelial chloride secretion and indirectly increases sodium absorption through lack of CFTR's inhibitory effect on the apical sodium channel. The result is dehydrated mucus and a widened, negative transepithelial potential difference.

The nasal TEPD is increased in cystic fibrosis, making it a potential diagnostic tool for this disorder.

== TEPD in the kidney ==
In the kidney, TEPD contributes to tubular reabsorption.

== TEER measurement ==
Transepithelial / transendothelial electrical resistance (TEER) is an electrophysiological technique widely adopted for use in organ-on-a-chip systems. It uses ohmic contact resistance to serve as a proxy for the permeability of a cellular monolayer. TEER therefore enables researchers to miniaturize assays such as Caco-2 permeability, Blood–brain barrier transfer, or membrane integrity assays in microfluidic systems. TEER has proven to be a highly sensitive and reliable method to confirm the integrity and permeability of in vitro barrier models. Because it is non-invasive and offers the advantage of continuously monitoring living cells throughout their various stages of growth and differentiation, it is widely accepted as a standard validation tool.
