= SH3GLB2 =

Protein-coding gene in the species Homo sapiens

Identifiers
- Aliases: SH3GLB2, PP6569, PP9455, RRIG1, SH3 domain containing GRB2 like endophilin B2, SH3 domain containing GRB2 like, endophilin B2
- External IDs: OMIM: 609288; MGI: 2385131; GeneCards: SH3GLB2

Gene location (Human)
Chr.	Chromosome 9 (human)
Band	9q34.11	Start	129,007,036 bp
Band	9q34.11	End	129,028,331 bp

Gene location (Mouse)
Chr.	Chromosome 2 (mouse)
Band	2|2 B	Start	30,234,821 bp
Band	2|2 B	End	30,249,349 bp
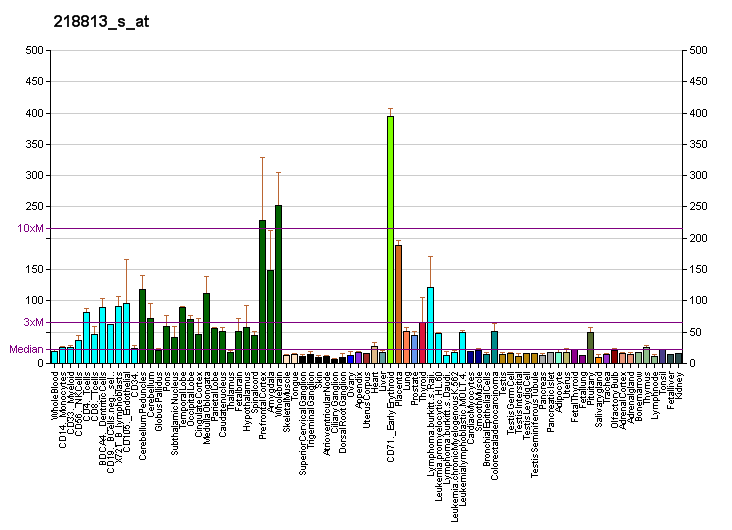
RNA expression pattern
Bgee	Human / Mouse (ortholog); Top expressed in: anterior pituitary; C1 segment; right frontal lobe; skin of abdomen; skin of leg; anterior cingulate cortex; right hemisphere of cerebellum; prefrontal cortex; body of stomach; right uterine tube / Top expressed in: superior frontal gyrus; primary visual cortex; dentate gyrus of hippocampal formation granule cell; cerebellar cortex; interventricular septum; transitional epithelium of urinary bladder; lip; neural layer of retina; central gray substance of midbrain; esophagus; More reference expression data
BioGPS	More reference expression data
Gene ontology
Molecular function	protein binding; identical protein binding; cadherin binding
Cellular component	cytoplasm; nucleoplasm; cytosol
Biological process	cell-cell adhesion
Sources:Amigo / QuickGO
Orthologs
Databases	NCBI: entry; OMA: entry
Species	Human	Mouse
Entrez	56904	227700
Ensembl	ENSG00000148341	ENSMUSG00000026860
UniProt	Q9NR46	Q8R3V5
RefSeq (mRNA)	NM_001287045; NM_001287046; NM_020145; NM_001369913; NM_001369914 NM_001369915	NM_001289709; NM_001289710; NM_139302; NM_001346806; NM_001362888
RefSeq (protein)	NP_001273974; NP_001273975; NP_064530; NP_001356842; NP_001356843 NP_001356844	NP_001276638; NP_001276639; NP_001333735; NP_647463; NP_001349817
Location (UCSC)	Chr 9: 129.01 – 129.03 Mb	Chr 2: 30.23 – 30.25 Mb
PubMed search
- Wikidata
View/Edit Human	View/Edit Mouse

Endophilin-B2 is a protein that in humans is encoded by the SH3GLB2 gene.

== Interactions ==
SH3GLB2 has been shown to interact with SH3GLB1 and SH3KBP1.
