= Formate-nitrite transporter =

Form_Nir_trans

Identifiers
- Symbol: Form_Nir_trans
- Pfam: PF01226
- InterPro: IPR000292
- PROSITE: PDOC00769
- TCDB: 2.A.44
- OPM superfamily: 7
- OPM protein: 3tdp
Available protein structures:
- PDB: IPR000292 PF01226 (ECOD; PDBsum)
- AlphaFold: IPR000292; PF01226

The Formate-Nitrite Transporter (FNT) Family belongs to the Major Intrinsic Protein (MIP) Superfamily. FNT family members have been sequenced from Gram-negative and Gram-positive bacteria, archaea, yeast, plants and lower eukaryotes. The prokaryotic proteins of the FNT family probably function in the transport of the structurally related compounds, formate and nitrite.

== Structure ==
With the exception of the yeast protein (627 amino acyl residues), all characterized members of the family are of 256-285 residues in length and exhibit 6-8 putative transmembrane α-helical spanners (TMSs). In one case, that of the E. coli FocA (TC# 1.A.16.1.1) protein, a 6 TMS topology has been established. The yeast protein has a similar apparent topology but has a large C-terminal hydrophilic extension of about 400 residues.

FocA of E. coli is a symmetric pentamer, with each subunit consisting of six TMSs.

== Phylogeny ==
The phylogenetic tree shows clustering according to function and organismal phylogeny. The putative formate efflux transporters (FocA; TC#s 1.A.16.1.1 and 1.A.16.1.3) of bacteria associated with pyruvate-formate lyase (pfl) comprise cluster I; the putative formate uptake permeases (FdhC; TC#s 1.A.16.2.1 and 1.A.16.2.3) of bacteria and archaea associated with formate dehydrogenase comprise cluster II; the nitrite uptake permeases (NirC, TC#s 1.A.16.2.5, 1.A.16.3.1, and 1.A.16.3.4) of bacteria comprise cluster III, and a yeast protein comprises cluster IV.

== Function ==
The energy coupling mechanisms for proteins of the FNT family have not been extensively characterized. HCO^{−}_{2} and NO^{−}_{2} uptakes may be coupled to H^{+} symport. HCO^{−}_{2} efflux may be driven by the membrane potential by a uniport mechanism or by H^{+} antiport. FocA of E. coli catalyzes bidirectional formate transport and may function by a channel-type mechanism.

FocA, transports short-chain acids. FocA may be able to switch its mode of operation from a passive export channel at high external pH to a secondary active formate/H+ importer at low pH. The crystal structure of Salmonella typhimurium FocA at pH 4.0 shows that this switch involves a major rearrangement of the amino termini of individual protomers in the pentameric channel. The amino-terminal helices open or block transport in a concerted, cooperative action that indicates how FocA is gated in a pH-dependent way. Electrophysiological studies show that the protein acts as a specific formate channel at pH 7.0 and that it closes upon a shift of pH to 5.1.

=== Transport Reaction ===
The probable transport reactions catalyzed by different members of the FNT family are:

(1) RCO^{−}_{2} or NO^{−}_{2} (out) ⇌ RCO^{−}_{2} or NO^{−}_{2} (in),

(2) HCO^{−}_{2} (in) ⇌ HCO^{−}_{2} (out),

(3) HS^{−} (out) ⇌ HS^{−} (in).

== Members ==
A representative list of the currently classified members belonging to the FNT family can be found in the Transporter Classification Database. Some characterized members include:

- FocA and FocB (TC#s 1.A.16.1.1 and 1.A.16.1.2, respectively), from Escherichia coli, transporters involved in the bidirectional transport of formate.
- FdhC, from Methanobacterium maripaludis (TC# 1.A.16.2.3) and Methanothermobacter thermoformicicum (TC# 1.A.16.2.1), a probable formate transporter.
- NirC, from E. coli (TC# 1.A.16.3.1), a probable nitrite transporter.
- Nar1 (TC# 1.A.16.2.4) of Chlamydomonas reinhardtii (Chlamydomonas smithii), a nitrite uptake porter of 355 amino acyl residues.
- B. subtilis hypothetical protein YwcJ (ipa-48R) (TC# 1.A.16.3.2).
