= PBX3 =

Protein found in humans

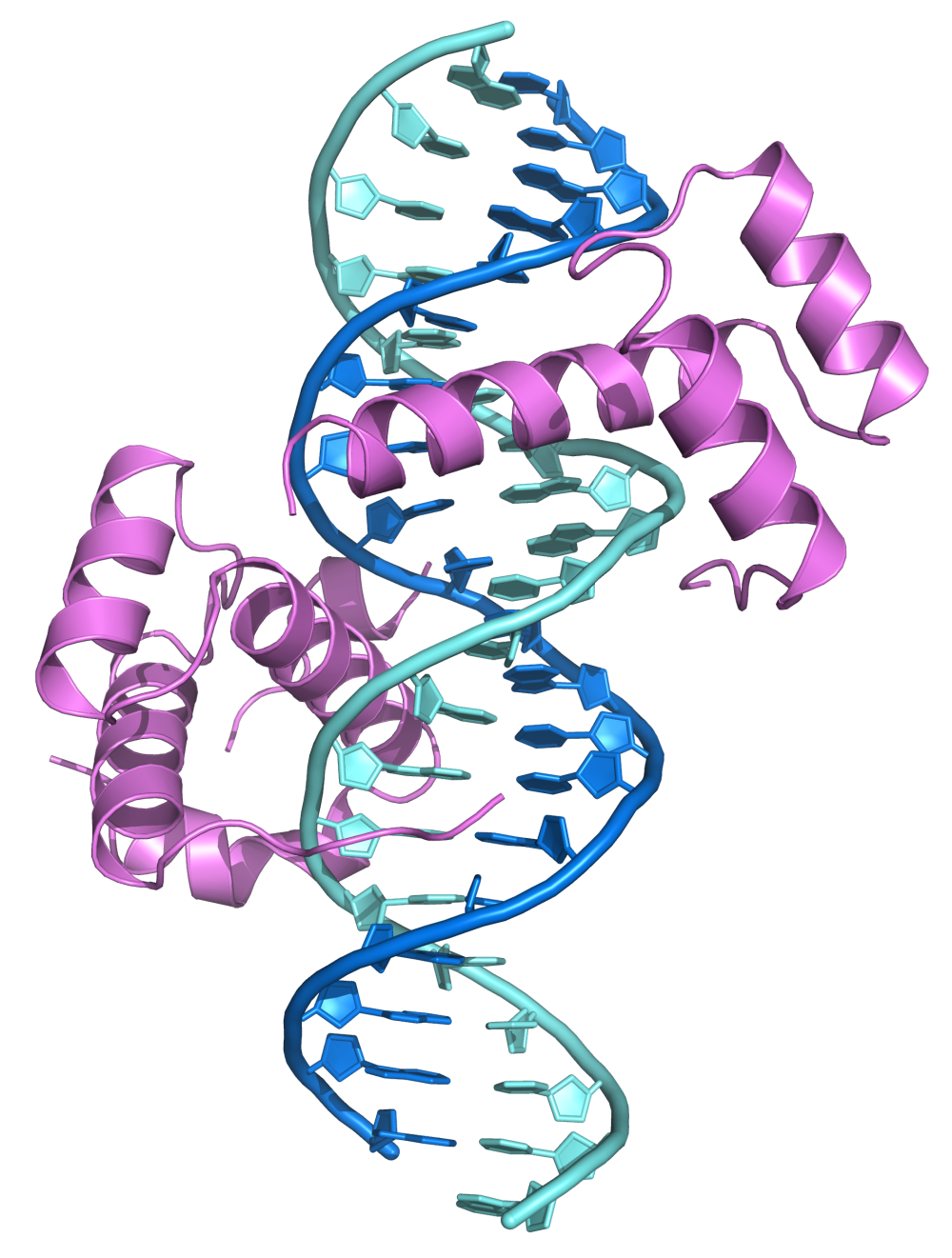

Identifiers
- Aliases: PBX3, PBX homeobox 3
- External IDs: OMIM: 176312; MGI: 97496; GeneCards: PBX3

Gene location (Human)
Chr.	Chromosome 9 (human)
Band	9q33.3	Start	125,747,345 bp
Band	9q33.3	End	125,967,377 bp

Gene location (Mouse)
Chr.	Chromosome 2 (mouse)
Band	2 B|2 22.84 cM	Start	34,061,469 bp
Band	2 B|2 22.84 cM	End	34,263,154 bp
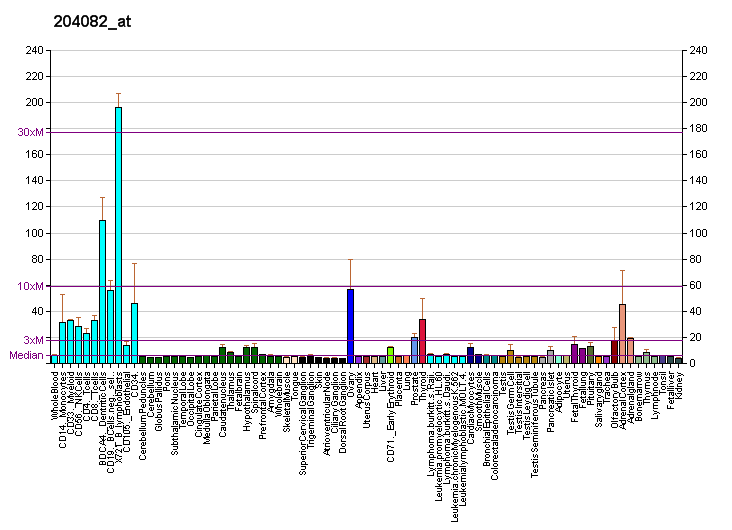
RNA expression pattern
Bgee	Human / Mouse (ortholog); Top expressed in: left ovary; right adrenal cortex; right ovary; left adrenal cortex; muscle layer of sigmoid colon; right auricle of heart; internal globus pallidus; C1 segment; gallbladder; vena cava / Top expressed in: Rostral migratory stream; epithelium of lens; substantia nigra; olfactory bulb; dorsal striatum; ciliary body; retinal pigment epithelium; dorsal tegmental nucleus; adrenal gland; external carotid artery; More reference expression data
BioGPS	More reference expression data
Gene ontology
Molecular function	DNA-binding transcription factor activity; RNA polymerase II cis-regulatory region sequence-specific DNA binding; DNA binding; sequence-specific DNA binding; DNA-binding transcription activator activity, RNA polymerase II-specific; DNA-binding transcription factor activity, RNA polymerase II-specific; protein binding
Cellular component	nucleus; transcription regulator complex
Biological process	regulation of respiratory gaseous exchange by nervous system process; adult locomotory behavior; anterior compartment pattern formation; dorsal spinal cord development; neuron development; regulation of transcription, DNA-templated; transcription by RNA polymerase II; posterior compartment specification; respiratory gaseous exchange by respiratory system; positive regulation of transcription by RNA polymerase II; transcription, DNA-templated
Sources:Amigo / QuickGO
Orthologs
Databases	NCBI: entry; OMA: entry
Species	Human	Mouse
Entrez	5090	18516
Ensembl	ENSG00000167081	ENSMUSG00000038718
UniProt	P40426; Q96AL5	O35317
RefSeq (mRNA)	NM_001134778; NM_006195; NM_001330782	NM_001290576; NM_016768
RefSeq (protein)	NP_001128250; NP_001317711; NP_006186; NP_006186.1	NP_001277505; NP_058048
Location (UCSC)	Chr 9: 125.75 – 125.97 Mb	Chr 2: 34.06 – 34.26 Mb
PubMed search
- Wikidata
View/Edit Human	View/Edit Mouse

Pre-B-cell leukemia transcription factor 3 is a protein that in humans is encoded by the PBX3 gene.
