= Aquaporin-7 =

Protein-coding gene in the species Homo sapiens

AQP7

Identifiers
- Aliases: AQP7, AQP7L, AQP9, AQPap, GLYCQTL, aquaporin 7
- External IDs: OMIM: 602974; MGI: 1314647; GeneCards: AQP7

Gene location (Human)
Chr.	Chromosome 9 (human)
Band	9p13.3	Start	33,383,179 bp
Band	9p13.3	End	33,402,682 bp

Gene location (Mouse)
Chr.	Chromosome 4 (mouse)
Band	4|4 A5	Start	41,033,074 bp
Band	4|4 A5	End	41,048,139 bp
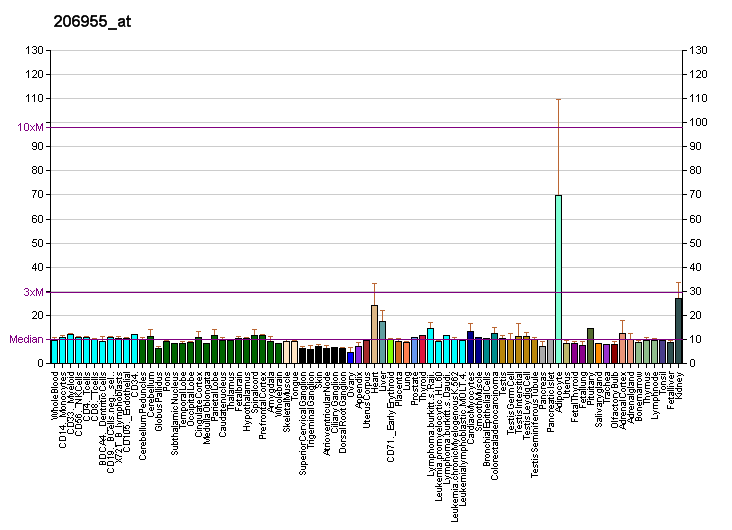
RNA expression pattern
Bgee	Human / Mouse (ortholog); Top expressed in: apex of heart; subcutaneous adipose tissue; left ventricle; sural nerve; right auricle of heart; muscle of thigh; lactiferous gland; gastric mucosa; duodenum; quadriceps femoris muscle / Top expressed in: spermatid; seminiferous tubule; brown adipose tissue; aortic valve; white adipose tissue; proximal tubule; right kidney; tunica adventitia of aorta; ascending aorta; muscle of thigh; More reference expression data
BioGPS	More reference expression data
Gene ontology
Molecular function	glycerol channel activity; water channel activity; channel activity; urea transmembrane transporter activity
Cellular component	cytoplasm; integral component of membrane; plasma membrane; integral component of plasma membrane; membrane; cell-cell junction; lipid droplet; cell cortex; cytoplasmic vesicle membrane; cytoplasmic vesicle
Biological process	water transport; excretion; glycerol transport; generation of precursor metabolites and energy; transmembrane transport; urea transmembrane transport
Sources:Amigo / QuickGO
Orthologs
Databases	NCBI: entry; OMA: entry
Species	Human	Mouse
Entrez	364	11832
Ensembl	ENSG00000165269	ENSMUSG00000028427
UniProt	O14520	O54794
RefSeq (mRNA)	NM_001170; NM_001318156; NM_001318157; NM_001318158; NM_001376191 NM_001376192; NM_001376193	NM_007473
RefSeq (protein)	NP_001161; NP_001305085; NP_001305086; NP_001305087; NP_001363120 NP_001363121; NP_001363122	NP_031499; NP_001365567; NP_001365568; NP_001365569; NP_001365570 NP_001365571
Location (UCSC)	Chr 9: 33.38 – 33.4 Mb	Chr 4: 41.03 – 41.05 Mb
PubMed search
- Wikidata
View/Edit Human	View/Edit Mouse

Aquaporin-7 (AQP-7) is a protein that in humans is encoded by the AQP7 gene.

Aquaporins/major intrinsic proteins (MIP) are a family of water-selective membrane channels. Aquaporin-7 has greater sequence similarity with AQP3 and AQP9 and they may be a subfamily. Aquaporin-7 and AQP3 are at the same chromosomal location suggesting that 9p13 may be a site of an aquaporin cluster. Aquaporin-7 facilitates water, glycerol and urea transport. It may play an important role in thermoregulation in the form of perspiration, and sperm function.
