= SH3GLB1 =

Protein-coding gene in humans

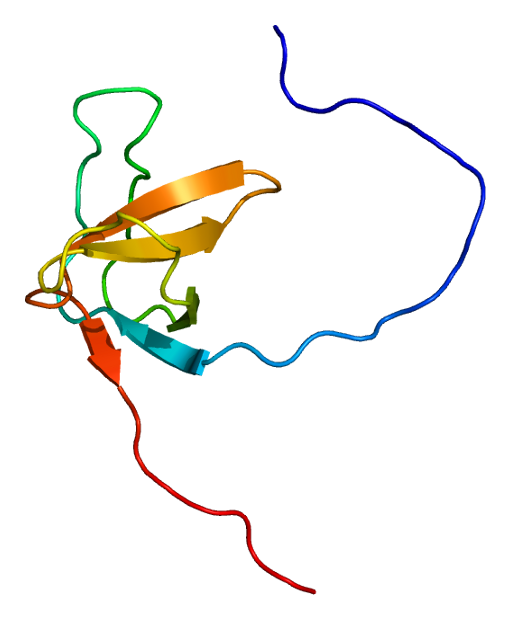

Identifiers
- Aliases: SH3GLB1, Bif-1, PPP1R70, dJ612B15.2, CGI-61, SH3 domain containing GRB2 like endophilin B1, SH3 domain containing GRB2 like, endophilin B1
- External IDs: OMIM: 609287; MGI: 1859730; GeneCards: SH3GLB1
Available structures
PDB	Ortholog search: PDBe RCSB
PDB	List of PDB id codes 1X43

Gene location (Human)
Chr.	Chromosome 1 (human)
Band	1p22.3	Start	86,704,570 bp
Band	1p22.3	End	86,748,184 bp

Gene location (Mouse)
Chr.	Chromosome 3 (mouse)
Band	3|3 H2	Start	144,389,439 bp
Band	3|3 H2	End	144,426,096 bp
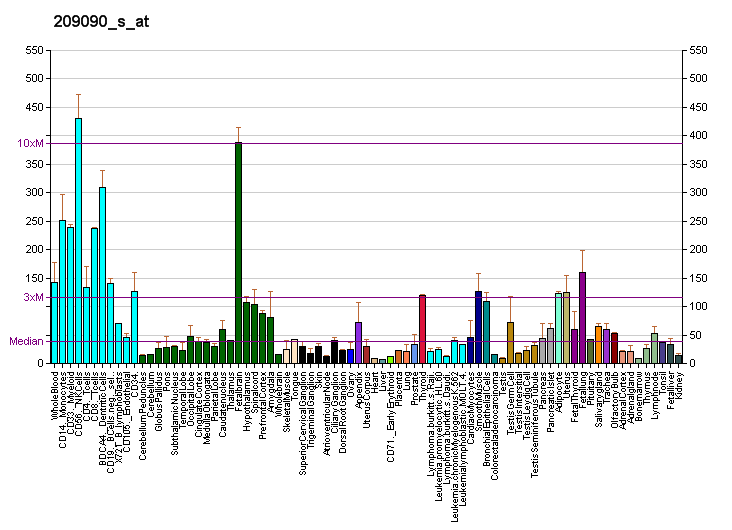

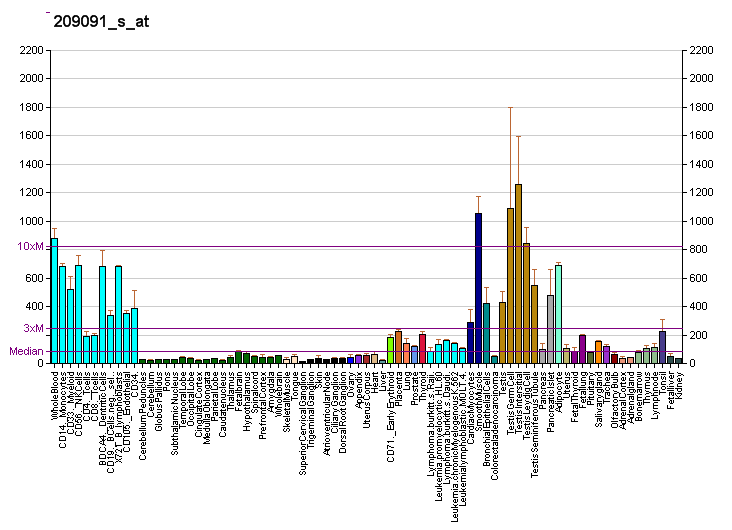

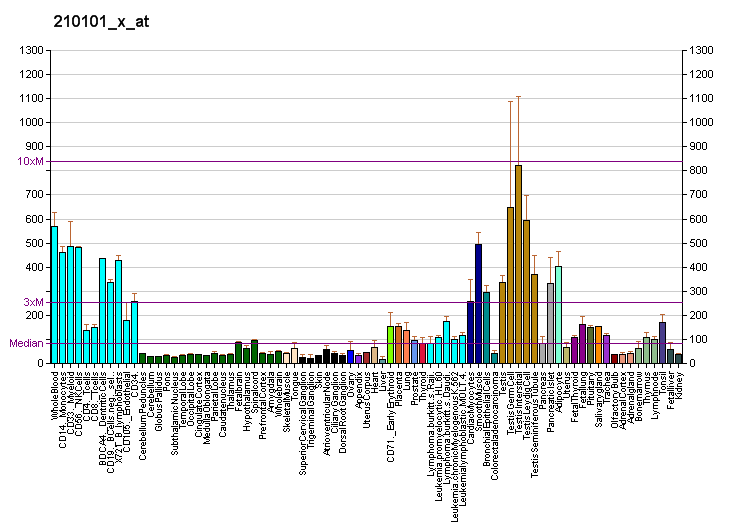
RNA expression pattern
Bgee	Human / Mouse (ortholog); Top expressed in: tibialis anterior muscle; deltoid muscle; right ventricle; muscle of trunk; Skeletal muscle tissue of rectus abdominis; gastrocnemius muscle; thoracic diaphragm; oocyte; muscle of arm; biceps brachii / Top expressed in: blood; seminiferous tubule; ankle; endothelial cell of lymphatic vessel; temporal muscle; digastric muscle; sternocleidomastoid muscle; triceps brachii muscle; medial head of gastrocnemius muscle; right ventricle; More reference expression data
BioGPS	More reference expression data
Gene ontology
Molecular function	protein homodimerization activity; protein binding; identical protein binding; lipid binding; cadherin binding
Cellular component	cytoplasm; Golgi apparatus; membrane; Golgi membrane; mitochondrial outer membrane; autophagosome membrane; midbody; mitochondrion; extracellular exosome; cytoplasmic vesicle; cytosol
Biological process	cellular response to glucose starvation; regulation of cytokinesis; regulation of protein stability; positive regulation of autophagosome assembly; positive regulation of autophagy; positive regulation of protein targeting to mitochondrion; cellular response to amino acid starvation; receptor catabolic process; autophagy; protein complex oligomerization; membrane fission; positive regulation of protein oligomerization; positive regulation of membrane tubulation; autophagic cell death; regulation of macroautophagy; protein localization to vacuolar membrane; apoptotic process
Sources:Amigo / QuickGO
Orthologs
Databases	NCBI: entry; OMA: entry
Species	Human	Mouse
Entrez	51100	54673
Ensembl	ENSG00000097033	ENSMUSG00000037062
UniProt	Q9Y371	Q9JK48
RefSeq (mRNA)	NM_001206651; NM_001206652; NM_001206653; NM_016009	NM_001282037; NM_001282042; NM_019464; NM_001379170; NM_001379171 NM_001379172; NM_001379173; NM_001379174
RefSeq (protein)	NP_001193580; NP_001193581; NP_001193582; NP_057093	NP_001268966; NP_001268971; NP_062337; NP_001366099; NP_001366100 NP_001366101; NP_001366102; NP_001366103
Location (UCSC)	Chr 1: 86.7 – 86.75 Mb	Chr 3: 144.39 – 144.43 Mb
PubMed search
- Wikidata
View/Edit Human	View/Edit Mouse

Endophilin-B1 is a protein that in humans is encoded by the SH3GLB1 gene. Endophilin-B1 belongs to the Bin/Amphiphysin/Rvs167 (BAR) family of proteins and plays a critical role in mitochondrial fission and fusion, as well as in autophagy and apoptosis. Loss of functional endophilin-B1 is seen in many different forms of cancer. The link between carcinogenesis and dysregulation of cell death pathways suggests that endophilin-B1 serves a critical tumor suppressor role in the cell, although the underlying mechanisms are not known.

== Structure ==
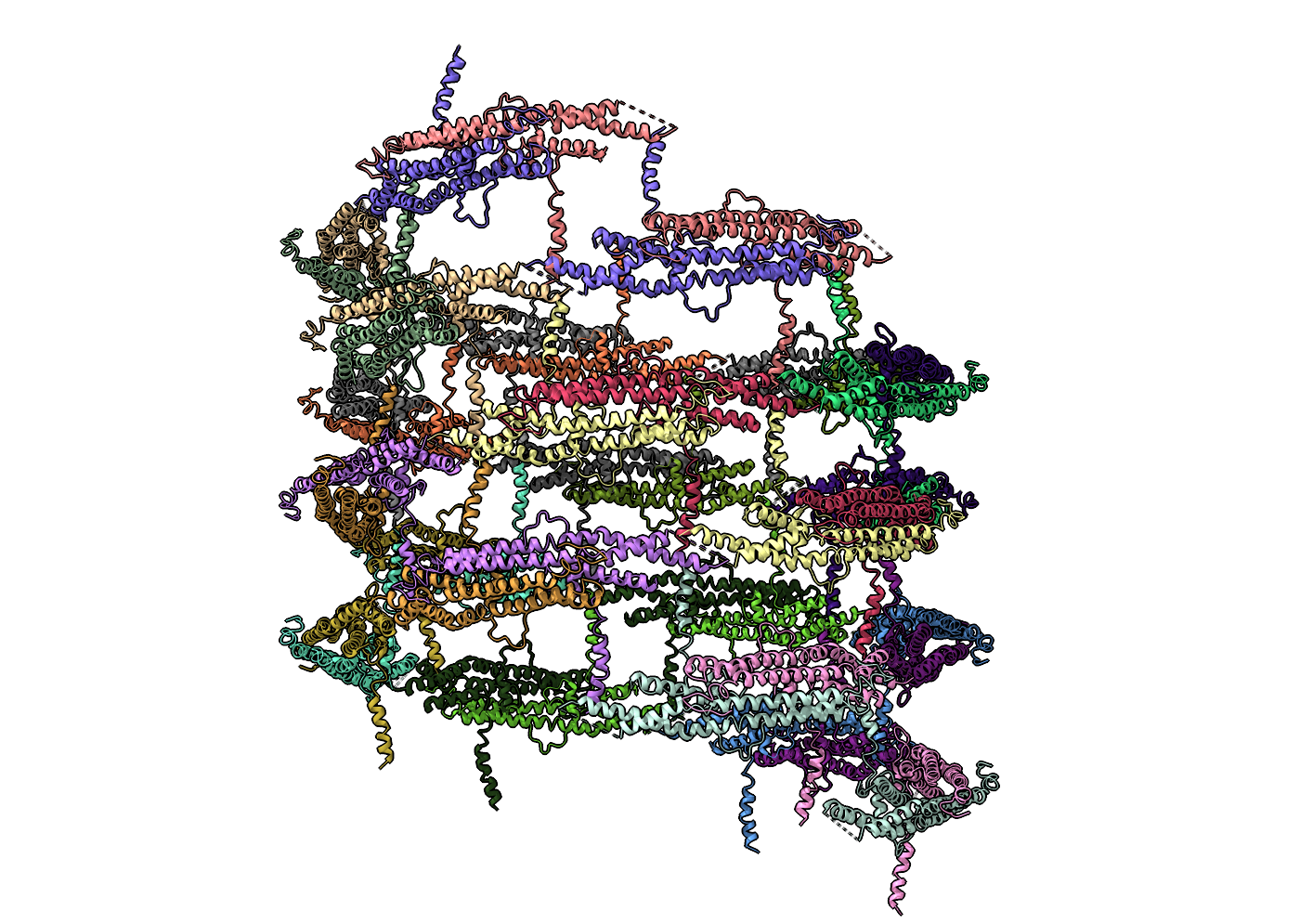
A pseudo-atomic model of helical scaffolds formed by a truncated form of endophilin-B1. Based on a ChimeraX rendering of 6UP6.

In the presence of model biological membranes, endophilin-B1 dimers assemble into helical scaffolds around the membrane and drive its tubulation.

== Interactions ==
In addition to the membrane binding and remodeling properties endophilin-B1 shares with many other BAR proteins, endophilin-B1 interacts with the pro-apoptotic factor Bcl-2-associated X protein (Bax) and SH3GLB2. It has also been shown to interact with a wide variety of proteins through a canonical SH3 domain that enables PxxP motif-containing protein interactions, including Beclin-1, amphiphysin-1, amphiphysin-2, and huntingtin.
