= Aquaporin-3 =

Protein-coding gene in the species Homo sapiens

AQP3

Identifiers
- Aliases: AQP3, AQP-3, GIL, aquaporin 3 (Gill blood group)
- External IDs: OMIM: 600170; MGI: 1333777; GeneCards: AQP3

Gene location (Human)
Chr.	Chromosome 9 (human)
Band	9p13.3	Start	33,441,156 bp
Band	9p13.3	End	33,447,596 bp

Gene location (Mouse)
Chr.	Chromosome 4 (mouse)
Band	4|4 A5	Start	41,092,722 bp
Band	4|4 A5	End	41,098,183 bp
RNA expression pattern
Bgee	Human / Mouse (ortholog); Top expressed in: nasal epithelium; gingival epithelium; mucosa of pharynx; epithelium of nasopharynx; parotid gland; human penis; palpebral conjunctiva; vulva; oral cavity; nipple / Top expressed in: lip; olfactory epithelium; transitional epithelium of urinary bladder; yolk sac; esophagus; right kidney; mucous cell of stomach; skin of external ear; conjunctival fornix; cornea; More reference expression data
BioGPS	n/a
Gene ontology
Molecular function	water channel activity; glycerol channel activity; transporter activity; channel activity; urea transmembrane transporter activity
Cellular component	cytoplasm; integral component of membrane; membrane; cell-cell junction; plasma membrane; basolateral plasma membrane; nucleus
Biological process	positive regulation of immune system process; excretion; response to vitamin D; response to retinoic acid; water transport; urea transport; odontogenesis; response to calcium ion; renal water homeostasis; regulation of keratinocyte differentiation; renal water absorption; glycerol transport; cellular response to oxygen-glucose deprivation; cellular response to hypoxia; transmembrane transport; urea transmembrane transport
Sources:Amigo / QuickGO
Orthologs
Databases	NCBI: entry; OMA: entry
Species	Human	Mouse
Entrez	360	11828
Ensembl	ENSG00000165272	ENSMUSG00000028435
UniProt	Q92482	Q8R2N1
RefSeq (mRNA)	NM_004925; NM_001318144	NM_016689
RefSeq (protein)	NP_001305073; NP_004916	NP_057898
Location (UCSC)	Chr 9: 33.44 – 33.45 Mb	Chr 4: 41.09 – 41.1 Mb
PubMed search
- Wikidata
View/Edit Human	View/Edit Mouse

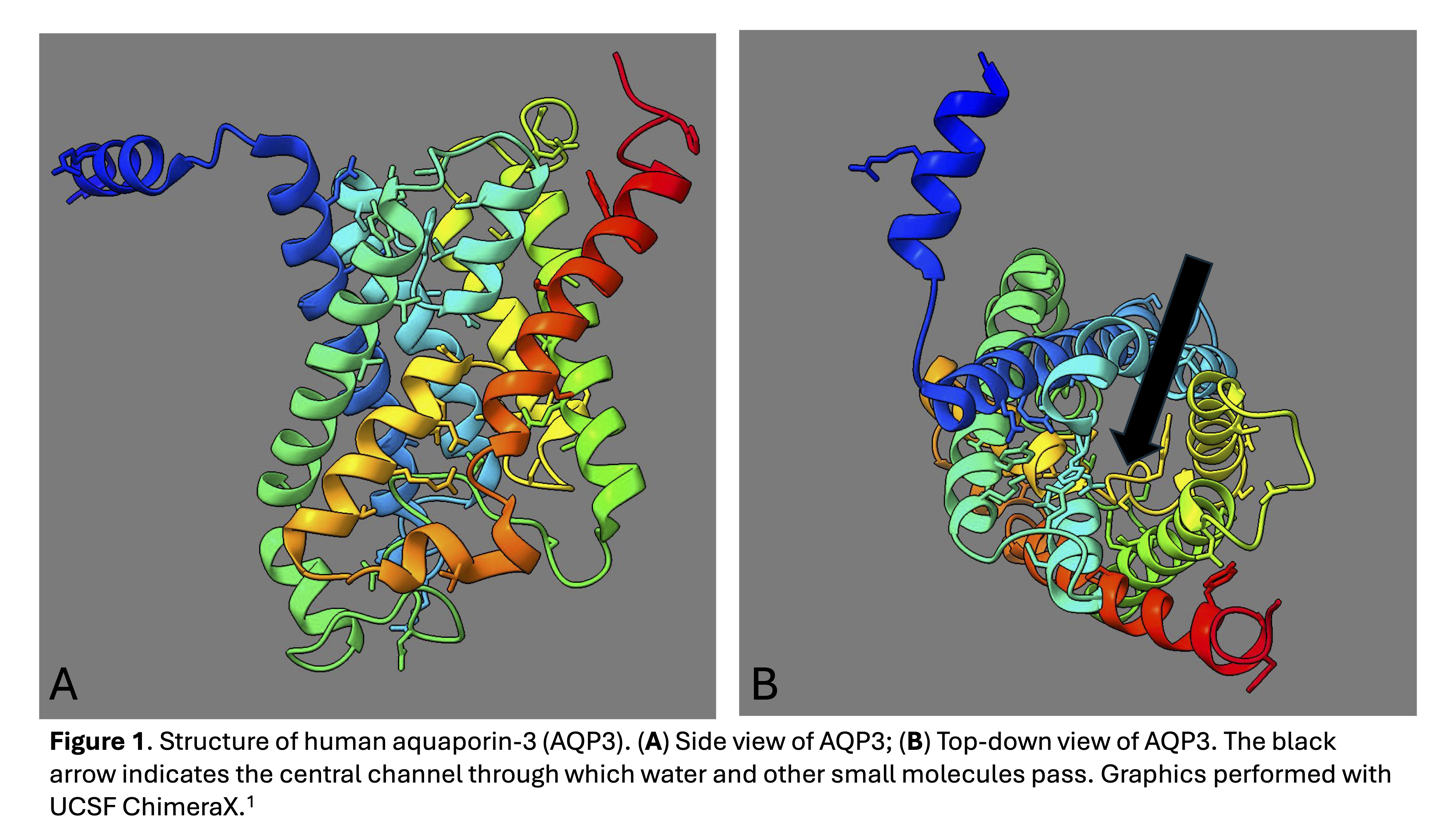

Aquaporin 3 (AQP-3) is the protein product of the human AQP3 gene. It is found in the basolateral cell membrane of principal collecting duct cells and provides a pathway for water to exit these cells. Aquaporin-3 is also permeable to glycerol, ammonia, urea, and hydrogen peroxide. It is expressed in various tissues including the skin, respiratory tract, and kidneys as well as various types of cancers. In the kidney, aquaporin-3 is unresponsive to the antidiuretic hormone vasopressin, unlike aquaporin-2. This protein is also a determinant for the GIL blood group system.

Suberoylanilide hydroxamic acid (SAHA) (a HDAC inhibitor) increases expression of aquaporin-3 in normal skin cells (keratinocytes).

== Clinical significance ==
Aquaporin 3 levels are often lower in psoriasis than in healthy skin.

Aquaporin 3 is expressed more in atopic eczema.

Recent studies indicate that aquaporin 3 is overexpressed in many types of malignancies such as melanoma and primary effusion lymphomas as well as cancers of the lung, colon, stomach, esophagus, mouth, liver, and pancreatic duct. Based on these as well as cell culture studies, it is suggested that this overexpression contributes to the growth and spread of at least some of these cancers and therefore may be a therapeutic target for the treatment of these cancers.

== See also ==
- Aquaporin
