= Aquaporin-9 =

Protein-coding gene in the species Homo sapiens

AQP9

Identifiers
- Aliases: AQP9, AQP-9, HsT17287, SSC1, T17287, aquaporin 9
- External IDs: OMIM: 602914; MGI: 1891066; GeneCards: AQP9

Gene location (Human)
Chr.	Chromosome 15 (human)
Band	15q21.3	Start	58,138,169 bp
Band	15q21.3	End	58,185,911 bp

Gene location (Mouse)
Chr.	Chromosome 9 (mouse)
Band	9|9 D	Start	71,017,941 bp
Band	9|9 D	End	71,075,964 bp
RNA expression pattern
Bgee	Human / Mouse (ortholog); Top expressed in: blood; monocyte; right lobe of liver; periodontal fiber; granulocyte; caput epididymis; germinal epithelium; corpus epididymis; bone marrow; right lung / Top expressed in: left lobe of liver; spermatocyte; granulocyte; spermatid; zygote; secondary oocyte; seminiferous tubule; primary oocyte; blood; blastocyst; More reference expression data
BioGPS	n/a
Gene ontology
Molecular function	porin activity; carboxylic acid transmembrane transporter activity; polyol transmembrane transporter activity; water transmembrane transporter activity; purine nucleobase transmembrane transporter activity; pyrimidine nucleobase transmembrane transporter activity; amine transmembrane transporter activity; water channel activity; urea channel activity; glycerol channel activity; channel activity; urea transmembrane transporter activity
Cellular component	integral component of membrane; intracellular membrane-bounded organelle; membrane; plasma membrane; integral component of plasma membrane; basolateral plasma membrane
Biological process	canalicular bile acid transport; excretion; water transport; amine transport; response to organic substance; water homeostasis; response to osmotic stress; polyol transport; carboxylic acid transport; immune response; pyrimidine nucleobase transport; response to mercury ion; glycerol transport; cellular response to cAMP; purine nucleobase transport; carboxylic acid transmembrane transport; purine nucleobase transmembrane transport; pyrimidine-containing compound transmembrane transport; transmembrane transport; urea transmembrane transport
Sources:Amigo / QuickGO
Orthologs
Databases	NCBI: entry; OMA: entry
Species	Human	Mouse
Entrez	366	64008
Ensembl	ENSG00000103569	ENSMUSG00000032204
UniProt	O43315	Q9JJJ3
RefSeq (mRNA)	NM_020980; NM_001320635; NM_001320636	NM_001271843; NM_022026
RefSeq (protein)	NP_001307564; NP_001307565; NP_066190	NP_001258772; NP_071309
Location (UCSC)	Chr 15: 58.14 – 58.19 Mb	Chr 9: 71.02 – 71.08 Mb
PubMed search
- Wikidata
View/Edit Human	View/Edit Mouse

Aquaporin-9 (AQP-9) is a protein that in humans is encoded by the AQP9 gene.

The aquaporins/major intrinsic protein are a family of water-selective membrane channels. Aquaporin-9 has greater sequence similarity with AQP3 and AQP7 and they may be a subfamily. Aquaporin-9 allows passage of a wide variety of noncharged solutes. AQP-9 stimulates urea transport and osmotic water permeability; there are contradicting reports about its role in providing glycerol permeability. Aquaporin-9 may also have some role in specialized leukocyte functions such as immunological response and bactericidal activity.
