= Aquaporin-5 =

Protein-coding gene in the species Homo sapiens

AQP5

Identifiers
- Aliases: AQP5, AQP-5, PPKB, aquaporin 5
- External IDs: OMIM: 600442; MGI: 106215; GeneCards: AQP5
Available structures
| PDB | Ortholog search: PDBe RCSB |
| PDB | List of PDB id codes 3D9S, 5C5X, 5DYE |

Gene location (Human)
| Chr. | Chromosome 12 (human) |
| Band | 12q13.12 | Start | 49,961,872 bp |
| Band | 12q13.12 | End | 49,965,682 bp |

Gene location (Mouse)
| Chr. | Chromosome 15 (mouse) |
| Band | 15 F1|15 56.13 cM | Start | 99,488,663 bp |
| Band | 15 F1|15 56.13 cM | End | 99,492,710 bp |
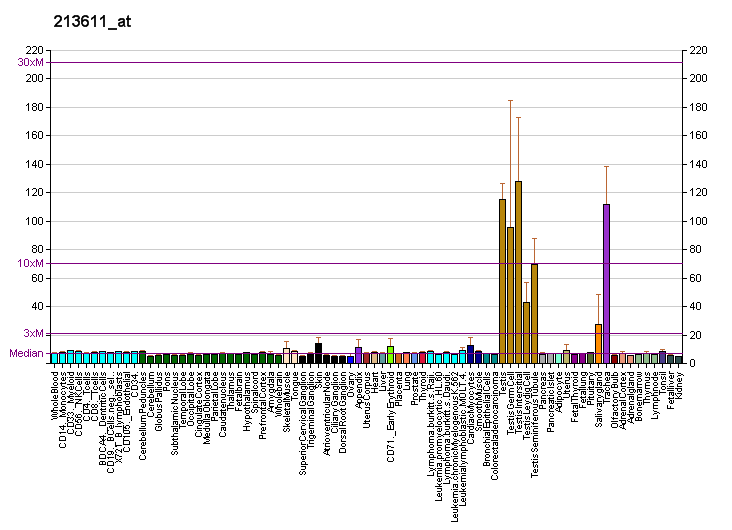
RNA expression pattern
| Bgee | Human / Mouse (ortholog); Top expressed in: olfactory zone of nasal mucosa; palpebral conjunctiva; left testis; right testis; parotid gland; skin of leg; nasal epithelium; minor salivary glands; trachea; skin of abdomen / Top expressed in: submandibular gland; parotid gland; lacrimal gland; right lung; right lung lobe; respiratory epithelium; olfactory epithelium; trachea; epithelium of lens; left lung; More reference expression data |
| BioGPS | More reference expression data |
Gene ontology
| Molecular function | transporter activity; protein binding; water channel activity; identical protein binding; channel activity |
| Cellular component | integral component of membrane; membrane; plasma membrane; integral component of plasma membrane; microvillus; basal plasma membrane; apical plasma membrane; endoplasmic reticulum; extracellular exosome; cytoplasmic vesicle membrane; cytoplasmic vesicle |
| Biological process | excretion; water transport; pancreatic juice secretion; saliva secretion; odontogenesis; ion transmembrane transport; camera-type eye morphogenesis; carbon dioxide transport; transport; transmembrane transport; protein homotetramerization; cellular hypotonic response |
Sources:Amigo / QuickGO
Orthologs
| Databases | NCBI: entry; OMA: entry |
| Species | Human | Mouse |
| Entrez | 362 | 11830 |
| Ensembl | ENSG00000161798 | ENSMUSG00000044217 |
| UniProt | P55064 | Q9WTY4 |
| RefSeq (mRNA) | NM_001651 | NM_009701 |
| RefSeq (protein) | NP_001642 | NP_033831 |
| Location (UCSC) | Chr 12: 49.96 – 49.97 Mb | Chr 15: 99.49 – 99.49 Mb |
| PubMed search |
- Wikidata
| View/Edit Human | View/Edit Mouse |

Aquaporin-5 (AQP-5) is a protein that in humans is encoded by the AQP5 gene.

Aquaporin-5 (AQP-5) is a water channel protein. Aquaporins are a family of small integral membrane proteins related to the major intrinsic protein (MIP or AQP0). Aquaporin-5 plays a role in the generation of saliva, tears and pulmonary secretions. AQP0, AQP2, AQP5, and AQP6 are closely related and all map to 12q13.

AQP-5 features a homotetrameric structure embedded in the cell membrane with the center of each monomer acting as a water pore. Each monomer structure is a transmembrane protein which have an asparagine–proline–alanine (NPA) hydrophobic residue embedded in the membrane of the cell. The NPA residue plays a role in water and solute permeability across the membrane of the cell.
