= Aquaporin-2 =

Protein-coding gene in the species Homo sapiens

AQP2

Identifiers
- Aliases: AQP2, AQP-CD, WCH-CD, aquaporin 2, NDI2
- External IDs: OMIM: 107777; MGI: 1096865; GeneCards: AQP2
Available structures
PDB	Ortholog search: PDBe RCSB
PDB	List of PDB id codes 4OJ2, 4NEF

Gene location (Human)
Chr.	Chromosome 12 (human)
Band	12q13.12	Start	49,950,737 bp
Band	12q13.12	End	49,958,878 bp

Gene location (Mouse)
Chr.	Chromosome 15 (mouse)
Band	15 F1|15 56.13 cM	Start	99,476,936 bp
Band	15 F1|15 56.13 cM	End	99,482,428 bp
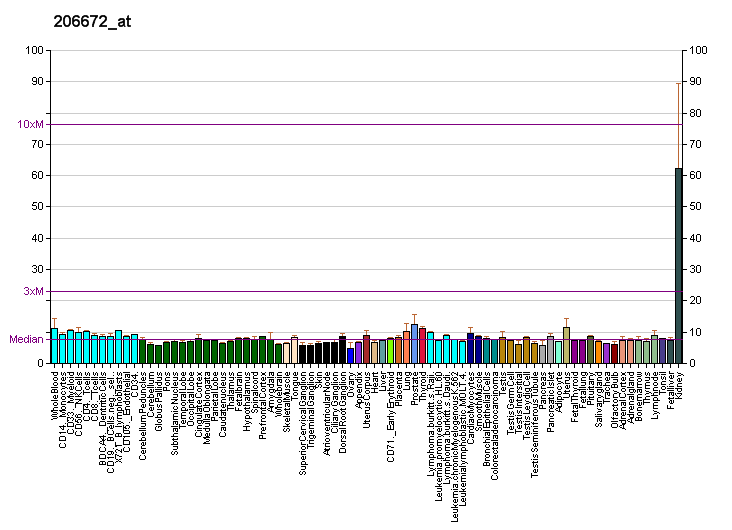
RNA expression pattern
Bgee	Human / Mouse (ortholog); Top expressed in: renal medulla; seminal vesicula; sperm; kidney tubule; human kidney; testicle; tail of epididymis; buccal mucosa cell; glomerulus; metanephric glomerulus / Top expressed in: right kidney; human kidney; gastrula; renal cortex; lobe of prostate; proximal tubule; metanephros; skin of external ear; medullary collecting duct; muscle of thigh; More reference expression data
BioGPS	More reference expression data
Gene ontology
Molecular function	transporter activity; glycerol transmembrane transporter activity; water transmembrane transporter activity; water channel activity; protein binding; channel activity
Cellular component	integral component of membrane; recycling endosome; Golgi apparatus; membrane; plasma membrane; transport vesicle membrane; basolateral plasma membrane; apical plasma membrane; extracellular exosome; cytoplasmic vesicle membrane; cytoplasmic vesicle; integral component of plasma membrane; lumenal side of membrane
Biological process	cellular response to mercury ion; excretion; water transport; ion transmembrane transport; renal water transport; renal water homeostasis; cellular response to copper ion; metanephric collecting duct development; cellular response to water deprivation; glycerol transport; transport; transmembrane transport; protein homotetramerization
Sources:Amigo / QuickGO
Orthologs
Databases	NCBI: entry; OMA: entry
Species	Human	Mouse
Entrez	359	11827
Ensembl	ENSG00000167580	ENSMUSG00000023013
UniProt	P41181	P56402
RefSeq (mRNA)	NM_000486	NM_009699
RefSeq (protein)	NP_000477	NP_033829
Location (UCSC)	Chr 12: 49.95 – 49.96 Mb	Chr 15: 99.48 – 99.48 Mb
PubMed search
- Wikidata
View/Edit Human	View/Edit Mouse

Aquaporin-2 (AQP-2) is found in the apical cell membranes of the kidney's collecting duct principal cells and in intracellular vesicles located throughout the cell. It is encoded by the AQP2 gene.

== Regulation ==
It is the only aquaporin regulated by vasopressin. The basic job of aquaporin 2 is to reabsorb water from the primary urine that flows into the nephron from the filtration of blood in the glomerulus through the Bowman's capsule. Aquaporin 2 is in kidney epithelial cells and usually lies dormant in intracellular vesicle membranes. When it is needed, vasopressin binds to the cell surface vasopressin receptor thereby activating a signaling pathway that causes the aquaporin 2 containing vesicles to fuse with the plasma membrane, so the aquaporin 2 can be used by the cell. This aquaporin is regulated in two ways by the peptide hormone vasopressin:

- short-term regulation (minutes) through trafficking of AQP2 vesicles to the apical region where they fuse with the apical plasma membrane;
- long-term regulation (days) through an increase in AQP2 gene expression, in a pathway involving cyclic AMP and protein kinases.

This aquaporin is also regulated by food intake. Fasting reduces expression of this aquaporin independently of vasopressin.

== Clinical significance ==
Mutations in this channel are associated with nephrogenic diabetes insipidus, which can be autosomal dominant or recessive. Mutations in the vasopressin receptor cause a similar X-linked phenotype.

Lithium, which is often used to treat bipolar disorder, can cause acquired diabetes insipidus (characterized by the excretion of large volumes of dilute urine) by decreasing the expression of the AQP2 gene.

The expression of the AQP2 gene is increased during conditions associated with water retention such as pregnancy and congestive heart failure.

== See also ==
- Aquaporin
