= Aquaporin =

Water channel protein in cell membranes

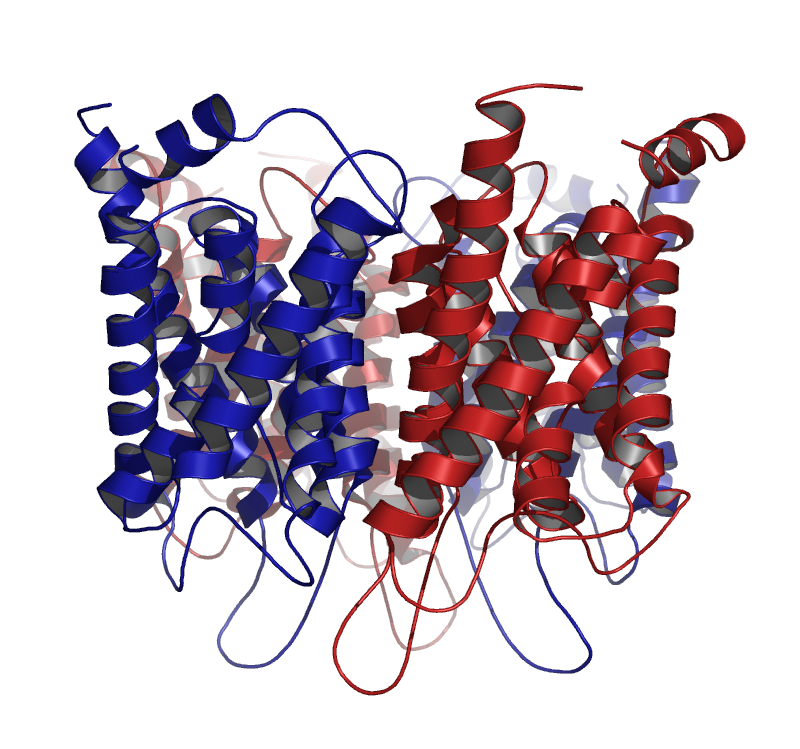
- Crystallographic structure of aquaporin 1 (AQP1) PDB 1j4n

Identifiers
- Symbol: Aquaporin
- Pfam: PF00230
- InterPro: IPR000425
- PROSITE: PDOC00193
- SCOP2: 1fx8 / SCOPe / SUPFAM
- TCDB: 1.A.8
- OPM superfamily: 7
- OPM protein: 2zz9
Available protein structures:
- PDB: IPR000425 PF00230 (ECOD; PDBsum)
- AlphaFold: IPR000425; PF00230

Aquaporins, also called water channels, are channel proteins from a larger family of major intrinsic proteins that form pores in the membrane of biological cells, mainly facilitating transport of water between cells. The cell membranes of a variety of different bacteria, fungi, animal and plant cells contain aquaporins. While water can pass through the phospholipid bilayer of the cell membrane through simple diffusion, this is relatively slow because water is a polar molecule; aquaporins provide facilitated transport, allowing water to flow more rapidly into and out of the cell, in effect increasing the water permeability of the cell membrane.

Aquaporins have six membrane-spanning α-helical domains with both carboxylic and amino terminals on the cytoplasmic side. Two hydrophobic loops contain conserved asparagine–proline–alanine ("NPA motif") which form a barrel surrounding a central pore-like region that contains additional protein density.

The 2003 Nobel Prize in Chemistry was awarded jointly to Peter Agre for the discovery of aquaporins and Roderick MacKinnon for his work on the structure and mechanism of potassium channels.

Genetic defects involving aquaporin genes have been associated with several human diseases including nephrogenic diabetes insipidus and neuromyelitis optica.

== History ==
The mechanism of facilitated water transport and the probable existence of water pores has attracted researchers since 1957. In most cells, water moves in and out by osmosis through the lipid component of cell membranes. Due to the relatively high water permeability of some epithelial cells, it was long suspected that some additional mechanism for water transport across membranes must exist. Solomon and his co-workers performed pioneering work on water permeability across the cell membrane in the late 1950s. In the mid-1960s, an alternative hypothesis (the "partition–diffusion model") sought to establish that the water molecules partitioned between the water phase and the lipid phase and then diffused through the membrane, crossing it until the next interphase where they left the lipid and returned to an aqueous phase. Studies by Parisi, Edelman, Carvounis et al. accented not only the importance of the presence of water channels but also the possibility to regulate their permeability properties. In 1990, Verkman's experiments demonstrated functional expression of water channels, indicating that water channels are effectively proteins.

== Discovery ==
It was not until 1992 that the first aquaporin, 'aquaporin-1' (originally known as CHIP 28), was reported by Peter Agre, of Johns Hopkins University. In 1999, together with other research teams, Agre reported the first high-resolution images of the three-dimensional structure of an aquaporin, namely, aquaporin-1. Further studies using supercomputer simulations identified the pathway of water as it moved through the channel and demonstrated how a pore can allow water to pass without the passage of small solutes. The pioneering research and subsequent discovery of water channels by Agre and his colleagues won the Nobel Prize in Chemistry in 2003. Agre said he discovered aquaporins "by serendipity." He had been studying the Rh blood group antigens and had isolated the Rh molecule, but a second molecule, 28 kilodaltons in size (and therefore called 28K) kept appearing. At first they thought it was a Rh molecule fragment, or a contaminant, but it turned out to be a new kind of molecule with unknown function. It was present in structures such as kidney tubules and red blood cells, and related to proteins of diverse origins, such as in fruit fly brain, bacteria, the lens of the eye, and plant tissue.

Agre and two colleagues at Johns Hopkins University started investigating. Xenopus laevis oocytes have membranes that are relatively waterproof and survive hypotonicity. mRNA of 28K was injected into the oocytes, which incoming water then inflated and lysed. This showed 28K was a water channel.

However the first report of protein-mediated water transport through membranes was by Gheorghe Benga and others in 1986, prior to Agre's first publication on the topic. This led to a controversy that Benga's work had not been adequately recognized either by Agre or by the Nobel Prize Committee.

== Function ==
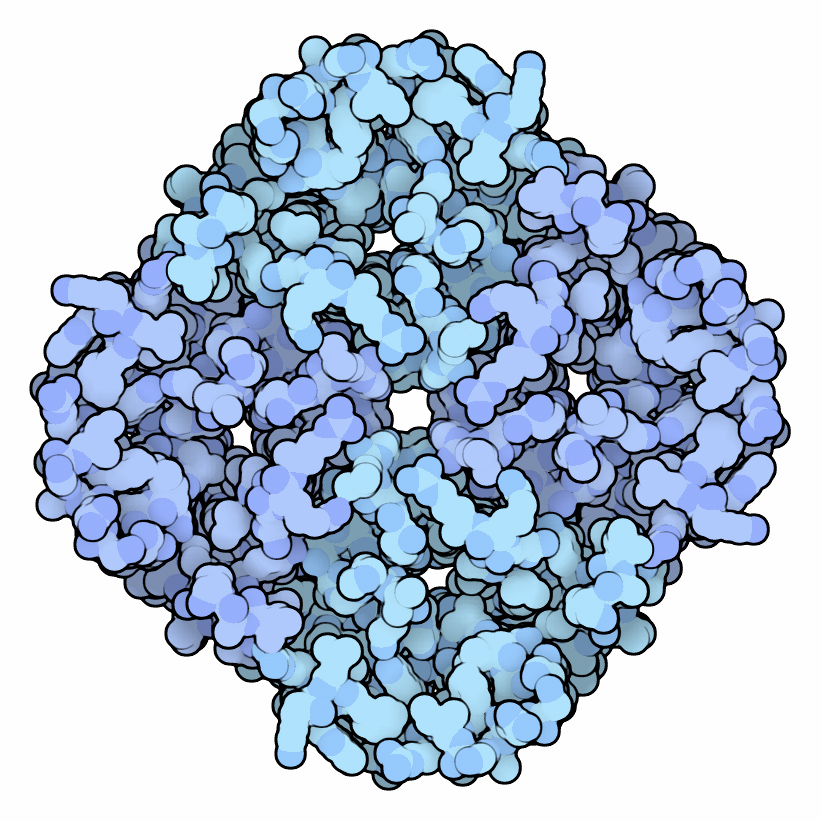
Illustration of aquaporin molecule

Aquaporins are "the plumbing system for cells". Water moves through cells in an organized way, most rapidly in tissues that have aquaporin water channels. For many years, scientists assumed that water leaked through the cell membrane, and some water does. However, this did not explain how water could move so quickly through some cells.

Aquaporins selectively conduct water molecules in and out of the cell, while preventing the passage of ions and other solutes. Also known as water channels, aquaporins are integral membrane pore proteins. Some of them, known as aquaglyceroporins, also transport other small uncharged dissolved molecules including ammonia, CO_{2}, glycerol, and urea. For example, the aquaporin 3 channel has a pore width of 8–10 Ångströms and allows the passage of hydrophilic molecules ranging between 150 and 200 Da. However, the water pores completely block ions including protons, essential to conserve the membrane's electrochemical potential difference.

Water molecules traverse through the pore of the channel in single file. The presence of water channels increases membrane permeability to water. These are also essential for the water transport system in plants and tolerance to drought and salt stresses. Each monomer conducts ~10^{9} water molecules per second.

== Structure ==
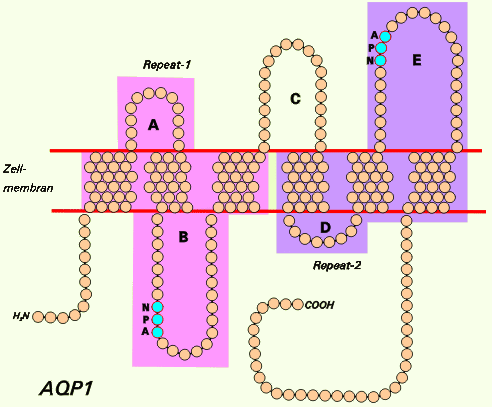
Schematic diagram of the 2D structure of aquaporin 1 (AQP1) depicting the six transmembrane α-helices and the five interhelical loop regions A–E

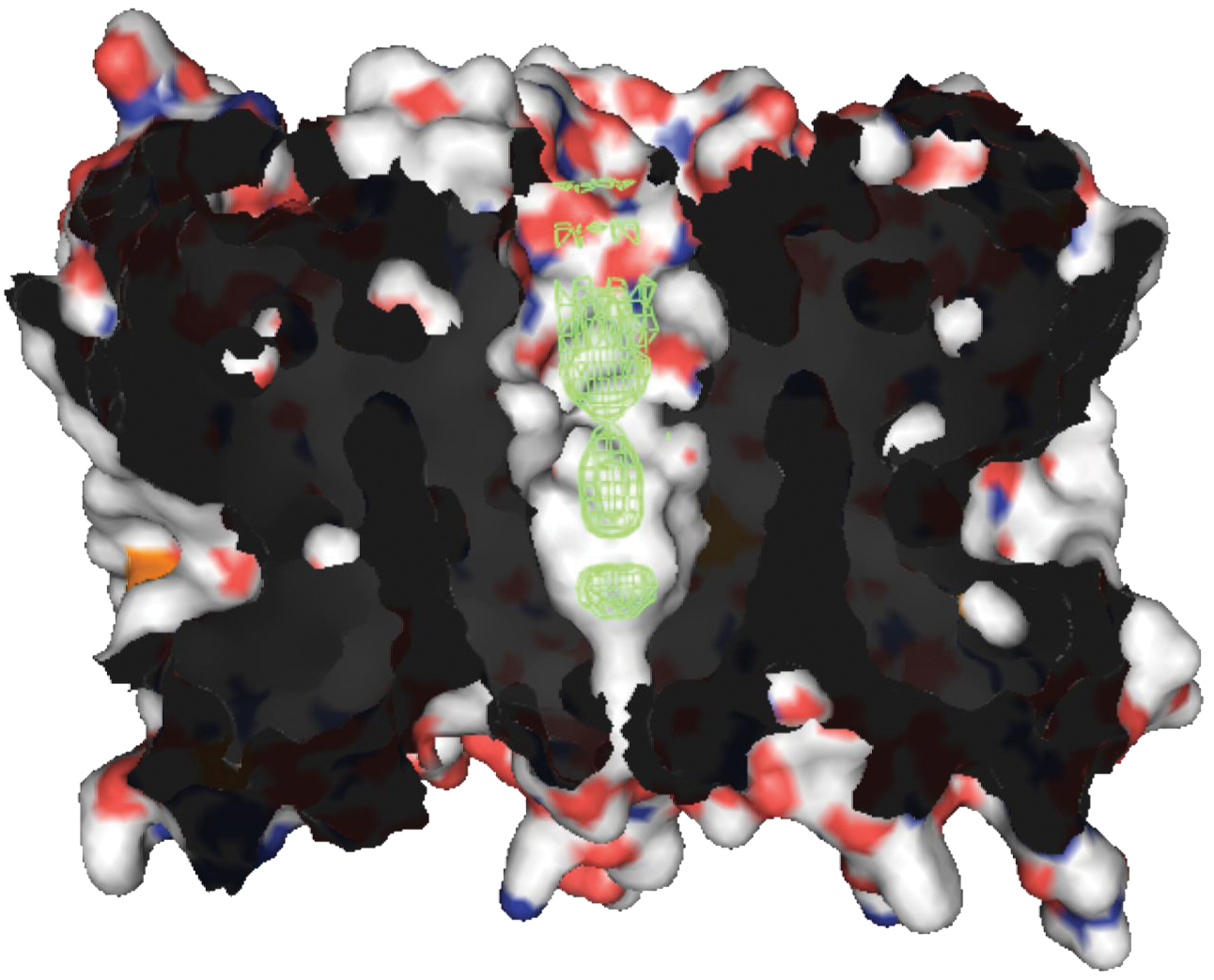
The 3D structure of aquaporin Z highlighting the 'hourglass'-shaped water channel that cuts through the center of the protein

Aquaporin proteins are composed of a bundle of six transmembrane α-helices. They are embedded in the cell membrane. The amino and carboxyl ends face the inside of the cell. The amino and carboxyl halves resemble each other, apparently repeating a pattern of nucleotides. This may have been created by the doubling of a formerly half-sized gene. Between the helices are five regions (A–E) that loop into or out of the cell membrane, two of them hydrophobic (B, E), with an asparagine–proline–alanine ("NPA motif") pattern. They create a distinctive hourglass shape, making the water channel narrow in the middle and wider at each end.

Another and even narrower place in the AQP1 channel is the "ar/R selectivity filter", a cluster of amino acids enabling the aquaporin to selectively let through or block the passage of different molecules.

Aquaporins form four-part clusters (tetramers) in the cell membrane, with each of the four monomers acting as a water channel. Different aquaporins have different sized water channels, the smallest types allowing nothing but water through.

X-ray profiles show that aquaporins have two conical entrances. This hourglass shape could be the result of a natural selection process toward optimal permeability. It has been shown that conical entrances with suitable opening angle can indeed provide a large increase of the hydrodynamic channel permeability.

=== NPA motif ===
Aquaporin channels appear in simulations to allow only water to pass, as the molecules effectively queue up in single file. Guided by the aquaporin's local electric field, the oxygen in each water molecule faces forwards as it enters, turning around half way along and leaving with the oxygen facing backwards. The arrangement of opposite-facing electrostatic potentials in the two halves of the channel prevents the flow of protons but permits water to pass freely.

=== ar/R selectivity filter ===
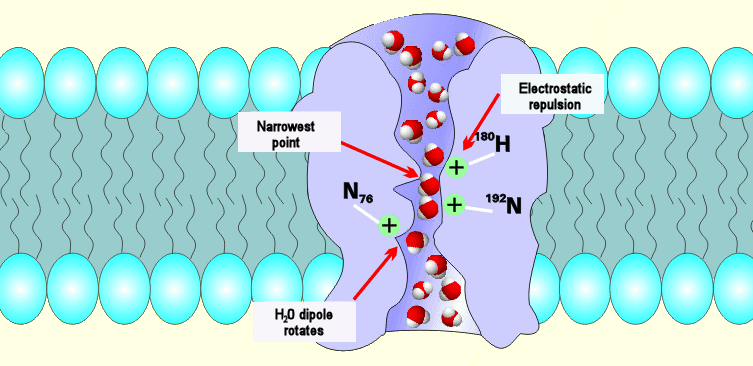
Schematic depiction of water movement through the narrow selectivity filter of the aquaporin channel

The aromatic/arginine or "ar/R" selectivity filter is a cluster of amino acids that help bind to water molecules and exclude other molecules that may try to enter the pore. It is the mechanism by which the aquaporin is able to selectively bind water molecules and so to allow them through, and to prevent other molecules from entering. The ar/R filter is made of two amino acid groups from helices B (HB) and E (HE) and two groups from loop E (LE1, LE2), from the two sides of the NPA motif. Its usual position is 8 Å on the outer side of the NPA motif; it is typically the tightest part of the channel. Its narrowness weakens the hydrogen bonds between water molecules, enabling the arginines, which carry a positive charge, to interact with the water molecules and to filter out undesirable protons.

== Taxonomic distribution ==
=== In mammals ===
There are thirteen known types of aquaporins in mammals; six of these are located in the kidney, but the existence of many more is suspected. The most studied aquaporins are compared in the following table:

Type	Location	Function
Aquaporin 1	kidney (apically); proximal convoluted tubule; proximal straight tubule; thin descending loop of Henle	Water reabsorption
Aquaporin 2	kidney (apically); connecting tubule; cortical collecting duct; outer medullary collecting duct; inner medullary collecting duct	Water reabsorption in response to ADH
Aquaporin 3	kidney (basolaterally); connecting tubule; cortical collecting duct; outer medullary collecting duct	Water reabsorption and glycerol permeability
Aquaporin 4	kidney (basolaterally); inner medullary collecting duct	Water reabsorption

=== In plants ===
In plants, water is taken up from the soil through the roots, where it passes from the cortex into the vascular tissues. There are three routes for water to flow in these tissues, known as the apoplastic, symplastic and transcellular pathways. Specifically, aquaporins are found in the vacuolar membrane, in addition to the plasma membrane of plants; the transcellular pathway involves transport of water across the plasma and vacuolar membranes. When plant roots are exposed to mercuric chloride, which is known to inhibit aquaporins, the flow of water is greatly reduced while the flow of ions is not, supporting the view that there exists a mechanism for water transport independent of the transport of ions: aquaporins. Aquaporins can play a major role in extension growth by allowing an influx of water into expanding cells – a process necessary to sustain plant development. Plant aquaporins are important for mineral nutrition and ion detoxification; these are both essential for the homeostasis of minerals such as boron.

Aquaporins in plants are separated into four main homologous subfamilies, or groups:

- Plasma membrane Intrinsic Protein (PIP)
- Tonoplast Intrinsic Protein (TIP)
- Nodulin-26 like Intrinsic Protein (NIP)
- Small basic Intrinsic Protein (SIP)

These five subfamilies have later been divided into smaller evolutionary subgroups based on their DNA sequence. PIPs cluster into two subgroups, PIP1 and PIP2, whilst TIPs cluster into 5 subgroups, TIP1, TIP2, TIP3, TIP4 and TIP5. Each subgroup is again split up into isoforms e.g. PIP1;1, PIP1;2. As isoforms nomenclature are historically based on functional parameters rather than evolutive ones, several novel propositions on plant aquaporines have been arisen with the study of the evolutionary relationships between the different aquaporins. Within the various selection of aquaporin isoforms in plants, there are also unique patterns of cell- and tissue-specific expression.

When plant aquaporins are silenced, the hydraulic conductance and photosynthesis of the leaf decrease. When gating of plant aquaporins occurs, it stops the flow of water through the pore of the protein. This may happen for various reasons, for example when the plant contains low amounts of cellular water due to drought. The gating of an aquaporin is carried out by an interaction between a gating mechanism and the aquaporin, which causes a 3D change in the protein so that it blocks the pore and, thus, disallows the flow of water through the pore. In plants, there are at least two forms of aquaporin gating: gating by the dephosphorylation of certain serine residues, in response to drought, and the protonation of specific histidine residues, in response to flooding. The phosphorylation of an aquaporin is involved in the opening and closing of petals in response to temperature.

=== In Heteroconts ===
Specific aquaporins called Large Intrinsic Proteins (LIP) have been found in Heterokonts, including diatoms and brown algae. LIPs contain an NPM-motif in place of the second conserved NPA-motif typical of the majority of MIPs.

=== In other organisms ===
Aquaporins have been discovered in the fungi Saccharomyces cerevisiae (yeast), Dictyostelium, Candida and Ustilago and the protozoans Trypanosoma and Plasmodium.

== Clinical significance ==
Multiple diseases are identified as resulting from mutations in aquaporins:

- Mutations in the aquaporin-2 gene cause hereditary nephrogenic diabetes insipidus in humans.
- Mice homozygous for inactivating mutations in the aquaporin-0 gene develop congenital cataracts.
- A small number of people have been identified with severe or total deficiency in aquaporin-1. They are, in general, healthy, but exhibit a defect in the ability to concentrate solutes in the urine and to conserve water when deprived of drinking water.
- Mice with targeted deletions in aquaporin-1 also exhibit a deficiency in water conservation due to an inability to concentrate solutes in the kidney medulla by countercurrent multiplication.

Aquaporins also play a key role in acquired forms of nephrogenic diabetes insipidus, disorders that cause increased urine production. In rats, acquired nephrogenic diabetes insipidus can be caused by impaired regulation of aquaporin-2 due to administration of lithium salts, low potassium concentrations in the blood (hypokalemia) and high calcium concentrations in the blood (hypercalcemia). Autoimmune reactions against aquaporin 4 in humans produce Devic's disease.

== See also ==
- Aquaporin-5
- Aquaporin-6
- Aquaporin-7
- Aquaporin-8
- Aquaporin-9
