= Willy A. Flegel =

German-American medical researcher

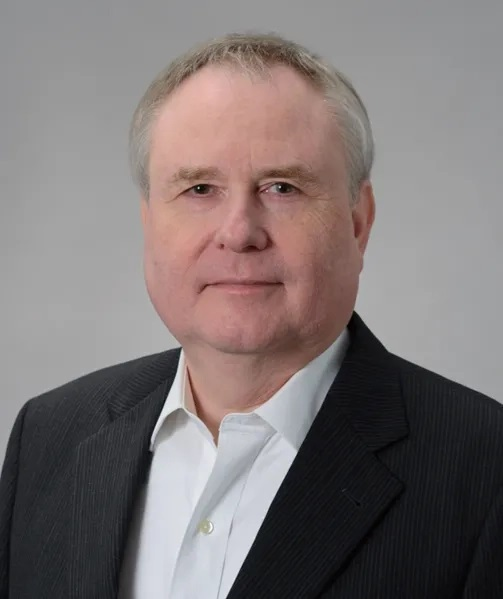
- Flegel in 2024

Personal details
- Born: Willy Albrecht Flegel; 3 June 1960 (age 65) Dieburg, Hessen, Germany
- Education: Goethe University Frankfurt (Dr. med.)
- Known for: Rh blood group, Red cell genotyping
- Awards: Philip-Levine-Preis (2004)
- Scientific career
- Fields: Gene expression, Immunohematology, Transfusion medicine
- Institutions: National Institutes of Health; NIH Clinical Center

Willy Albert Flegel is a German-American medical researcher, geneticist, and physician who is best known for his work in the field of the Rh blood group. Flegel is the chief of the laboratory services section of the Department of Transfusion Medicine at the National Institutes of Health Clinical Center (NIH).

== Early life and education ==
Flegel was born and educated in Dieburg, West-Germany, and attended Johann Wolfgang Goethe Universität in Frankfurt am Main, Germany to study medicine, where he also obtained an M.D. by research. He trained as specialist for transfusion medicine at the Universität Ulm, Germany and in molecular biology research at the University of California, San Diego. He completed his habilitation (Privatdozent) at the Universität Ulm.

== Career ==
Flegel has medical licenses issued by the state of Hessen, Germany and the state of Maryland, and holds certification by the Board of Physicians Baden-Württemberg, specialty transfusion medicine. Previous clinical appointment: chief, Department of Immunohematology at the German Red Cross Blood Service Baden-Württemberg - Hessen in Ulm for 16 years. Flegel came to the NIH Clinical Center in 2009 and remains at the NIH as the chief of the Laboratory Services Section in the Department of Transfusion Medicine.

For more than a decade, he worked alongside Harvey J. Alter, chief of Infectious Disease Section, until Dr. Alter´s retirement from NIH. Flegel published more than 300 works, including books, book chapters, articles in scientific journals and magazines, and patents. He organized and chaired 10 National Institutes of Health symposia on red cell genotyping from 2012 (Clinical Solutions) to 2021 (The New Normal). Since the 1990s Flegel has early on been an advocate for the need and use of red cell genotyping to advance patient care and safety in the hospital and research.

== Academic ==
=== Appointments ===
- Professor (apl. Prof.) at the Universität Ulm
- Professor (adjunct track) at the Georgetown University Medical Center, Washington D.C.
- Guest professor at the Huazhong University of Science and Technology, Wuhan, Hubei, China

=== Editorial boards ===
- Associate Editor, Blood Transfusion (since 2022)
- Associate Editor, Transfusion (2012 - 2024)
- Senior Editor, Journal Translational Medicine (since 2010)
- Editorial Board member, Transfusion (2005 - 2011, since 2025)
- Editorial Board member, Blood Transfusion (2007 - 2021)
- International Editorial Board member, Chinese Medical Journal (since 2014)

== Medical research ==
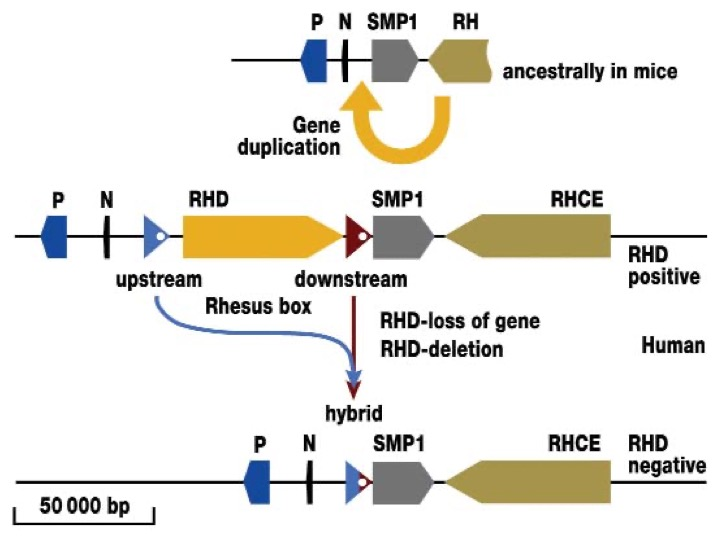
The 2 events leading to the duplication of the ancestral RH gene and the deletion of the RHD gene in humans. The original condition is represented by the RH gene locus of the mouse. A duplication event in early humans created a second RH gene that is oriented in reverse on the short arm of the human chromosome 1. The DNA segments flanking the inserted RHD gene are called upstream and downstream Rhesus boxes. A deletion event in recent humans caused the loss of the RHD gene. This RHD negative chromosome with a hybrid Rhesus box occurs in many humans today worldwide.

Flegel has received recognition for his research leading to the discovery of the molecular structure of the RH gene locus and most of the clinically relevant molecular variants in the RHD and RHCE genes. He proved that the weak expression of the D antigen is caused by Rh protein variants, which enabled a precision medicine approach to Rh prophylaxis in pregnancy. This work in collaboration with Franz F. Wagner refuted a scientific opinion that had been taught for decades. He showed the RHCE gene is the ancestral gene at the RH gene locus and a gene duplication event produced the RHD gene, which encodes the D antigen in humans (Rh positive phenotype). He explained that the prevalent Rh negative phenotype in humans occurred in a subsequent gene deletion event, eliminating the RHD gene.

== Other activities ==
=== Non-profit organizations ===
- Museum of Modern Art, Frankfurt, Freunde des MUSEUM^{MMK} für Moderne Kunst e.V. (since 2006), member
- Friends of the Goethe-Institut Washington D.C. (FoGI), U.S. 501(c)(3) charitable organization (since 2010), president of the board

== Honors and awards ==
- 2004 Philip-Levine-Preis, Deutsche Gesellschaft für Transfusionsmedizin und Immunhämatologie
- 2005 Membre d'honneur, Association Suisse de Médecine Transfusionnelle
- 2014 Visiting Professor,Tongji Medical College, Wuhan, Hubei, China
- 2015, 2012, 2010 NIH Clinical Center Director’s Awards
- 2024 Honorary Professor, Drum Tower Hospital, Nanjing University Medical School, Nanjing, Jiangsu, China
- 2025, 2024, 2022, 2021, 2017 NIH Clinical Center CEO Awards
- 2025 Kay Beattie Award and Lectureship
- 2026 Dale A. Smith Award

== Personal life ==
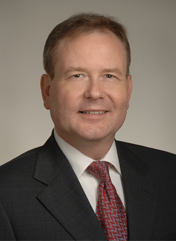
2010

Flegel lives in the metropolitan areas of Washington D.C. and Frankfurt am Main, Germany.

== Bibliography ==
=== Books and book chapters ===
- W. A. Flegel (chair), The Molecular Testing Standards Committee (AABB): Standards for Molecular Testing for Red Cell, Platelet, and Neutrophil Antigens. 7th Edition 2024. AABB Press, Bethesda MD, 116 pages. ISBN 978-1-56395-516-7
- H.-D. Lippert, W. A. Flegel. Kommentar zum Transfusionsgesetz (TFG) und den Hämotherapie-Richtlinien. 2002. Springer, Berlin, 521 pages. ISBN 3-540-41816-4 (Medical-legal textbook interpreting the code of federal regulations for transfusion medicine in Germany).

=== Editorial ===
- W. A. Flegel: COVID-19: risk of infection is high, independently of ABO blood group. Haematologica 2020; 105(12): 2706-2708.
- W. A. Flegel: COVID-19 insights from transfusion medicine. British J Haematol 2020; 190(5): 715-717.
- W. A. Flegel: Mosaicism by somatic non-functional mutations: one cell lineage at a time. Haematologica. 2019; 104(3):425-427.
- W. A. Flegel: Red cell alloimmunisation: incidence and prevention. Lancet Haematol. 2016; 3(6):e260-1.
- W. A. Flegel: Rare gems: null phenotypes of blood groups. Blood Transfus. 2010; 8(1):2-4.
- W. A. Flegel: Will MICA glitter for recipients of kidney transplants? New Engl J Med 2007; 357(13):1337-9.
- W. A. Flegel: Blood group genotyping in Germany. Transfusion. 2007; 47(1 Suppl):47S-53S.
- H. Northoff, W. A. Flegel: Genotyping and phenotyping: the two sides of one coin. Infusionsther Transfusionsmed. 1999; 26:5.

=== Original research ===
- W. A. Flegel, Gottschall, J. L., Denomme, G. A.: Integrating red cell genotyping into the blood supply chain: a population-based study. Lancet Haematol 2: e282 – e288, 2015.
- W. A. Flegel, F. F. Wagner: Molecular genetics of RH. Vox Sang. 2000; 78(Suppl 2):109-15.
- W..A. Flegel, A. W. Singson, J. S. Margolis, A. G. Bang, J. W. Posakony, C. Murre: Dpbx, a new homeobox gene closely related to the human proto-oncogene pbx1 molecular structure and developmental expression. Mech Dev 1993; 41(2-3):155-161.
- W. A. Flegel, A. Wölpl, D. N. Männel, H. Northoff: Inhibition of endotoxin-induced activation of human monocytes by human lipoproteins. Infect Immun 1989; 57(7):2237-2245.

=== Reviews ===
- W. A. Flegel: Modern Rhesus (Rh) typing in transfusion and pregnancy. CMAJ 2021; 193(4):E124.
- W. A. Flegel: Pathogenesis and mechanisms of antibody-mediated hemolysis. Transfusion. 2015; 55(Suppl 2):S47-58.
- W. A. Flegel: Molecular genetics and clinical applications for RH. Transfus Apher Sci. 2011; 44(1):81-91.
- W. A. Flegel: The Genetics of the Rhesus Blood Group System. Dtsch Ärztebl. 2007; 104(10): A-651.
- W. A. Flegel: How I manage donors and patients with a weak D phenotype. Curr Opin Hematol. 2006; 13(6):476-83.
- W. A. Flegel, F. F. Wagner, T. H. Müller, C. Gassner: Rh phenotype prediction by DNA typing and its application to practice. Transfus Med. 1998; 8(4):281-302.
