= RHD =

RHD may refer to:

- RHD (gene), a gene which determines RhD positive or negative
- RhD haemolytic disease of the newborn
- Rh(D), an antigen within the rhesus blood group system
- FAP 403 RHD, a coach bus model manufactured by Fabrika automobila Priboj
- Rabbit haemorrhagic disease, a disease caused by the rabbit haemorrhagic disease virus
- Red Hand Defenders, an illegal paramilitary organisation in Northern Ireland
- Rheumatic heart disease, a possible result of rheumatic fever
- Ribblehead railway station, North Yorkshire, England (National Rail station code)
- Right hemisphere brain damage
- Right-hand drive, where a car's steering wheel is mounted on the right side, see Left- and right-hand traffic
- Robbery Homicide Division, a division of the Los Angeles Police Department's Detective Bureau
- Robbery Homicide Division (TV series), a fictional American TV series set in that LAPD division
- Random House Dictionary of the English language
- Roads and Highways Department, a government organization of Bangladesh
