= RHD (gene) =

Protein-coding gene in humans

Identifiers
- Aliases: RHD, CD240D, DIIIc, RH, RH30, RHCED, RHDVA(TT), RHDel, RHPII, RHXIII, Rh4, RhDCw, RhII, RhK562-II, RhPI, Rh blood group D antigen, HDFNRH
- External IDs: OMIM: 111680; MGI: 1202882; GeneCards: RHD

Gene location (Human)
Chr.	Chromosome 1 (human)
Band	1p36.11	Start	25,272,393 bp
Band	1p36.11	End	25,330,445 bp

Gene location (Mouse)
Chr.	Chromosome 4 (mouse)
Band	4 D3|4 67.13 cM	Start	134,591,847 bp
Band	4 D3|4 67.13 cM	End	134,623,483 bp
RNA expression pattern
Bgee	Human / Mouse (ortholog); Top expressed in: buccal mucosa cell; trabecular bone; testicle; monocyte; granulocyte; bone marrow; blood; minor salivary glands; right uterine tube; bone marrow cell / Top expressed in: fetal liver hematopoietic progenitor cell; tibiofemoral joint; primary oocyte; human fetus; spleen; secondary oocyte; zygote; bone marrow; blood; femur; More reference expression data
BioGPS	n/a
Gene ontology
Molecular function	ammonium transmembrane transporter activity
Cellular component	integral component of membrane; integral component of plasma membrane; membrane; plasma membrane
Biological process	organic cation transport; ammonium transmembrane transport
Sources:Amigo / QuickGO
Orthologs
Databases	NCBI: entry; OMA: entry
Species	Human	Mouse
Entrez	6007	19746
Ensembl	ENSG00000187010	ENSMUSG00000028825
UniProt	Q02161	Q8CF94
RefSeq (mRNA)	NM_001127691; NM_001282867; NM_001282868; NM_001282869; NM_001282870 NM_001282871; NM_001282872; NM_016124; NM_016225	NM_011270
RefSeq (protein)	NP_001121163; NP_001269796; NP_001269797; NP_001269798; NP_001269799 NP_001269800; NP_001269801; NP_057208	NP_035400
Location (UCSC)	Chr 1: 25.27 – 25.33 Mb	Chr 4: 134.59 – 134.62 Mb
PubMed search
- Wikidata
View/Edit Human	View/Edit Mouse

Rh blood group, D antigen also known as Rh polypeptide 1 (RhPI) or cluster of differentiation 240D (CD240D) is a protein that in humans is encoded by the RHD gene.

The RHD gene codes for the RhD erythrocyte membrane protein that is the Rh factor antigen of the Rh blood group system. RHD has sequence similarity to RHCE, RhAG, RhBG, and RhCG and these five genes constitute the Rh family. It was proposed that the erythrocyte Rh complex is a heterotrimer of RhAG, RhD, and RhCE protein subunits. RhAG is a functional ammonia transporter and is required for normal cell surface expression of RhD and RhCE. Patients who lack RhD/RhCE/RhAG on the surface of their erythrocytes have hemolytic anemia. Antibodies to the RhD protein can cause Rh disease.

== See also ==
- ABO (gene)
