= RHCE =

RHCE may refer to:

- Red Hat Certified Engineer
- RHCE (gene), Rh blood group, CcEe antigens, a human gene
