= Rh deficiency syndrome =

- Rh deficiency syndrome is inherited in an Autosomal recessive manner.
- Specialty: Hematology

Rh deficiency syndrome is a type of hemolytic anemia that involves erythrocytes whose membranes are deficient in Rh antigens. It is considered a rare condition.

== Signs and symptoms ==
Clinically, people with Rh deficiency show mild to moderate chronic hemolytic anemia with variable degrees of spherostomatocytosis.

== Causes ==
The condition is caused by silent alleles at the RH locus (amorph type) or suppressor genes unrelated to the locus (regulator type) that individuals inherit in an autosomal recessive manner.

== History ==
Vos originally described Rh-deficiency syndrome in 1961, when a sample of blood failed to respond with several Rh antisera. However, R. Ceppellini used the term "Rhnull" for the first time. So far, at least 43 people from 14 families have been reported in the literature as having the Rhnull phenotype.

== See also ==
- List of hematologic conditions
- RHAG
