= Ammonia transporter =

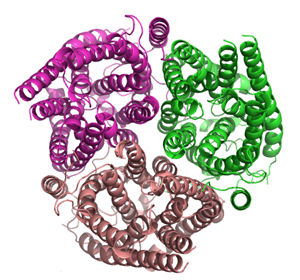
- Human Rhesus C Glycoprotein. PDB 3hd6

Identifiers
- Symbol: AmtB
- Pfam: PF00909
- InterPro: IPR001905
- TCDB: 1.A.11
- OPM superfamily: 13
- OPM protein: 2ns1
Available protein structures:
- PDB: IPR001905 PF00909 (ECOD; PDBsum)
- AlphaFold: IPR001905; PF00909

Ammonia transporters (TC# 1.A.11) are structurally related membrane transport proteins called Amt proteins (ammonia transporters) in bacteria and plants, methylammonium/ammonium permeases (MEPs) in yeast, or Rhesus (Rh) proteins in chordates. In humans, the RhAG, RhBG, and RhCG Rhesus proteins constitute solute carrier family 42 whilst RhD and RhCE form the Rh blood group system. The three-dimensional structure of the ammonia transport protein AmtB from Escherichia coli has been determined by x-ray crystallography revealing a hydrophobic ammonia channel. The human RhCG ammonia transporter was found to have a similar ammonia-conducting channel structure. It was proposed that the erythrocyte Rh complex is a heterotrimer of RhAG, RhD, and RhCE subunits in which RhD and RhCE might play roles in anchoring the ammonia-conducting RhAG subunit to the cytoskeleton. Based on reconstitution experiments, purified RhCG subunits alone can function to transport ammonia. RhCG is required for normal acid excretion by the mouse kidney and epididymis.

== Structure ==
The structure of the ammonia channel from E. coli, was, at the time of its publication, the highest resolution structure of any integral membrane protein. It shows a trimer of subunits, each made up of 11 transmembrane segments (TMSs) and containing a pseudo two-fold symmetry. Each monomer contains a hydrophobic ammonia conducting channel.

While prokaryotic ammonia channel proteins have an N-terminal region which acts as a signal sequence and is cleaved in the mature protein, the Rhesus glycoproteins retain this as a 12th transmembrane helix in the mature protein.

== Substrate specificity ==
Most functionally characterized members of the family are ammonium uptake transporters. Some, but not other Amt proteins also transport methylammonium. Detailed phylogenetic analyses of plant homologues have been published. In E. coli, NH_{4}^{+}, rather than NH_{3}, may be the substrate of AmtB, but controversy still exists. If NH_{4}^{+} is transported, K^{+} possibly serves as a counter ion in an antiport process with K^{+}, and that one histidine removes a proton off of NH_{4}^{+} to yield NH_{3}.

=== Transport reaction ===
The generalized transport reaction catalyzed by members of the Amt family are suggested to be:

NH_{4}^{+} (out) ⇌ NH_{4}^{+} (in)

== Mechanism ==
The X-ray structures have revealed that the pore of the Amt and Rh proteins is characterized by a hydrophobic portion about 12 Å long, in which electronic density was observed in the crystallographic study of AmtB from Escherichia coli. This electronic density was initially only observed when crystals were grown in the presence of ammonium, and was thus attributed to ammonia molecules. The Amt/Rh protein mechanism might involve the single-file diffusion of NH_{3} molecules. However, the pore could also be filled with water molecules. The possible presence of water molecules in the pore lumen calls for a reassessment of the notion that Amt/Rh proteins work as plain NH_{3} channels. Indeed, functional experiments on plant ammonium transporters and Rh proteins suggest a variety of permeation mechanisms including the passive diffusion of NH_{3}, the antiport of NH_{4}^{+}/H^{+}, the transport of NH_{4}^{+}, or the cotransport of NH_{3}/H^{+}. Lamoureux et al. discuss these mechanisms in light of functional and simulation studies on the AmtB transporter.

== Regulation ==
In E. coli the AmtB gene is expressed only under limiting nitrogen levels to yield the AmtB protein. It is co-expressed with the GlnK gene which encodes a PII protein. This protein is also trimeric and remains in the cytoplasm. It is covalently modified by a U/U deuridylylated group at Y51. The hydrolyzed product, adenosine 5'-diphosphate, orients the surface of GlnK for AmtB blockade. When nitrogen levels outside the cell rise, the ammonia channel must be deactivated to prevent excessive ammonia entering the cell (where ammonia would be combined with glutamate to make glutamine, utilizing ATP and thereby depleting the cell's ATP reserves). This deactivation is achieved by deuridylylation of the GlnK protein which then binds to the cytoplasmic face of AmtB and inserts a loop into the ammonia conducting pore. At the tip of this loop is an arginine residue which sterically blocks the channel.

== Human ammonia transporter-related proteins ==
RHAG, RHBG, RHCE, RHCG, RHD
