= Flegel =

Flegel may refer to:

== People ==
- Erna Flegel, (1911-2006), German nurse
- Eduard Robert Flegel, (1855-1886), German explorer
- Georg Flegel (1566–1638), German painter
- Murray Flegel (born 1948), ice hockey player
- Willy A. Flegel (born 1960), professor of transfusion medicine and Immunohematology

== Film ==
- So ein Flegel
