= Oneg =

Oneg can refer to:

- A ritual associated with Shabbat, in which friends and relatives eat, sing, or simply spend time together
- Oneg the Prober, a fictional character from Marvel Comics
- An abbreviation for O-negative blood carrying blood type O in the ABO blood group system and blood type Rh negative in the Rh blood group system.
