= David Holy =

German audio drama producer

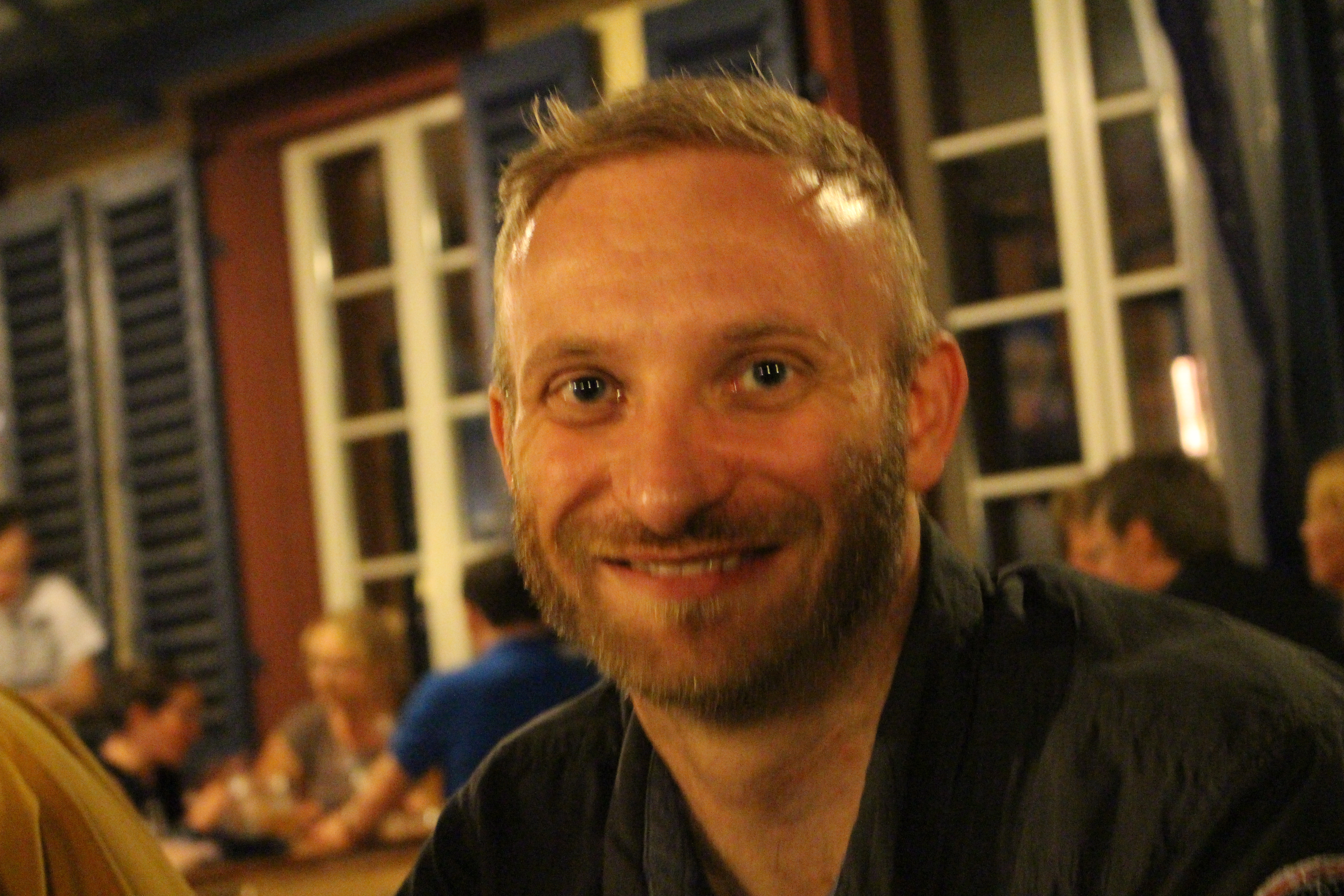
- David Holy (2015)
- Born: 1979 (age 46–47); Aschaffenburg, Bavaria, Germany
- Occupations: Producer, writer, publisher, radio drama director, designer, entrepreneur
- Years active: 2005–present

David Holy (born 1979) is a German designer, publisher, radio drama director, writer, producer and entrepreneur.

== Biography ==
David Holy was born in Aschaffenburg, Bavaria (Germany). After leaving school, he attended the Goethe University Frankfurt to study business administration and Japanology. He dropped out of university early to pursue his interest in computer graphics and design. Subsequently, Holy successfully trained as an audio-visual media designer at a local television network, focusing mainly on 3D design and camera work.

He then founded his own company "Holysoft Studios Ltd" and decided to study media production in Dieburg. The ad agency contributed greatly to the success of various local clients and small/medium-sized companies, including the delivery of television content over Internet Protocol networks (IPTV). His hard work and dedication didn't go unnoticed: According to the magazine Videoaktiv Digital, major television networks would face serious competition due to David Holy's ambitious endeavor (2008).

In 2009, Holy established the publishing company „HK Media GmbH & Co KG“, releasing several radio drama serials between 2010 and now. Die Letzten Helden (The Last Heroes) was among the first and one of the most successful to this day. Due to the large number of contributing voice actors/actresses and long running times (up to six hours per episode and longer), the magazine Hörbücher raised the question: Is Die Letzten Helden the biggest radio drama show ever created?

Holy also devotes himself to real estate. In 2015, he established his personal Youtube channel, releasing some of his works for promotion purposes.

== Work ==
=== Radio drama/audio book series ===
- 2008 Chronik der Verdammten (Chronicles of the Damned), 1 episode (6 in the works)
- 2010 Die letzten Helden (The Last Heroes), 24 episodes and 3 specials
- 2010 Heff der Chef (Heff the Boss), 24 episodes und 3 specials
- 2010 Videospielhelden (Video Game Heroes), 6 episodes
- 2011 Drachenlanze (Dragonlance), 12 episodes
- 2012 Das Schwarze Auge (The Dark Eye), 6 audio books
- 2016 Holy Klassiker (Holy Classics), Classics of World Literature, 90 episodes
- 2016 Cyberdetective, 11 episodes plus soundtrack
- 2016 Die Fußballbande (Soccer Friends), 7 episodes
- 2018 Holy Horror, 60 episodes
- 2020 Hello Kitty, 24 Episoden
- 2021 Karl May, 31 Episoden
- 2021 Cthulhucalypse, 6 Episoden
- 2022 Die Abenteuer der Letzten Helden
- 2022 Sherlock Holmes Legends
- 2022 Van Dusen
- 2023 Die Bibel - Altes Testament
- 2023 Die Bibel - Neues Testament
- 2023 Lupin Legends
- 2023 Solomon Kane
- 2024 Lovecraft Legends
- 2024 Holy Crazy Crime
- 2024 Infinity
- 2025 Der kleine Prinz
- 2025 Das Traumzauberbuch
- 2025 Holy Krimi
- 2025 Groschengrusel
- 2026 Van Dusen Classics
- 2026 Van Dusen Mysteries
- 2026 Van Dusen Legends
- 2026 Sherlock Holmes International
- 2026 Sherlock Holmes Mysteries

=== Other radio dramas ===
- 2006 Der Zukunftszug (The Train of the Future)
- 2016 Merle und die fließende Königin (Merle and the Flowing Queen), 3 radio dramas
- 2017 Arkadien Trilogie (Arcadia Trilogy), 3 radio dramas
- 2019 Sturmkönige Trilogie, 3 radio dramas

=== Books/novels ===
- Das todgeweihte Kind (The Doomed Child), 2013, ISBN 978-394189976-6
- Der Bund des schwarzen Gottes (The Dark God), 2013, ISBN 978-394189974-2
- Herr der Albträume (Lord of Nightmares), 2013, ISBN 978-394189975-9
- Silbersterns Meisterplan (Silverstar's Masterplan), 2013, ISBN 978-3941899742

=== Comic ===
- The Doomed Child / Das todgeweihte Kind, 2021

=== Videogames ===
- The Doomed Knight, planned for 2027
- Fallen Tears: The Ascension, 2026
- Out and About

== Awards and nominations ==
- 2008 Simply CG Award (Product Design), 2nd place
- Various Radio Drama of the Month awards for Die Letzten Helden (The Last Heroes)
- Nomination: Best Radio Drama Series - Die Letzten Helden (The Last Heroes), Ohrkanus 2011
