= RHSA =

RHSA may refer to:

- Royal Humane Society of Australasia, an Australian charity
- Rosedale Heights School of the Arts, a high school in Toronto, Canada
- Red Hat Certification Program, Red Hat Certified System Administrator (RHCSA) is often incorrectly abbreviated as RHSA

== See also ==
- Reich Security Main Office (German: Reichssicherheitshauptamt or RSHA), an organization subordinate to Heinrich Himmler
