= Mainzer Berg (Dieburg) =

Hill in Hesse, Germany

Coordinates: 49°54′18″N 8°46′20″E

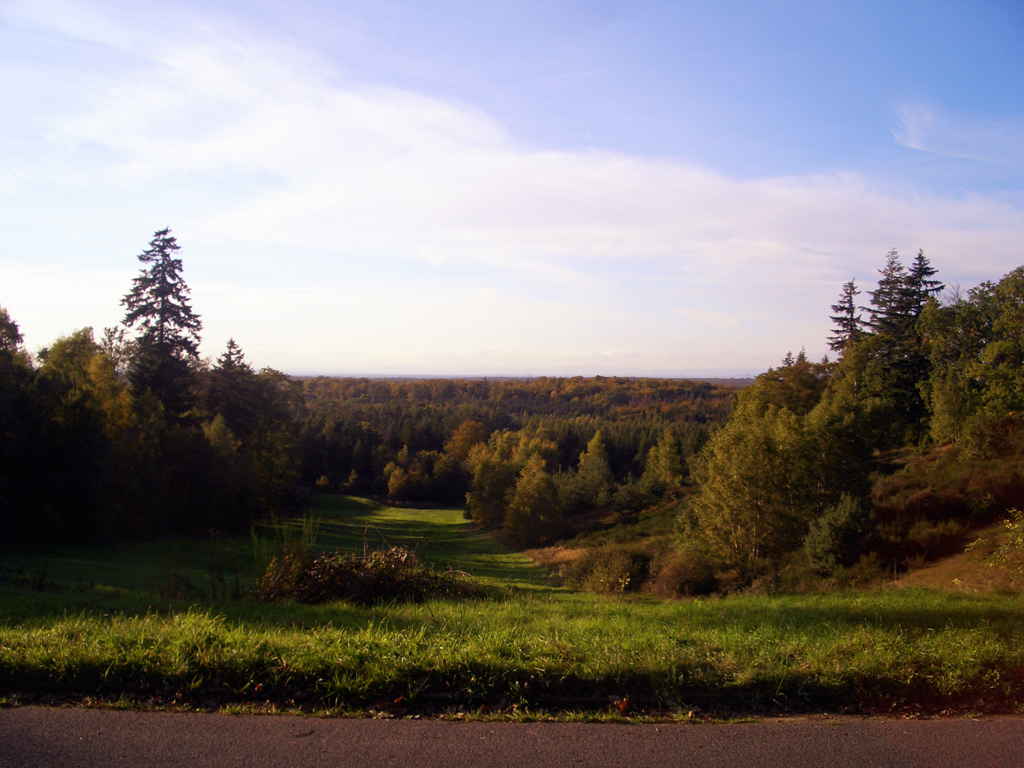
- View from Mainzer Berg towards west

Highest point
- Elevation: 227 m (745 ft)

Geography
- Location: Hesse, Germany

The Mainzer Berg is a forested hill between the cities of Darmstadt and Dieburg in the southern part of Hesse, Germany. It is part of the northernmost ridge of the Odenwald range and there is a telecommunication tower of 96 meter height on its top. Just two kilometres northwest of the hill is the UNESCO World Heritage Site Messel pit.
