= SbtB protein =

Membrane-associated protein slr1513
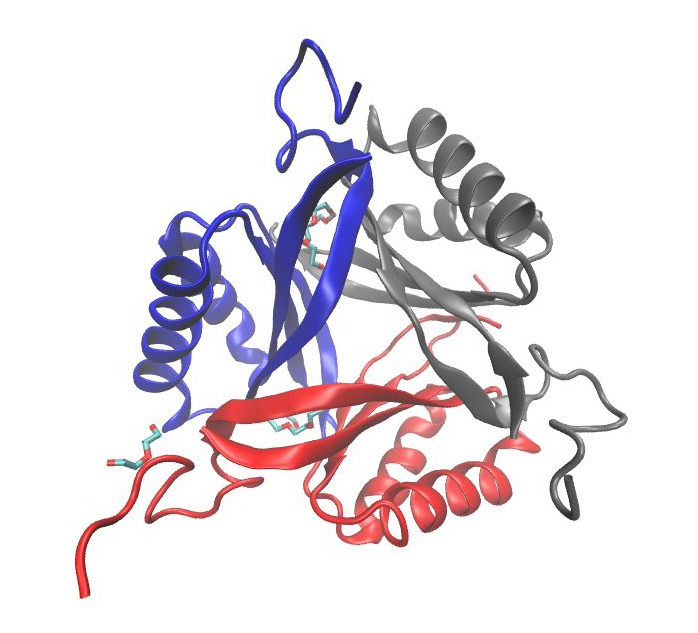
- Cartoon representation of SbtB (PDB: 5O3P done with VMD. Each color represents one of the 3 chains from the protein.

Identifiers
- Organism: Synechocystis sp.
- Symbol: slr1513
- Alt. symbols: SbtB
- UniProt: P73954
Search for
- Structures: Swiss-model
- Domains: InterPro

SbtB, which stands for sodium-bicarbonate-transporter B, is a protein found in bacteria. This small soluble protein has been classified as a new member of the P-II family that is involved in signal transduction. This protein has been demonstrated to participate in numerous processes including carbon sensing mechanisms in cyanobacteria.

== Carbon concentrating mechanisms ==
Most of the oxygen on planet earth derives from oxygenic photosynthesis. Some phototrophic prokaryotes such as cyanobacteria developed the ability to carry out oxygenic photosynthesis around 2.7 billion years ago. Moreover, 2 billion years ago planet earth was struck with "The Great Oxygenation event" also known as the oxygen crisis. Rising levels of atmospheric O_{2}, mainly due to oxygenic photosynthesis carried out by cyanobacteria nearly caused the mass death of anaerobic organisms. Having to face the evolutionary pressure of dropping ambient CO_{2} levels, cyanobacteria coped by evolving carbon concentrating mechanisms (CCM). Thus, these carbon concentrating mechanisms, also known as "DIC-pumps", are found in most photosynthetic microorganisms, such as unicellular green algae and cyanobacteria. These environmental adaptations vastly improve photosynthetic performance and survival. Indeed, this is achieved by accumulating intracellular inorganic carbon (Ci) providing elevated CO_{2} levels around the primary CO_{2} fixing enzyme, Rubisco.

Although previously, it was poorly understood how these photoprotic procaryotes could sense the fluctuations in inorganic carbon (Ci), scientists have discovered that a gene, SbtB, encoding a small soluble protein (SbtB) may have an important role in the process. SbtB participates in sensing fluctuations of CO_{2} concentrations in the environment and therefore adjusts CO_{2} fixation according to its surroundings.

This discovery is important as earth and all of its inhabitants depend on photosynthetic carbon dioxide fixation to form organic carbon. In addition, cyanobacteria are some of the oldest organisms on earth and any additional knowledge about how they operate internally offers insight on the earliest forms of life on earth. These procaryotic organisms may reveal information regarding challenging questions posed in regards to the origin of life.

== Structure ==
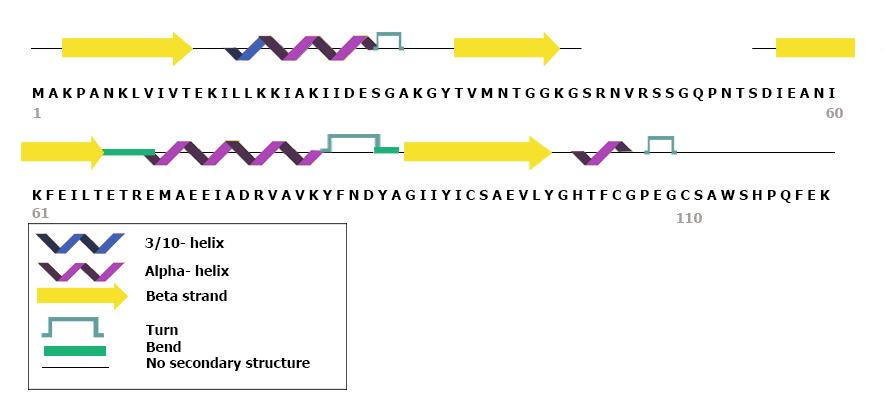
Graphical representation of SbtB's secondary structure and aminoacid. Based on SbtB's PDB webpage (5O3P).

'SbtB' is a homo trimeric protein. The monomer consists of 120 amino acid residues with molecular weight of 11875 Da. In addition, the monomer contains the following secondary structures:

- Beta-sheets (34% of the chain): there is a total of 4 strands composed by a total of 41 residues.
- Helical structures (26% of the chain): 4 helical structures. The first one consisting of a 3/10-helix and an alpha helix. The rest are exclusively made up by alpha helix structures.
- 3 T-turns. The flexible T loop is mostly disordered which is common in the P_{II} like proteins
- the beta sheets and alpha-helical structures are connected by loops.

A crystallographic structure of SbtB protein has been obtained from ScSbtB (Synechocystis sp.) The apo-ScSbtB shows a canonical ferredoxin-like fold in every subunit. As seen before, the molecular structure of the three subunits is identical. At the N terminus the first beta-sheets face the C terminus. The carboxyl terminus of the last cysteine forms a hydrogen bond with the N terminus. This interaction allows the stabilization of N and C terminus.

== Ligand binding ==
ScSbtB has shown to bind ATP, ADP and cAMP with dissociation constants (K_{d}) of 46, 19, and 11 μM respectively. The ring opened form of cAMP, AMP binds with much lower affinity.

== Gene ==
This protein is coded by the 'SbtB' gene, also called 'CMM_2535' gene. Assembled in the genome of the clavibacter michiganensis specie, It is a putative serine protease gene that belongs to the PTHR10795 family, which contains 23545 species.

It is assembled in the genome of the species Clavibacter michiganensis. This species is part of the family Microbacteriaceae, and has five subspecies. The subspecies that contains this gene in its genome is C. m. subsp. michiganensis. The latter is involved in bacterial wilt and canker of tomato.

It's located in the circular chromosome of this kind of microorganisms, which contains 2984 coding genes and 3,297,891 bps (base pairs). Specifically, sbtB is located between the 2,851,656-2,855,336 bps and is composed by six different motifs which are shown below.

=== Gene motifs ===
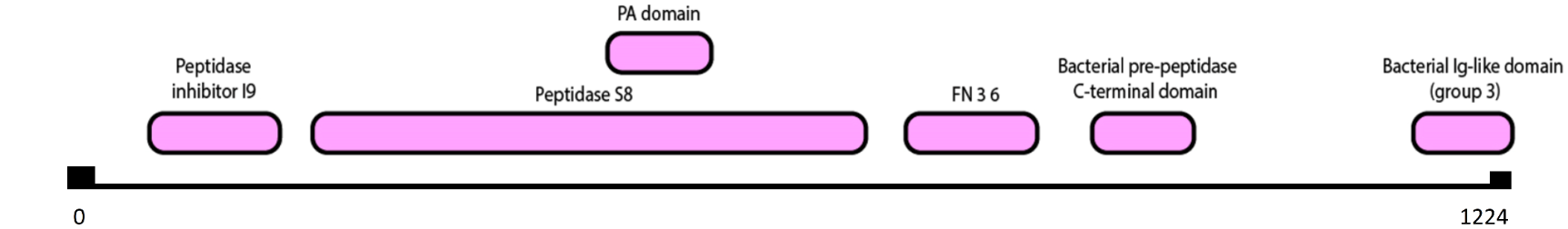
Graphical representation of the different sbtB motifs. It's based on the graphic of the reference [8].

In terms of the aminoacid sequence (1224 aminoacids), the sbtB gene has the following motifs:

Motif	From	To	E value
Peptidase Inhibitor I9	85	184	1.4e-11
Peptidase S8 (subtilase family)	213	694	6.3e-42
PA domain	485	559	1.5e-09
FN 3 6	735	828	5.9e-23
Bacterial pre-peptidase C-terminal domain	895	961	0.002
Bacterial Ig-like domain (group 3)	1146	1224	1.6e-11

=== Chromosome statistics ===
The circular chromosome of this bacteria specie has the following characteristics:

Length (bps)	3,297,891
Coding genes	2,984
Non coding genes	106
Pseudogenes	24

=== Transcript gene: sbtB-1 ===
It has a transcript gene called 'sbtB-1'. This specific transcript gene has 1 coding exon and is annotated with 23 domains. In term of statistics, it has a transcript length of 3681 bit/s and a translation length of 1226 residues. It is located between the 2,855,336 - 2,851,656 base pairs.

== Function ==
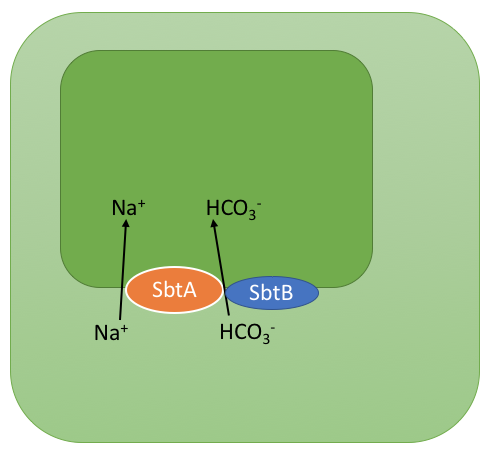
A simplified representation of the SbtA function as a sodium-dependent bicarbonate transporter into the cyanobacterial chloroplast and its relationship with the SbtB protein as its inhibitor by direct binding. SbtB tends to bind to the membrane when interacting with SbtA. This interaction is still being researched. Attention: this is a simplified model and therefore its sizes and locations are not representative of the interaction. It also does not acknowledge other transporters and regulators in the cyanobacterial cell.

=== Serine-type endopeptidase activity ===
SbtB is part of the S8A family inside the SB Clan as classified by the peptidise database MEROPS as well as uniprot. This family is characterised by their main function: the hydrolysis of peptide bonds. This is possible due to the catalytic triad in their active site of their protein sequence: Aspartate, Serine and Histidine (the triad is presented in this specific order in the S8 family). The serine nucleophile responsible for the cleave of peptide bonds is activated by the contribution of the acidic residue (Asp) and the basic residue (His).

=== Carbon concentration ===
SbtB is part of the cyanobacterial CCM (CO_{2}-concentrating mechanism) system. It acts as a post-translational regulator (inhibitor) of the SbtA protein (one of the three sodium-dependant bicarbonate (Na^{+}/HCO3^{−}) symporters in the cytoplasmic membrane) by binding to it during the dark hours to prevent rising levels of Na^{+} from growing and becoming toxic for the cyanobacterial cell. The SbtB protein is crucial for the photosynthetic process as it inhibits the SbtbA protein via direct interaction between both proteins. It is therefore a regulator of the Na^{+}/HCO_{3}^{−} transporter and is responsible for the cyanobacterial inorganic carbon response via cAMP sensing.

=== Importance in binding processes ===
SbtB not only takes part in the binding process of ATP and ADP, but is also the first ever known protein to bind the nucleotide cAMP (Cyclic adenosine monophosphate). This cyclic nucleotide is a single-phosphate nucleotide with a cyclic bond between the phosphate and the sugar, and is a derivative from ATP. Furthermore, cAMP is a key-signaling molecule in a wide range of processes including the state of carbon metabolism in all organisms. Until now cAMP was widely known for its important role in the maintenance of glucose balance, but in identifying SbtB researchers have discovered a new carbon sensing mechanism through cAMP. SbtB's role is gaining importance as research shows it is a direct participer in the sensing of inorganic carbon fluctuation in cyanobacteria.

== See also ==
- cAMP receptor protein
- Great oxygenation event
- Cyanobacteria
- Oxygenic photosynthesis
