= RHAG =

Protein-coding gene in the species Homo sapiens

Identifiers
- Aliases: RHAG, CD241, RH2, RH50A, Rh50, Rh50GP, SLC42A1, OHS, OHST, Rh-associated glycoprotein, Rh associated glycoprotein, RHNR
- External IDs: OMIM: 180297; MGI: 1202713; GeneCards: RHAG

Gene location (Human)
Chr.	Chromosome 6 (human)
Band	6p12.3	Start	49,605,175 bp
Band	6p12.3	End	49,636,839 bp

Gene location (Mouse)
Chr.	Chromosome 17 (mouse)
Band	17 B2|17 19.54 cM	Start	41,122,017 bp
Band	17 B2|17 19.54 cM	End	41,151,645 bp
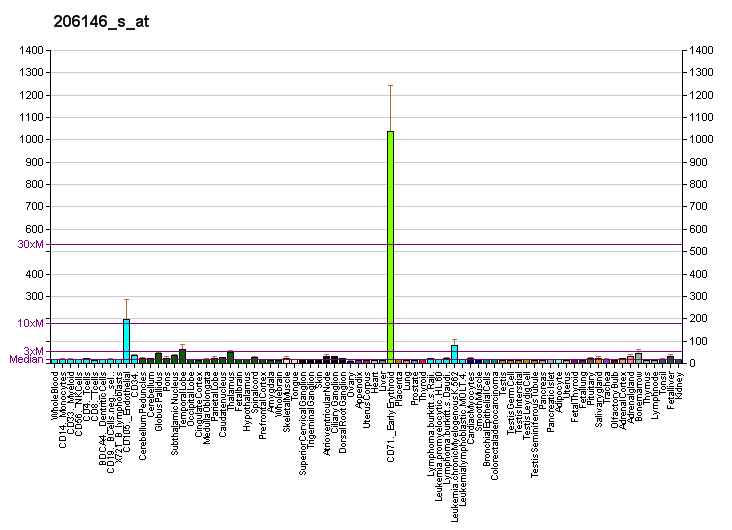

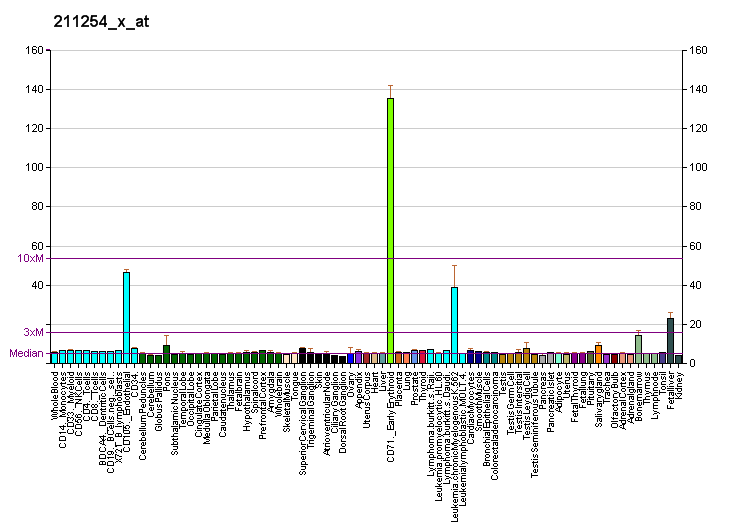

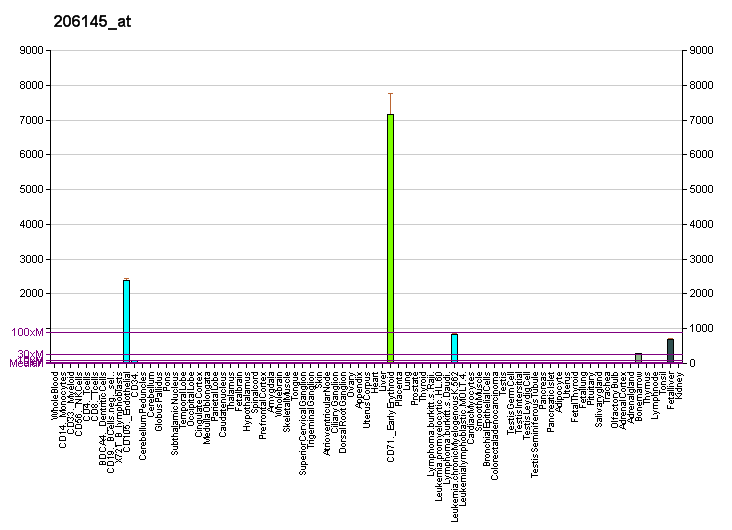
RNA expression pattern
Bgee	Human / Mouse (ortholog); Top expressed in: trabecular bone; bone marrow; bone marrow cell; testicle; blood; right auricle of heart; monocyte; amniotic fluid; ventricle of the heart; cervix / Top expressed in: fetal liver hematopoietic progenitor cell; tibiofemoral joint; human fetus; body of femur; spleen; bone marrow; blood; tail of embryo; yolk sac; genital tubercle; More reference expression data
BioGPS	More reference expression data
Gene ontology
Molecular function	ankyrin binding; carbon dioxide transmembrane transporter activity; ammonium transmembrane transporter activity; leak channel activity
Cellular component	integral component of membrane; plasma membrane; integral component of plasma membrane; membrane
Biological process	multicellular organismal iron ion homeostasis; bicarbonate transport; organic cation transport; carbon dioxide transport; erythrocyte development; cellular ion homeostasis; carbon dioxide transmembrane transport; ammonium transmembrane transport
Sources:Amigo / QuickGO
Orthologs
Databases	NCBI: entry; OMA: entry
Species	Human	Mouse
Entrez	6005	19743
Ensembl	ENSG00000112077	ENSMUSG00000023926
UniProt	Q02094	Q9QUT0
RefSeq (mRNA)	NM_000324	NM_011269
RefSeq (protein)	NP_000315	NP_035399
Location (UCSC)	Chr 6: 49.61 – 49.64 Mb	Chr 17: 41.12 – 41.15 Mb
PubMed search
- Wikidata
View/Edit Human	View/Edit Mouse

Rh-associated glycoprotein (RHAG) is an ammonia transporter protein that in humans is encoded by the RHAG gene. RHAG has also recently been designated CD241 (cluster of differentiation 241). Mutations in the RHAG gene can cause stomatocytosis.

== Function ==
The Rh blood group antigens (MIM 111700) are associated with human erythrocyte membrane proteins of approximately 30 kD, the so-called Rh30 polypeptides. Heterogeneously glycosylated membrane proteins of 50 and 45 kD, the Rh50 glycoproteins, are coprecipitated with the Rh30 polypeptides on immunoprecipitation with anti-Rh-specific mono- and polyclonal antibodies. The Rh antigens appear to exist as a multisubunit complex of CD47 (MIM 601028), LW (MIM 111250), glycophorin B (MIM 111740), and play a critical role in the Rh50 glycoprotein [supplied by OMIM].

== Clinical diagnostic ==
Clinical testing in patient care for RhAG antigens follows published minimum quality and operational requirements, similar to red cell genotyping for any of the other recognized blood group systems. Molecular analysis can identify gene variants (alleles) that may affect RhAG antigens expression on the red cell membrane.

== Interactions ==
RHAG has been shown to interact with ANK1.

== See also ==
- Rh deficiency syndrome
