= Blood Transfusion (journal) =

Medical journal

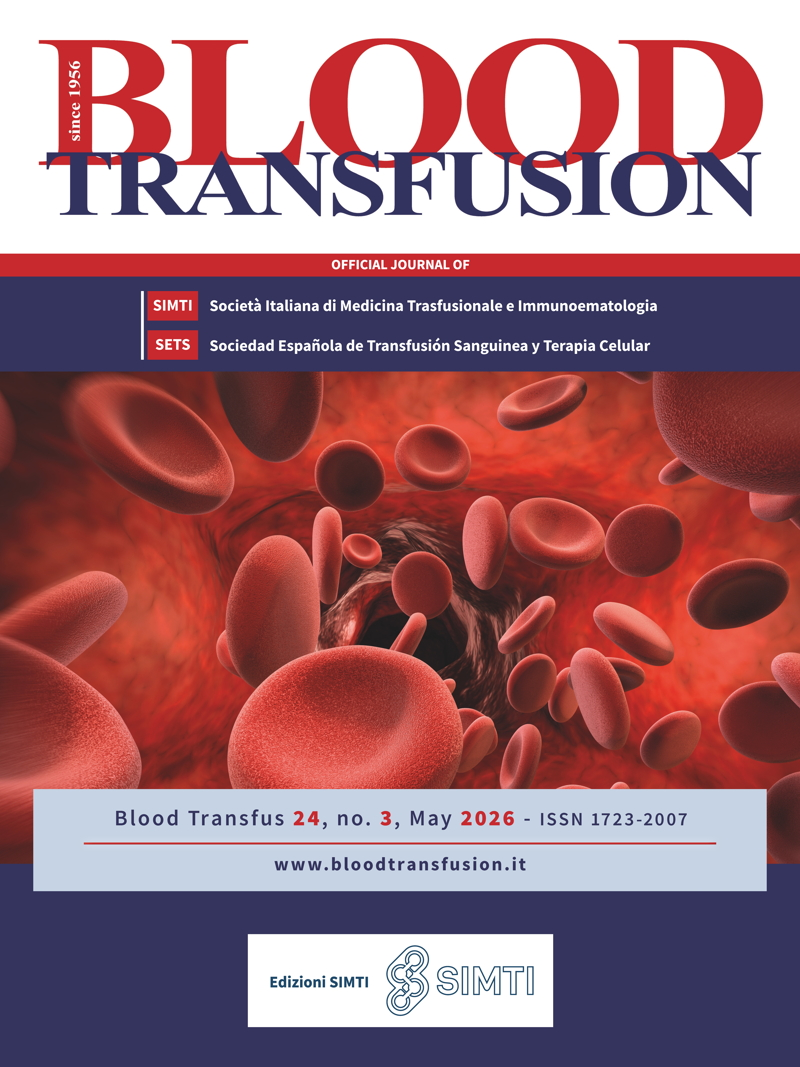
- Discipline: Transfusion medicine, Immunohematology, Hemostasis, Thrombosis, Red cell genotyping
- Language: English
- Edited by: Serelina Coluzzi

Publication details
- History: 1956–present
- Publisher: SIMTIPRO Srl on behalf of Società Italiana di Medicina Trasfusionale e Immunoematologia (SIMTI)
- Frequency: Bimonthly
- Impact factor: 2.3 (2024)

Standard abbreviations
- ISO 4: Blood Transfus.
- NLM: Blood Transfus

Indexing
- ISSN: 1723-2007 (print); 2385-2070 (web)
- LCCN: 2005243953

Links
- Journal homepage; Online archive

Blood Transfusion is an English-language, bimonthly peer-reviewed academic journal. It is published by the Italian Society of Transfusion Medicine and Immunohematology (Società Italiana di Medicina Trasfusionale e Immunoematologia, SIMTI). As of 2024, the editor-in-chief is Serelina Coluzzi.

== Scope ==
As an online open-access publication, Blood Transfusion covers a range of topics including blood donation and donor recruitment; immunohematology; transfusion medicine, patient blood management, collection, production and storage of blood components, transfusion transmitted diseases, hemovigilance, therapeutic apheresis, cellular therapy and regenerative medicine, hematopoietic stem cell transplantation and cord blood banking, immunogenetics, hemostasis and thrombosis, hematology, organization and quality systems in transfusion medicine, legal and ethical aspects of transfusion medicine.

== Abstracting and indexing ==
The journal is indexed and abstracted in:

- EMBASE
- Index Medicus/MEDLINE/PubMed
- Science Citation Index Expanded
- Scopus

According to the Journal Citation Reports, the journal's impact factor for 2024 is 2.3.

== History ==
Blood Transfusion was founded in 1956 with Lorenzo Lapponi as its founding editor-in-chief.

== Past Editors-in-Chief ==
- Lorenzo Lapponi, 1956–1964
- Carlo Alberto Lang, 1965–1966
- Roberto Venturelli, 1967–1968
- Rosalino Sacchi, 1969–1978
- Giorgio Reali, 1979–2006
- Claudio Velati, 2007–2015
- Giancarlo Maria Liumbruno, 2015–2019
- Luca Mascaretti, 2020–2024
