= Pii nitrogen regulatory proteins =

Nitrogen regulatory protein P-II
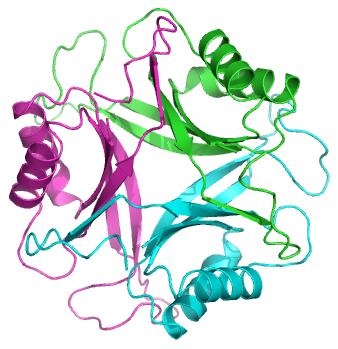
- GlnB protein from E.coli. PDB 2pii The GlnB protein in E. coli is 68% identical to GlnK.

Identifiers
- Symbol: P-II
- Pfam: PF00543
- Pfam clan: CL0089
- InterPro: IPR002187
- SMART: SM00938
- PROSITE: PDOC00439
- SCOP2: 1pil / SCOPe / SUPFAM
Available protein structures:
- PDB: IPR002187 PF00543 (ECOD; PDBsum)
- AlphaFold: IPR002187; PF00543

The P_{II} family comprises a group of widely distributed signal transduction proteins found in nearly all Bacteria and also present in Archaea and in the chloroplasts of Algae and plants. P_{II} form barrel-like homotrimers with a flexible loop, namely T-loop, emerging from each subunit. P_{II} proteins have extraordinary sensory properties; they can exist in a vast range of structural status accordingly to the levels of ATP, ADP and 2-oxogluratate. These metabolites interact allosterically with P_{II} in three conserved binding sites located in the lateral cavity between each P_{II} subunit. ATP and ADP bind competitively to the nucleotide binding whereas the 2-oxoglutarate only interacts with P_{II} in the presence of MgATP.

In Proteobacteria, P_{II} proteins are also subject to a cycle of reversible posttranslational modification (Huergo et al., 2013). Under a low nitrogen regime, the low intracellular glutamine level triggers the uridylyl-transferase activity of the bi-functional GlnD enzyme promoting the uridylylation of a conserved Tyr-51 located at the top the P_{II} T-loop. Conversely, under a high nitrogen regime, accumulation of intracellular glutamine triggers the uridylyl-removing activity of GlnD and P_{II} accumulates in its non-modified form (Huergo et al., 2013).

The ability of P_{II} to sense important metabolites and integrate signals deriving from energy status (ATP and ADP ratio), carbon (2-oxogluratate) and nitrogen (glutamine and 2-oxoglutarate) levels were capitalized during evolution such that P_{II} can act as a dissociable regulatory subunit of a range of transporters, transcriptional regulators and enzymes.

== Structure ==
PII proteins exist in trimers in vivo and bind ATP in a cleft between the subunits. There are two flexible loops call the B-loop and T-loop which are involved in regulation of the protein. The T-loop contains a conserved tyrosine which is the site of uridyl attachment.

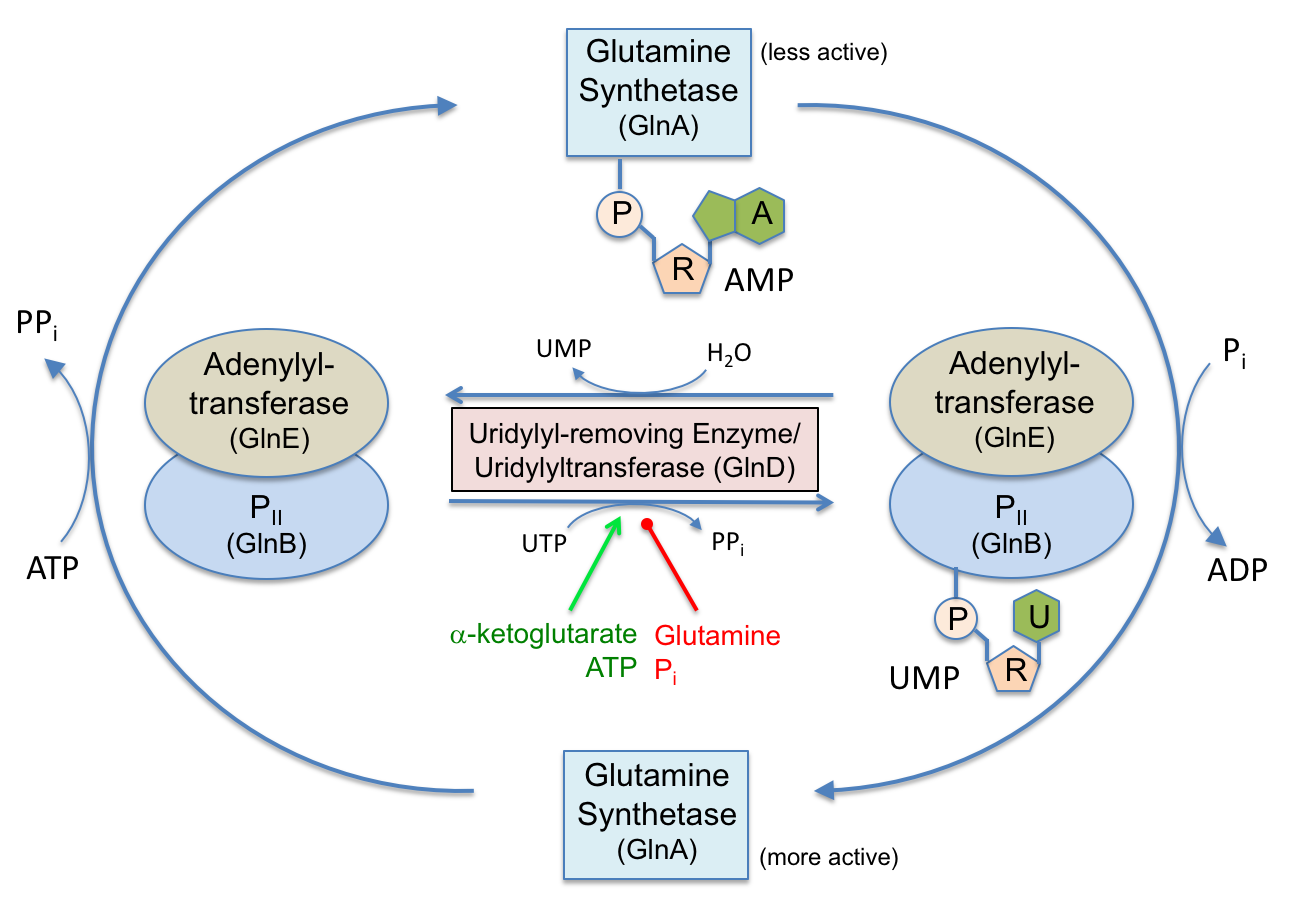
Regulation of bacterial glutamine synthase (GlnA) by uridylylation of P_{ii} proteins. Uridylyltransferase (GlnD) uridylylates the regulatory PII protein (GlnB) which determines whether adenylyltransferase (GlnE) adenylylates or deadenylylates glutamine synthase. The protein names are those in E. coli. Homologs in other bacteria may have different names.

== Role in nitrogen metabolism ==
Following nitrogen starvation, increased intra-cellular concentrations of ammonia cause the de-uridylylation of GlnK. This then binds directly to the ammonia channel AmtB to block ammonia conduction. PII proteins such as SbtB are also implicated in carbon metabolism regulation, these proteins are able to control the activity of Acetyl-CoA carboxylase in plants, algae and Bacteria
