= RHBG =

Protein found in humans

Identifiers
- Aliases: RHBG, SLC42A2, Rh family B glycoprotein (gene/pseudogene), Rh family B glycoprotein
- External IDs: OMIM: 607079; MGI: 1927379; GeneCards: RHBG

Gene location (Human)
| Chr. | Chromosome 1 (human) |
| Band | 1q22 | Start | 156,369,211 bp |
| Band | 1q22 | End | 156,385,219 bp |

Gene location (Mouse)
| Chr. | Chromosome 3 (mouse) |
| Band | 3 F1|3 38.78 cM | Start | 88,150,181 bp |
| Band | 3 F1|3 38.78 cM | End | 88,162,016 bp |
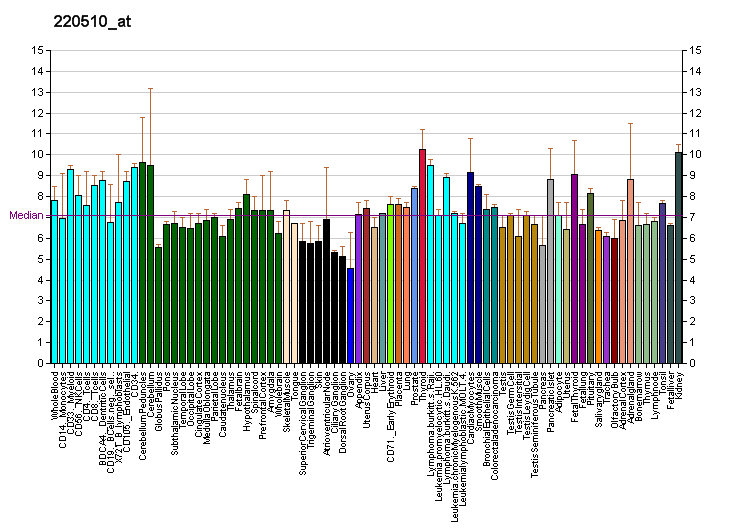
RNA expression pattern
| Bgee | Human / Mouse (ortholog); Top expressed in: cerebellar cortex; cerebellar hemisphere; right hemisphere of cerebellum; human kidney; left ovary; renal medulla; right lobe of liver; right ovary; skin of leg; testicle / Top expressed in: right kidney; inner renal medulla; collecting duct of renal tubule; cortical collecting duct; lip; human kidney; glans of clitoris; esophagus; connecting tubule; embryo; More reference expression data |
| BioGPS | More reference expression data |
Gene ontology
| Molecular function | ankyrin binding; ammonium transmembrane transporter activity |
| Cellular component | spectrin-associated cytoskeleton; integral component of membrane; anchored component of plasma membrane; integral component of plasma membrane; cytoplasmic vesicle membrane; membrane; cytoplasmic vesicle; plasma membrane; basolateral plasma membrane |
| Biological process | ammonium transmembrane transport; organic cation transport; transepithelial ammonium transport |
Sources:Amigo / QuickGO
Orthologs
| Databases | NCBI: entry; OMA: entry |
| Species | Human | Mouse |
| Entrez | 57127 | 58176 |
| Ensembl | ENSG00000132677 | ENSMUSG00000104445 |
| UniProt | Q9H310 | Q8BUX5 |
| RefSeq (mRNA) | NM_001256395; NM_001256396; NM_020407 | NM_021375 |
| RefSeq (protein) | NP_001243324; NP_001243325; NP_065140 | NP_067350 |
| Location (UCSC) | Chr 1: 156.37 – 156.39 Mb | Chr 3: 88.15 – 88.16 Mb |
| PubMed search |
- Wikidata
| View/Edit Human | View/Edit Mouse |

Rh family, B glycoprotein, also known as RHBG, is an ammonia transporter protein which in humans is encoded by the RHBG gene.

== Function ==
RHBG and RHCG are non-erythroid members of the Rhesus (Rh) protein family that are mainly expressed in the kidney and belong to the methylammonium-ammonium permease/ammonia transporters superfamily. Rh family proteins are all predicted to be transmembrane proteins with 12 membrane spanning domains and intracytoplasmic N- and C-termini.
