= Hereditary stomatocytosis =

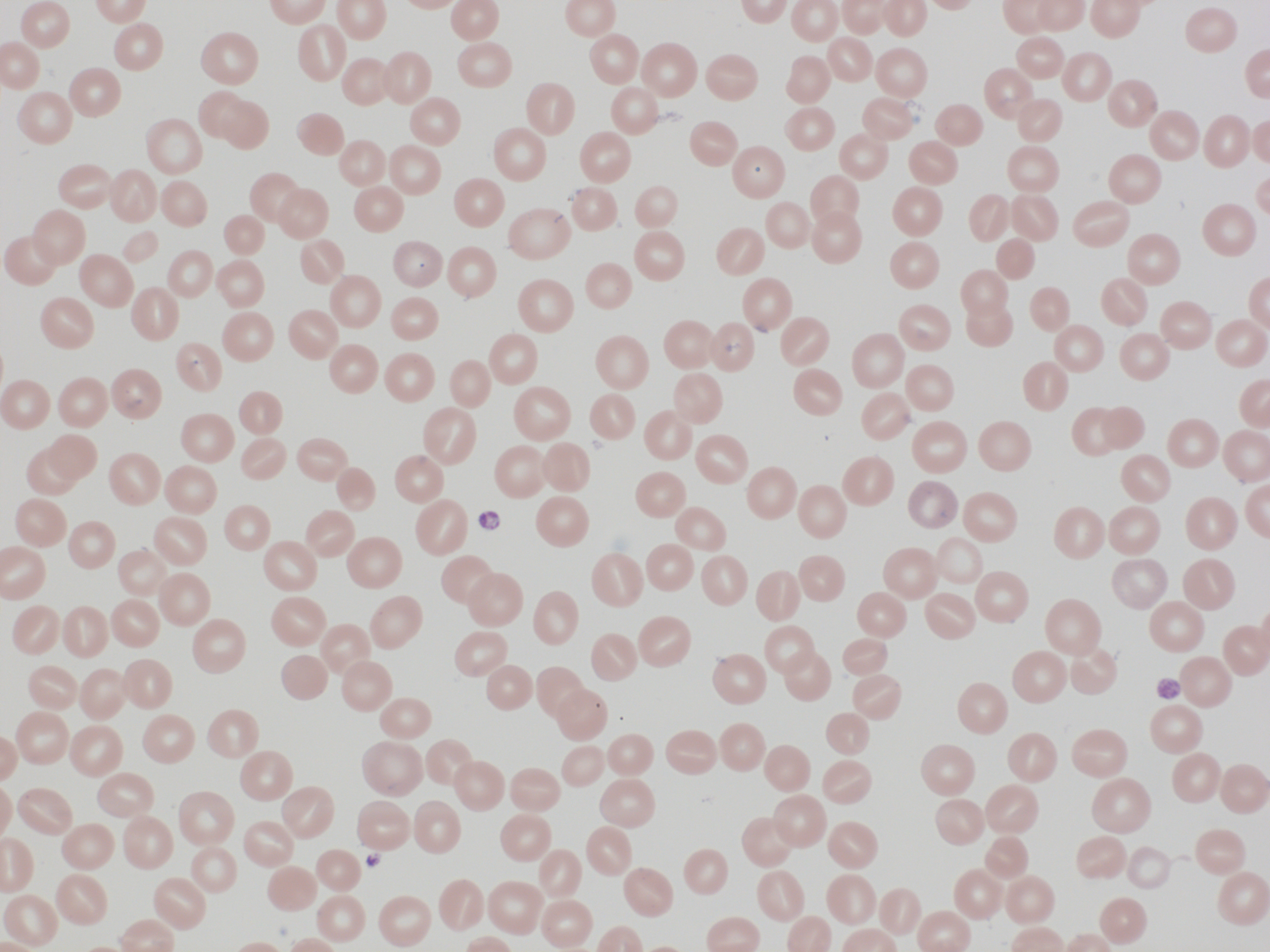
- Stomatocytes
- Specialty: Hematology

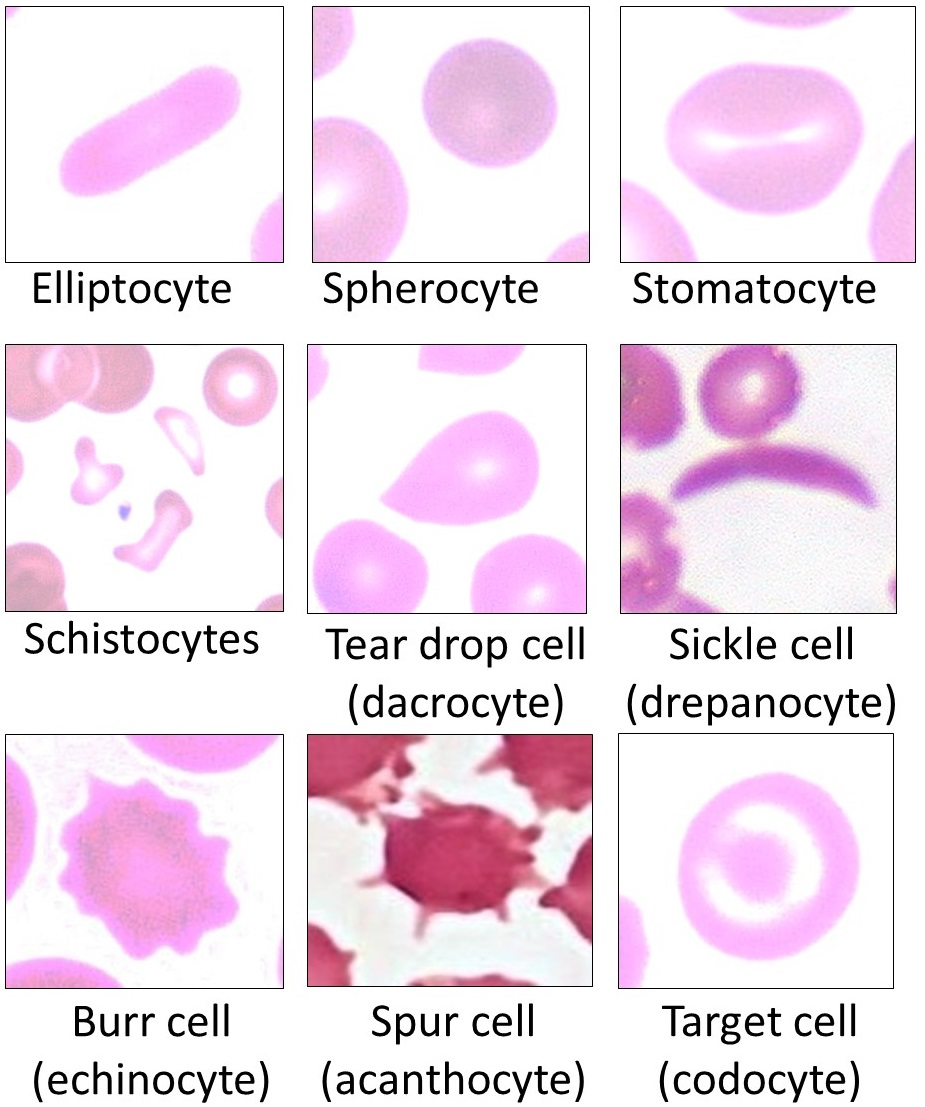
Stomatocyte compared to other forms of poikilocytosis.

Hereditary stomatocytosis describes a number of inherited, mostly autosomal dominant human conditions which affect the red blood cell and create the appearance of a slit-like area of central pallor (stomatocyte) among erythrocytes on peripheral blood smear. The erythrocytes' cell membranes may abnormally 'leak' sodium and/or potassium ions, causing abnormalities in cell volume. Hereditary stomatocytosis should be distinguished from acquired causes of stomatocytosis, including dilantin toxicity and alcoholism, as well as artifact from the process of preparing peripheral blood smears.

== Signs and symptoms ==
Stomatocytosis may present with signs and symptoms consistent with hemolytic anemia as a result of extravascular hemolysis and often intravascular hemolysis. These include fatigue and pallor, as well as signs of jaundice, splenomegaly and gallstone formation from prolonged hemolysis. Certain cases of hereditary stomatocytosis associated with genetic syndromes have additional symptoms that are unrelated to the hemolytic anemia.

== Pathophysiology ==
The two varieties of stomatocytosis classified with respect to cellular hydration status are overhydrated (hydrocytosis) and dehydrated (xerocytosis). Hereditary xerocytosis is characterized by autosomal dominant mutations in PIEZO1, which encodes a cation channel whose mechanosensitive properties enable erythrocytes to deform as they pass through narrow capillaries by decreasing their intracellular volume. More rarely, hereditary xerocytosis may be caused by mutations in KCNN4, which encodes a calcium ion-sensitive potassium channel that mediates the potassium efflux triggered by a rise in intracellular Ca^{2+} via activated PIEZO1 channels. Hereditary xerocytosis occurs more commonly in African populations, and it exhibits complex interactions with other hereditary alterations of red blood cells, including sickle cell disease and malaria resistance.

Osmosis leads to the red blood cell having a constant tendency to swell and burst. This tendency is countered by manipulating the flow of sodium and potassium ions. A 'pump' forces sodium out of the cell and potassium in, and this action is balanced by a process called 'the passive leak'. In overhydrated hereditary stomatocytoses, the passive leak is increased and the erythrocyte becomes swamped with salt and water. The affected erythrocytes have increased osmotic fragility. Haemolytic anaemia results. For as yet unknown reasons, the cells take on the shape of a cup, with a 'mouth-shaped' (stoma) area of central pallor.

Overhydrated hereditary stomatocytosis is frequently linked to mutations in genes that encode components of the band 3 complex, such as RHAG. It is the altered band 3 protein complex which mediates the cation leaks that are characteristic of hydrocytotic hereditary stomatocytosis.Rare cases of hereditary spherocytosis can occur without cation leaks. These include cases of phytosterolemia nonleaky stomatocytosis, a disorder of lipid metabolism associated with mutations in ABCG5 and/or ABCG8, which encode sterol transporters. The resulting abnormal sterol composition of erythrocyte cell membranes causes them to appear as deformed stomatocytes on peripheral blood smear.

== Diagnosis ==
Ektacytometry may be helpful in distinguishing different subtypes of hereditary stomatocytosis.

=== Variants ===
Haematologists have identified a number of variants. These can be classified as below.

- Overhydrated hereditary stomatocytosis
- Dehydrated hereditary stomatocytosis (hereditary xerocytosis; hereditary hyperphosphatidylcholine haemolytic anaemia)
- Dehydrated hereditary stomatocytosis with perinatal edema and/or pseudohyperkalemia
- Cryohydrocytosis
- 'Blackburn' variant
- Familial pseudohyperkalaemia (not associated with hemolytic anemia)

There are other families that do not fall neatly into any of these classifications.

Stomatocytosis is also found as a hereditary disease in Alaskan Malamute and Miniature Schnauzer dogs.

== Treatment ==
At present there is no specific treatment. Many patients with hemolytic anemia take folic acid (vitamin B_{9}) since the greater turnover of cells consumes this vitamin. During crises transfusion may be required. Clotting problems can occur for which anticoagulation may be needed. Unlike hereditary spherocytosis, splenectomy is contraindicated.
