= Immunohaematology =

Branch of hematology and transfusion medicine

Immunohematology is a branch of hematology and transfusion medicine which studies antigen-antibody reactions and analogous phenomena as they relate to the pathogenesis and clinical manifestations of blood disorders. A person employed in this field is referred to as an immunohematologist or colloquially as a blood banker. Their day-to-day duties include blood typing, cross-matching and antibody identification.

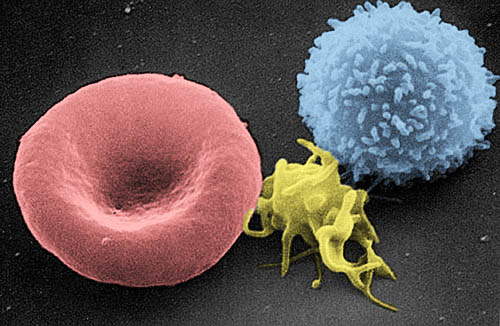

Immunohematology and Transfusion Medicine is a medical post graduate specialty in many countries. The specialist Immunohematology and Transfusion Physician provides expert opinion for difficult transfusions, massive transfusions, incompatibility work up, therapeutic plasmapheresis, cellular therapy, irradiated blood therapy, leukoreduced and washed blood products, stem cell procedures, platelet rich plasma therapies, HLA and cord blood banking. Other research avenues are in the field of stem cell researches, regenerative medicine and cellular therapy.

Immunohematology is one of the specialized branches of medical science. It deals with the concepts and clinical 2 techniques related to modern transfusion therapy. Efforts to save human lives by transfusing blood have been recorded for several centuries. The era of blood transfusion, however, really began when William Harvey described the circulation of blood in 1616.

== See also ==
- Clinical laboratory scientist
- Transfusion medicine
