= Red Hat Certification Program =

Information technology qualifications

Red Hat, an IBM subsidiary specializing in computer software, offers different level of certification programs, most of which specialize in system administration. Certifications can be validated through Red Hat's webpage, and expire after 3 years.

== Certifications ==
=== Red Hat Certified System Administrator (RHCSA) ===
RHCSA is a professional certification covering core system administration skills in Red Hat Enterprise Linux environments. It is obtained by passing the performance-based EX200 examination, which is based on Red Hat Enterprise Linux 10. The examination covers command-line tools, shell scripting, software and storage management, networking, user administration, security and basic container management.

Red Hat list completion of Red Hat System Administration I and II, the RHCSA Rapid Track course, or comparable experience administering Red Hat Enterprise Red Hat Enterprise Linux as preparation for the examination. Red Hat certifications remain current for three years.

The RHCSA certification was introduced in November 2010 as a replacement for the Red Hat Certified Technician certification. In May 2026, Red Hat reorganised its certification programme into five levels and classified RHCSA as a Level 2 certification.

The 2009 figure of 30,000 RHCT holders may be retained as historical information, but it is not useful as a current certification statistic.

=== Red Hat Certified Engineer (RHCE) ===
Self-titled "the flagship" certification, RHCE is a mid- to advanced-level certification that builds on topics covered in the RHCSA certification to include more advanced topics such as security and installing common enterprise networking (IP) services. The certification has a heavy focus on automation using Ansible. To achieve the RHCE certification, the student must pass the RHCSA exam, EX200, and in addition EX294, a 4-hour hands-on lab exam. Red Hat recommends preparing for the exam by taking courses in Linux essentials (RH124), Linux administration (RH134), and Linux networking and security (RH254) if one does not have previous experience. Previous real-world experience is also advised.

RHCE was the first Red Hat certificate launched, in 1999. As of July 2009 there were 40,000 RHCEs. It was named the Hottest Certification for 2006 by CertCities.com.

=== Red Hat Certified Architect (RHCA) ===
Self-titled "the capstone certificate", RHCA is the most complete certificate in the program, adding an enterprise-level focus.

There are concentrations inside the RHCA on which a candidate may choose to focus, however choosing to do so is not required. The focuses are:

- Datacenter: skills with tasks common in an on-premises datacenter
- Cloud: skills with tasks common to cloud infrastructure
- Devops: skills and knowledge in technologies and practices that can accelerate the process of moving applications and updates from development through the build and test processes and on to production
- Application Development: skills in enterprise application development, integration, and architecture
- Application Platform: skills with tasks common for building and managing tools and applications

RHCA was launched in 2005.

=== Red Hat Certified Virtualization Administrator (RHCVA) ===
RHCVA is a certification that focuses on Virtualization administration. To achieve the RHCVA certification the student must pass EX318, a 3-hour hands-on lab exam. There is no prerequisite for the exam, but Red Hat recommends preparing for the exam by taking the respective course, RH318, and by obtaining the RHCSA certification described above. The exam also requires knowledge in using and installing Microsoft Windows operating systems.

RHCVA was Launched in November 2009.

=== JBoss Certified Application Administrator (JBCAA) ===
JBCAA is a certification that focuses on managing the JBoss Enterprise Application Platform. To achieve the JBCAA certification the student must pass EX248, a four-hour hands-on lab exam. There is no prerequisite for the exam, but Red Hat recommends preparing for the exam by taking course JB248, a four-day course in JBoss application administration.

JBCAA was Launched in September 2009.

=== Examination required for each certification ===
Name	RHCSA	RHCE	RHCA	RHCA: Application platform	RHCA: Cloud	RHCA: Datacenter	RHCA: Enterprise application development	RHCA: DevOps
EX125 - Red Hat Certified Specialist in Ceph Storage Administration exam	No	No	Any 5	No	No	No	No	No
EX200 - Red Hat® Certified System Administrator (RHCSA) Exam	Yes	Yes	Yes	Yes	Yes	Yes	No	Yes
EX210 - Red Hat Certified System Administrator in Red Hat OpenStack exam	No	No	Any 5	No	Any 5	No	No	No
EX220 - Red Hat Certificate of Expertise in Hybrid Cloud Management exam (retired)	No	No	Any 5	Yes	Any 5	No	No	No
EX225 - Red Hat Certified JBoss Developer (RHCJD) exam	No	No	No	No	No	No	Yes	No
EX236 - Red Hat Certificate of Expertise in Hybrid Cloud Storage exam	No	No	Any 5	No	Any 5	Any 5	No	No
EX240 - Red Hat Certified Specialist in API Management	No	No	Any 5	No	No	No	No	No
EX248 - Red Hat Certified JBoss Administrator exam	No	No	Any 5	Yes	No	Any 5	Any 5	No
EX270 - Red Hat Certificate of Expertise in Container Management exam (retired)	No	No	Any 5	No	Any 5	No	No	Yes
EX276 - Red Hat Certificate of Expertise in Containerized Application Development exam (retired)	No	No	Any 5	No	No	No	No	Yes
EX280 - Red Hat Certified Specialist in OpenShift Administration exam	No	No	Any 5	Yes	Any 5	No	No	Yes
EX297 - Red Hat Certificate of Expertise in Persistence exam	No	No	Any 5	No	No	No	Any 5	No
EX300 - Red Hat Certified Engineer (RHCE) Exam	No	Yes	Yes	Yes	Yes	Yes	No	Yes
EX310 - Red Hat Certified Engineer in Red Hat OpenStack	No	No	Any 5	No	Any 5	No	No	No
EX318 - Red Hat Certified Specialist in Virtualization exam	No	No	Any 5	No	Any 5	Any 5	No	No
EX342 - Red Hat Enterprise Linux Diagnostics and Troubleshooting exam	No	No	Any 5	No	No	Any 5	No	No
EX362 - Red Hat Certified Specialist in Identity Management exam	No	No	Any 5	No	No	No	No	No
EX401 - Red Hat Certificate of Expertise in Enterprise Deployment and Systems Management Exam (retired)	No	No	Any 5	No	Any 5	Any 5	No	No
EX403 - Red Hat Certified Specialist in Deployment and Systems Management exam	No	No	Any 5	No	No	No	No	No
EX405 - Red Hat Certified Specialist in Configuration Management (retired)	No	No	Any 5	No	Any 5	Any 5	No	Yes
EX407 - Red Hat Certificate of Expertise in Ansible Automation (retired)	No	No	Any 5	No	Any 5	No	No	Yes
EX413 - Red Hat Certificate of Expertise in Server Hardening (retired)	No	No	Any 5	No	No	Any 5	No	No
EX415 - Red Hat Certified Specialist in Security: Linux exam	No	No	Any 5	No	No	No	No	No
EX421 - Red Hat Certified Specialist in Camel Development exam	No	No	Any 5	No	No	No	Any 5	No
EX425 - Red Hat Certified Specialist in Security: Containers and OpenShift Container Platform exam	No	No	Any 5	No	No	No	No	No
EX427 - Red Hat Certified Specialist in Business Process Design exam	No	No	Any 5	No	No	No	Any 5	No
EX436 - Red Hat Certificate of Expertise in Clustering and Storage Management Exam	No	No	Any 5	No	No	Any 5	No	No
EX440 – Red Hat Certified Specialist in Messaging Administration exam	No	No	Any 5	No	No	No	No	No
EX442 - Red Hat Certificate of Expertise in Performance Tuning Exam	No	No	Any 5	No	No	Any 5	No	No
EX447 - Red Hat Certified Specialist in Advanced Automation: Ansible Best Practices	No	No	Any 5	No	No	No	No	No
EX450 - Red Hat Certificate of Expertise in Data Virtualization exam	No	No	Any 5	Yes	No	No	Any 5	No
EX453 - Red Hat Certificate of Expertise in Fast-Cache Application Development	No	No	Any 5	No	No	No	Any 5	No
EX465 - Red Hat Certificate of Expertise in Business Rules exam	No	No	Any 5	No	No	No	Any 5	No
Name	RHCSA	RHCE	RHCA	RHCA: Application platform	RHCA: Cloud	RHCA: Datacenter	RHCA: Enterprise application development	RHCA: DevOps

== See also ==
- CompTIA Linux+
- Linux Professional Institute certifications
