= Dieburg =

City in Hesse, Germany

- Town
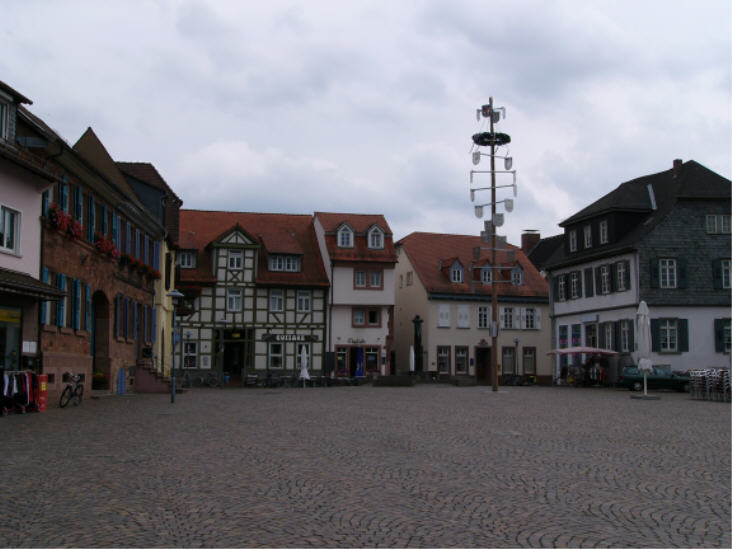
- Market square

- Flag Coat of arms

- Location of Dieburg within Darmstadt-Dieburg district
- Interactive map of Dieburg
- Location within Germany Location within Hesse
- Coordinates: 49°54′N 08°51′E
- Country: Germany
- State: Hesse
- Admin. region: Darmstadt
- District: Darmstadt-Dieburg

Government
  - Mayor (2023–29): Frank Haus (Ind.)

Area
  - Total: 23.08 km^{2} (8.91 sq mi)
- Elevation: 144 m (472 ft)

Population (2025-12-31)
  - Total: 15,791
  - Density: 684.2/km^{2} (1,772/sq mi)
- Time zone: UTC+01:00 (CET)
  - Summer (DST): UTC+02:00 (CEST)
- Postal codes: 64801–64807
- Dialling codes: 06071
- Vehicle registration: DA, DI
- Website: www.dieburg.com

Dieburg (German pronunciation: [ˈdiːˌbʊʁk]) is a small city in southern Hesse, Germany. It was the seat of the district ("Kreis") of Dieburg until 1977, when it became part of the new district of Darmstadt-Dieburg.

== History ==
Early mentions of Dieburg date back to the early 13th century, with various spellings of its name attested. The city's name is derived from the Middle High German words diot, meaning "people", and burg, meaning "castle". Therefore, Dieburg refers to the castle of the people, located in the centre of the medieval town. The town's centre largely consists of historical timber-framed houses from medieval times. The Dieburg Museum, located in the Fechenbach stately home, displays archeological findings. Of special interest is a Roman temple relief of Mithras and a dyer's workshop. The coat of arms of the town Dieburg shows Martin of Tours. A cultural highlight is the yearly carnival, including a carnival parade that is completely based on honorary posts.

== Geography ==
Dieburg is situated north of mountain range Odenwald in southern Hesse. The Gersprenz (47 km), tributary to the Main, flows through Dieburg. The city of Darmstadt is located 15 kilometres to the West, the city of Frankfurt on the Main is located around 40 kilometres to the North of Dieburg.

== Mayors ==
- 1976–1982: Stephan Schmitt (CDU)
- 1983–1987: Helmut Aelken (CDU)
- 1987–2005: Peter Christ (CDU)
- 2005–2017: Werner Thomas, Sc.D. (first independent, since 2015 CDU), Thomas was reelected in March 2011 with 70,7 % of the votes.
- since 2017: Frank Haus (independent)

== Twin towns – sister cities ==
Dieburg is twinned with:

- Aubergenville, France (1975)
- Reinsdorf, Germany (1990)
- Mladá Boleslav, Czech Republic (1997)

== Notable people ==
- Klaus Schrodt (born 1946), aerobatics pilot, various titles as German, European and World Champion
- Bertram Schmitt (born 1958), professor of law, Judge of the Federal Court of Justice and the International Criminal Court
- Willy A. Flegel (born 1960), professor of transfusion medicine and Immunohematology
- Jörg Roßkopf (born 1969), table tennis player, grew up in Münster (near Dieburg)
- Marvin Schwäbe (born 1995), footballer

== Seal of Dieburg ==
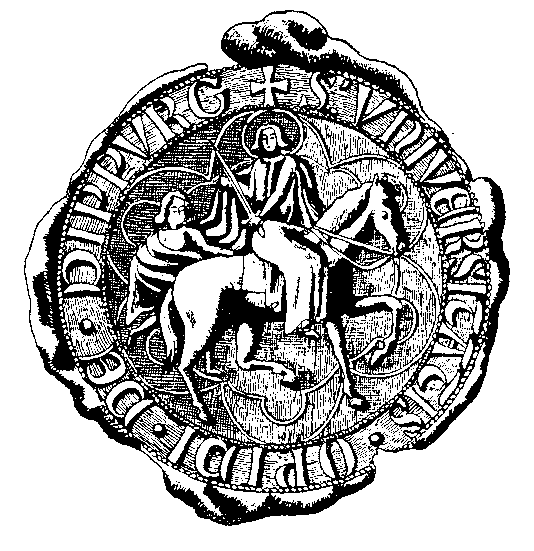
The oldest seal of Dieburg. Two of these seals still exist today. They were made in the years 1421 and 1538.
