= RHCG =

Protein-coding gene in the species Homo sapiens

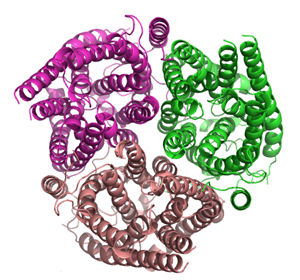

Identifiers
- Aliases: RHCG, C15orf6, PDRC2, RHGK, SLC42A3, Rh family C glycoprotein
- External IDs: OMIM: 605381; MGI: 1888517; GeneCards: RHCG
Available structures
PDB	Ortholog search: PDBe RCSB
PDB	List of PDB id codes 3HD6

Gene location (Human)
Chr.	Chromosome 15 (human)
Band	15q26.1	Start	89,471,398 bp
Band	15q26.1	End	89,496,589 bp

Gene location (Mouse)
Chr.	Chromosome 7 (mouse)
Band	7 D2|7 45.09 cM	Start	79,243,111 bp
Band	7 D2|7 45.09 cM	End	79,267,405 bp
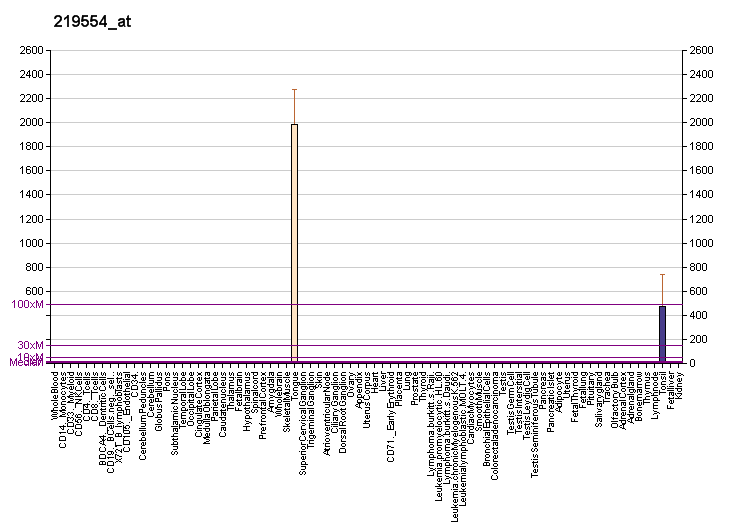
RNA expression pattern
Bgee	Human / Mouse (ortholog); Top expressed in: mucosa of pharynx; buccal mucosa cell; oral cavity; body of tongue; cervix epithelium; testicle; gums; gingival epithelium; human penis; periodontal fiber / Top expressed in: right kidney; human kidney; spermatocyte; spermatid; seminiferous tubule; renal pelvis; medullary collecting duct; embryo; renal calyx; ventricular zone; More reference expression data
BioGPS	More reference expression data
Gene ontology
Molecular function	ankyrin binding; ammonium transmembrane transporter activity; identical protein binding
Cellular component	integral component of membrane; membrane; plasma membrane; integral component of plasma membrane; basolateral plasma membrane; apical plasma membrane; extracellular exosome; cytoplasmic vesicle
Biological process	ammonium transmembrane transport; epithelial cell differentiation; amine transport; organic cation transport; transepithelial ammonium transport; cellular ion homeostasis; regulation of pH; homeostatic process; transport
Sources:Amigo / QuickGO
Orthologs
Databases	NCBI: entry; OMA: entry
Species	Human	Mouse
Entrez	51458	56315
Ensembl	ENSG00000140519	ENSMUSG00000030549
UniProt	Q9UBD6	Q9QXP0
RefSeq (mRNA)	NM_016321; NM_001321041	NM_019799
RefSeq (protein)	NP_001307970; NP_057405	NP_062773
Location (UCSC)	Chr 15: 89.47 – 89.5 Mb	Chr 7: 79.24 – 79.27 Mb
PubMed search
- Wikidata
View/Edit Human	View/Edit Mouse

Rh family, C glycoprotein, also known as RHCG, is a protein that in humans is encoded by the RHCG gene.

== Function ==
RHCG plays a critical role in ammonium handling and pH homeostasis in the kidney. The structure of the RHCG protein indicates that it has a hydrophobic ammonia-conducting channel and shows that it shares a common fold with the ammonia transporters, thus making it an ammonia transporter.
