= Rh blood group system =

Human blood group system involving 49 blood antigens

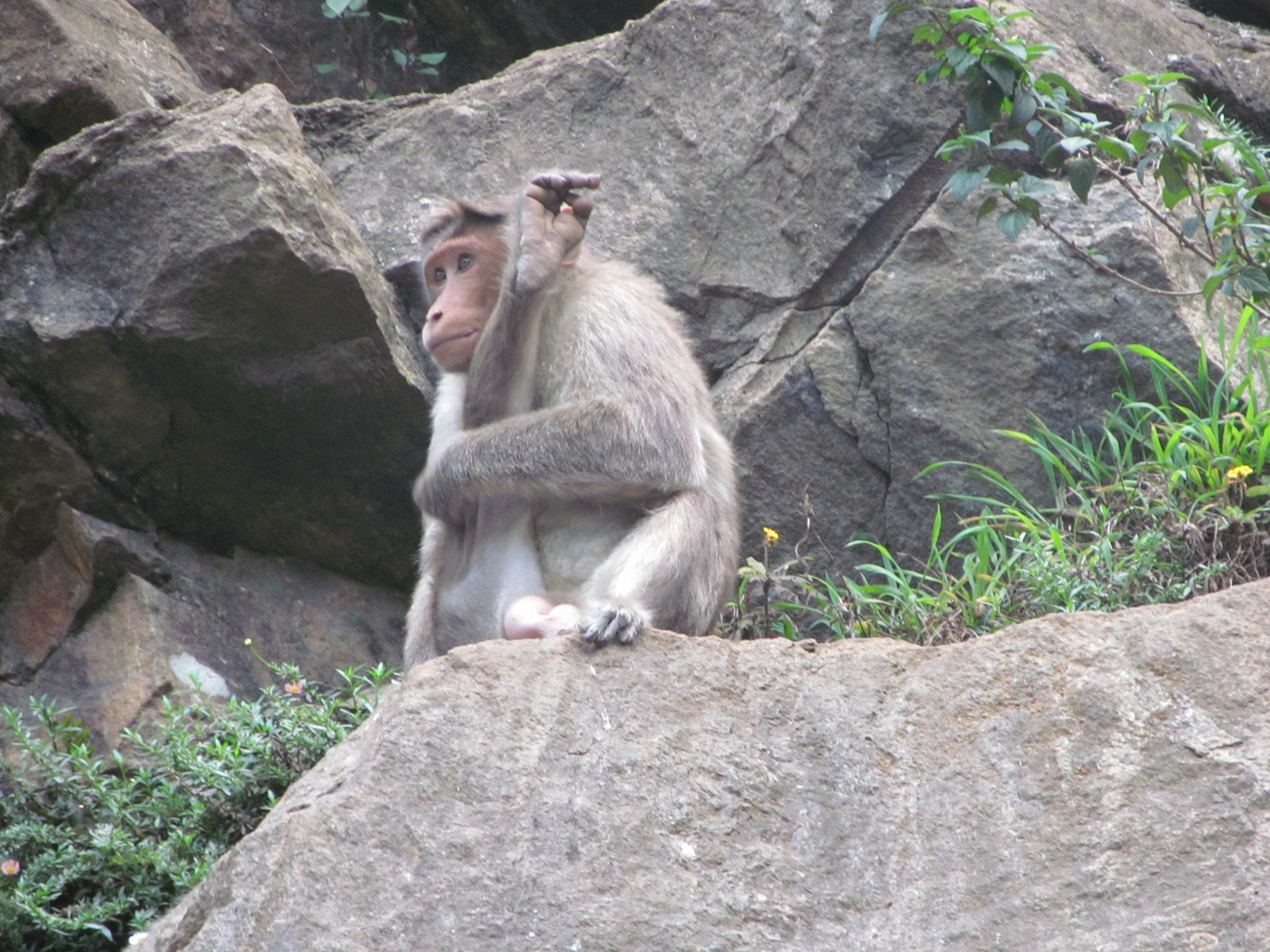
The name rhesus factor (Rh) goes back to the use of erythrocytes extracted from the blood of rhesus monkeys for obtaining the first blood serum.

The Rh blood group system is a human blood group system. It contains proteins on the surface of red blood cells. After the ABO blood group system, it is the second most important to be involved in transfusion reactions. The Rh blood group system consists of over 50 defined blood group antigens, of which five antigens: 'D', 'C', 'c', 'E', and 'e' are among the most prominent (only 'D' antigen exist but no 'd' antigen). Rh(D) status of an individual is normally described with a positive (+) or negative (−) suffix after the ABO type (e.g., someone who is A+ has the A antigen and Rh(D) antigen, whereas someone who is A− has the A antigen but lacks the Rh(D) antigen). The terms Rh factor, Rh positive, and Rh negative refer to the Rh(D) antigen only. Antibodies to Rh antigens can be involved in hemolytic transfusion reactions and antibodies to the Rh(D) and Rh antigens confer significant risk of hemolytic disease of the newborn.

== Nomenclature ==
Rh haplotype notation
Fisher–Race	Wiener
Dce	R_{0}
DCe	R_{1}
DcE	R_{2}
DCE	R_{Z}
dce	r
dCe	r'
dcE	r″
dCE	r^{y}

The Rh blood group system has two sets of nomenclature: one developed by Ronald Fisher and R. R. Race, the other by Wiener. The two systems reflect different theories of inheritance. The Fisher–Race system uses the CDE nomenclature. This system is based on the theory that a separate gene controls the product of each corresponding antigen (e.g., a "D gene" produces D antigen, and so on). However, the d gene was hypothetical, not actual.

The Wiener system uses the Rh–Hr nomenclature. This system is based on the theory that there is one gene at a single locus on each of the two copies of chromosome 1, each contributing to production of multiple antigens. In this theory, a gene R_{1} is supposed to give rise to the "blood factors" Rh_{0}, rh′, and rh″ (corresponding to modern nomenclature of the D, C, and E antigens) and the gene r to produce hr′ and hr″ (corresponding to modern nomenclature of the c and e antigens).

Notations of the two theories are used interchangeably in blood banking (e.g., Rho(D) meaning RhD positive). Some consider that Wiener's notation is more complex and cumbersome for routine use.

DNA testing has shown that both are partially correct: There are in fact two linked genes, the RHD gene which produces a single immune specificity (anti-D) and the RHCE gene with multiple specificities (anti-C, anti-c, anti-E, anti-e). Thus, Wiener's postulate that a gene could have multiple specificities (something many did not give credence to originally) has been proved to be correct. On the other hand, Wiener's theory that there is only one gene has proved to be incorrect, as has the Fisher–Race theory that there are three genes, rather than the two. The CDE notation used in the Fisher–Race nomenclature is sometimes rearranged to DCE to more accurately represent the co-location of the C and E encoding on the RhCE gene, and to make interpretation easier.

== Antigens ==
The proteins which carry the Rh antigens are transmembrane proteins, whose structure suggests that they are ion channels. The main antigens are D, C, E, c and e, which are encoded by two adjacent gene loci, the RHD gene which encodes the RhD protein with the D antigen (and variants) and the RHCE gene which encodes the RhCE protein with the C, E, c and e antigens (and variants). There is no d antigen. Lowercase "d" indicates the absence of the D antigen (the gene is usually deleted or otherwise nonfunctional).

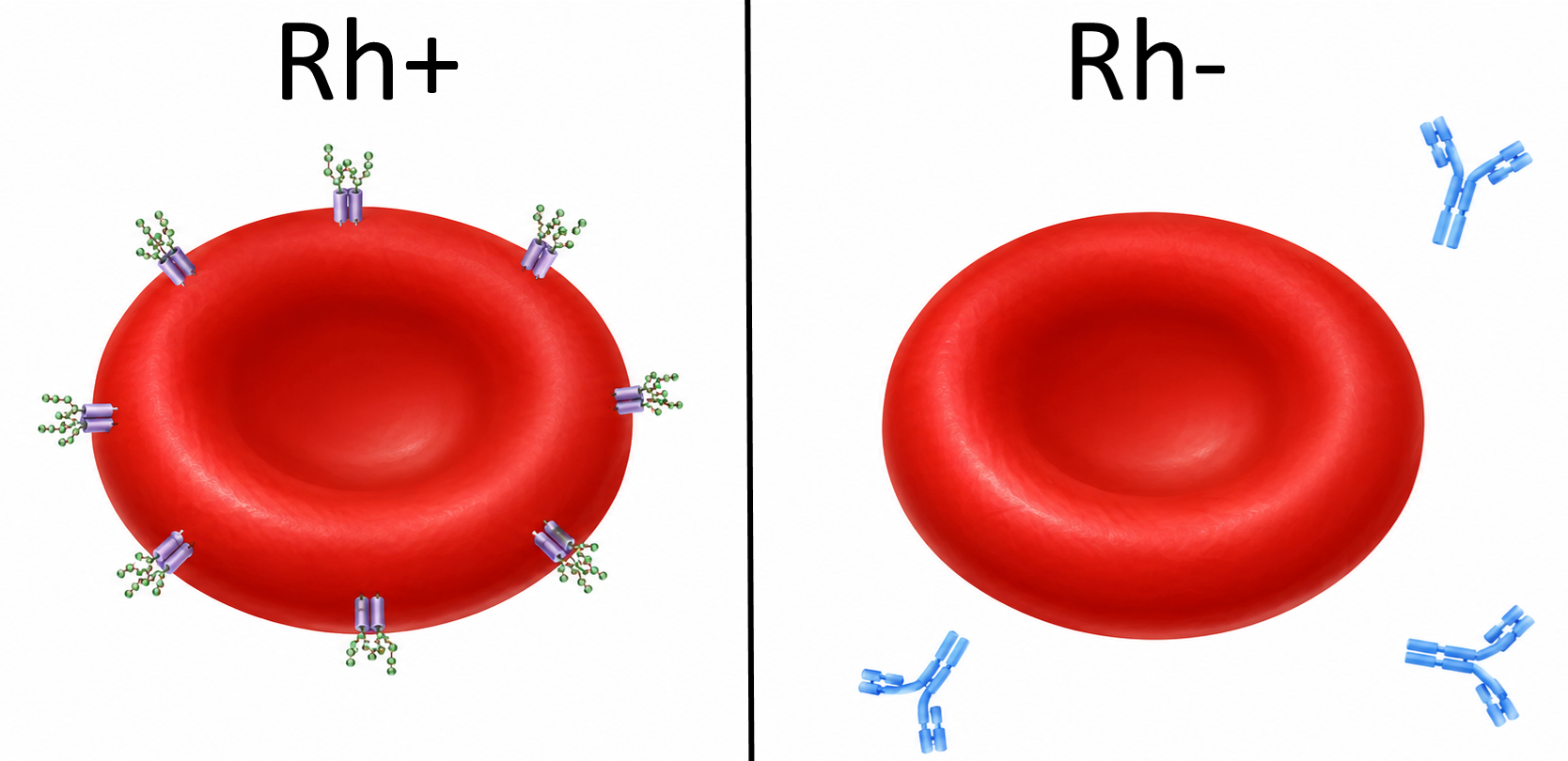
Rh-positive individuals have red blood cells with the Rh antigen (left) while Rh-negative individuals do not.

Rh phenotypes are readily identified through the presence or absence of the Rh surface antigens. As can be seen in the table below, most of the Rh phenotypes can be produced by several different Rh genotypes. The exact genotype of any individual can only be identified by DNA analysis. Regarding patient treatment, only the phenotype is usually of any clinical significance to ensure a patient is not exposed to an antigen they are likely to develop antibodies against. A probable genotype may be speculated on, based upon the statistical distributions of genotypes in the patient's place of origin.

R_{0} (cDe or Dce) is today most common in Africa. The allele was thus often assumed in early blood group analyses to have been typical of populations on the continent, particularly in areas below the Sahara. Ottensooser et al. (1963) suggested that high R_{0} frequencies were likely characteristic of the ancient Judean Jews, who had emigrated from Egypt prior to their dispersal throughout the Mediterranean Basin and Europe on the basis of high R_{0} percentages among Sephardi and Ashkenazi Jews compared to native European populations and the relative genetic isolation of Ashkenazim. However, more recent studies have found R_{0} frequencies as low as 24.3% among some Afroasiatic-speaking groups in the Horn of Africa, as well as higher R_{0} frequencies among certain other Afroasiatic speakers in North Africa (37.3%) and among some Palestinians in the Levant (30.4%). On the contrary, at a frequency of 47.2% of the population of Basque country having the lack of the D antigen, these people display the highest frequency of the Rh negative phenotype.

Rh phenotypes and genotypes (UK, 1948)
Phenotype expressed on cell	Genotype expressed in DNA		Prevalence (%)
Phenotype expressed on cell	Fisher–Race notation	Wiener notation	Prevalence (%)
D+ C+ E+ c+ e+ (RhD+)	Dce/DCE	R_{0}R_{Z}	0.0125
D+ C+ E+ c+ e+ (RhD+)	Dce/dCE	R_{0}r_{Y}	0.0003
D+ C+ E+ c+ e+ (RhD+)	DCe/DcE	R_{1}R_{2}	11.8648
D+ C+ E+ c+ e+ (RhD+)	DCe/dcE	R_{1}r″	0.9992
D+ C+ E+ c+ e+ (RhD+)	DcE/dCe	R_{2}r′	0.2775
D+ C+ E+ c+ e+ (RhD+)	DCE/dce	R_{Z}r	0.1893
D+ C+ E+ c+ e− (RhD+)	DcE/DCE	R_{2}R_{Z}	0.0687
D+ C+ E+ c+ e− (RhD+)	DcE/dCE	R_{2}r_{Y}	0.0014
D+ C+ E+ c+ e− (RhD+)	DCE/dcE	R_{Z}r″	0.0058
D+ C+ E+ c− e+ (RhD+)	DCe/dCE	R_{1}r_{Y}	0.0042
D+ C+ E+ c− e+ (RhD+)	DCE/dCe	R_{Z}r′	0.0048
D+ C+ E+ c− e+ (RhD+)	DCe/DCE	R_{1}R_{Z}	0.2048
D+ C+ E+ c− e− (RhD+)	DCE/DCE	R_{Z}R_{Z}	0.0006
D+ C+ E+ c− e− (RhD+)	DCE/dCE	R_{Z}r_{Y}	< 0.0001
D+ C+ E− c+ e+ (RhD+)	Dce/dCe	R_{0}r′	0.0505
D+ C+ E− c+ e+ (RhD+)	DCe/dce	R_{1}r	32.6808
D+ C+ E− c+ e+ (RhD+)	DCe/Dce	R_{1}R_{0}	2.1586
D+ C+ E− c− e+ (RhD+)	DCe/DCe	R_{1}R_{1}	17.6803
D+ C+ E− c− e+ (RhD+)	DCe/dCe	R_{1}r′	0.8270
D+ C− E+ c+ e+ (RhD+)	DcE/Dce	R_{2}R_{0}	0.7243
D+ C− E+ c+ e+ (RhD+)	Dce/dcE	R_{0}r″	0.0610
D+ C− E+ c+ e+ (RhD+)	DcE/dce	R_{2}r	10.9657
D+ C− E+ c+ e− (RhD+)	DcE/DcE	R_{2}R_{2}	1.9906
D+ C− E+ c+ e− (RhD+)	DcE/dcE	R_{2}r″	0.3353
D+ C− E− c+ e+ (RhD+)	Dce/Dce	R_{0}R_{0}	0.0659
D+ C− E− c+ e+ (RhD+)	Dce/dce	R_{0}r	1.9950
D− C+ E+ c+ e+ (RhD−)	dce/dCE	rr_{Y}	0.0039
D− C+ E+ c+ e+ (RhD−)	dCe/dcE	r′r″	0.0234
D− C+ E+ c+ e− (RhD−)	dcE/dCE	r″r_{Y}	0.0001
D− C+ E+ c− e+ (RhD−)	dCe/dCE	r′r_{Y}	0.0001
D− C+ E+ c− e− (RhD−)	dCE/dCE	r_{Y}r_{Y}	< 0.0001
D− C+ E− c+ e+ (RhD−)	dce/dCe	rr′	0.7644
D− C+ E− c− e+ (RhD−)	dCe/dCe	r′r′	0.0097
D− C− E+ c+ e+ (RhD−)	dce/dcE	rr″	0.9235
D− C− E+ c+ e− (RhD−)	dcE/dcE	r″r″	0.0141
D− C− E− c+ e+ (RhD−)	dce/dce	rr	15.1020

• Figures taken from a study performed in 1948 on a sample of 2000 people in the United Kingdom.

Rh phenotypes in patients and donors in Turkey
Rh Phenotype	CDE	Patients (%)	Donors (%)
R_{1}r	CcDe	37.4	33.0
R_{1}R_{2}	CcDEe	35.7	30.5
R_{1}R_{1}	CDe	5.7	21.8
rr	ce	10.3	11.6
R_{2}r	cDEe	6.6	10.4
R_{0}R_{0}	cDe	2.8	2.7
R_{2}R_{2}	cDE	2.8	2.4
rr″	cEe	–	0.98
R_{Z}R_{Z}	CDE	–	0.03
rr′	Cce	0.8	–

=== Rh antibodies ===
Rh antibodies are Immunoglobulin G (IgG) antibodies which are acquired through exposure to Rh-positive blood (generally either through pregnancy or transfusion of blood products). The D antigen is the most immunogenic of all the non-ABO antigens. Approximately 80% of individuals who are D-negative and exposed to a single D-positive unit will produce an anti-D antibody. The percentage of alloimmunization is significantly reduced in patients who are actively exsanguinating.

All Rh antibodies except D display dosage (antibody reacts more strongly with red cells homozygous for an antigen than cells heterozygous for the antigen (EE stronger reaction vs Ee)).

If anti-E is detected, the presence of anti-c should be strongly suspected (due to combined genetic inheritance). It is therefore common to select c-negative and E-negative blood for transfusion patients who have an anti-E and lack the c antigen (in general, a patient will not produce antibodies against their own antigens). Anti-c is a common cause of delayed hemolytic transfusion reactions.

== Hemolytic disease of the newborn ==
The hemolytic condition occurs when there is an incompatibility between the blood types of the mother and fetus. There is also potential incompatibility if the mother is Rh negative, and the father is positive. When the mother conceives for the first time, with a positive child, she will become extremely sensitive. When any incompatibility is detected when she conceives the second time in less than two years then, the mother often receives an injection at 28 weeks' gestation and at birth to avoid the development of antibodies towards the fetus. If not given, then the fetus will be dead and must be aborted. These terms do not indicate which specific antigen-antibody incompatibility is implicated. The disorder in the fetus due to Rh D incompatibility is known as erythroblastosis fetalis.

- Hemolytic comes from two words: "hema" (blood) and "lysis" (solution) or breaking down of red blood cells
- Erythroblastosis refers to the making of immature red blood cells
- Fetalis refers to the fetus.

When the condition is caused by the Rh D antigen-antibody incompatibility, it is called Rh D Hemolytic disease of the newborn or Rh disease. Here, sensitization to Rh D antigens (usually by feto-maternal transfusion during pregnancy) may lead to the production of maternal IgG anti-D antibodies which can pass through the placenta. This is of particular importance to D negative females at or below childbearing age, because any subsequent pregnancy may be affected by the Rh D hemolytic disease of the newborn if the baby is D positive. The vast majority of Rh disease is preventable in modern antenatal care by injections of IgG anti-D antibodies (Rho(D) Immune Globulin). The incidence of Rh disease is mathematically related to the frequency of D negative individuals in a population, so Rh disease is rare in old-stock populations of Africa and the eastern half of Asia, and the Indigenous peoples of Oceania and the Americas, but more common in other genetic groups, most especially Western Europeans, but also other West Eurasians, and to a lesser degree, native Siberians, as well as those of mixed-race with a significant or dominant descent from those (e.g. the vast majority of Latin Americans and Central Asians).

- Symptoms and signs in the fetus:
  - Enlarged liver, spleen, or heart and fluid buildup in the fetus' abdomen seen via ultrasound.
- Symptoms and signs in the newborn:
  - Anemia that creates the newborn's pallor (pale appearance).
  - Jaundice or yellow discoloration of the newborn's skin, sclera or mucous membrane. This may be evident right after birth or after 24–48 hours after birth. This is caused by bilirubin (one of the end products of red blood cell destruction).
  - Enlargement of the newborn's liver and spleen.
  - The newborn may have severe edema of the entire body.
  - Dyspnea (difficulty breathing)

=== Other animals with Rh-like antigens causing hemolytic disease of the newborn ===
Rh disease only occurs in human fetuses, however a similar disease called Neonatal isoerythrolysis (NI) can be observed in animal species of newborn horses, mules, pigs, cats, cattle, and dogs. What differs between Rh disease and NI is the pathogenesis of hemolysis between human fetuses and the animal species. With human mothers, the maternal antibodies are formed from the sensitization of foreign antigens of her unborn fetus's red blood cells passing through the placenta causing hemolysis before birth. With other animals, however, these maternal antibodies are not passed through the placenta, but through colostrum. The newborn animal is without NI but soon develops hemolytic anemia after initial ingestion of its mother's colostrum that contain antibodies that can be absorbed through the newborn's intestines and are incompatible to its red blood cell antigen. After 48 hours of birth, the newborn may be allowed to nurse from its mother as her antibodies can no longer be absorbed through the neonate's intestines. Because the most active newborn animals consume the most colostrum, they may be the ones who are most affected by the blood incompatibility of antigen and antibody.

== Population data ==
According to a comprehensive study, the worldwide frequency of Rh-positive and Rh-negative blood types is approximately 94% and 6%, respectively. The same study concluded that the share of the population with Rh-negative blood type is set to fall further in the future primarily due to low population growth in Europe. The frequency of Rh factor blood types and the RhD neg allele gene differs in various populations.

Population data for the Rh D factor and RhD neg allele
Population	Rh(D) Neg	Rh(D) Pos	Rh(D) Neg alleles
African Americans	~ 7%	93%	~ 26%
Albania	10.86%	89%	weak D 1.4%
Basques	21%–36%	65%	~ 60%
Britain	17%	83%	
China	< 1%	> 99%	
Ethiopians	19.4%	80.6%	
Europeans (others)	16%	84%	40%
India	5.87%	94.13%	
Indonesia	< 1%	> 99%	
Japan	< 1%	> 99%	
Koreans	< 1%	> 99%	
Madagascar	1%	99%	
Moroccans	9.5%	90.5%	
Moroccans (High Atlas)	~ 29%	71%	
Native Americans	~ 1%	99%	~ 10%
Nigeria	6%	94%	
Saudi Arabia	8.8%	91.2%	29.5%
Subequatorial Africa	1%–3%	99%–97%	
United States	15%	85%	

== Genetics ==
This is a Punnett square for Rh factor inheritance. This square specifically shows two heterozygous Rh positive parents and the possible genotypes/phenotypes the offspring could have.

The D antigen is inherited as one gene (RHD) (on the short arm of the first chromosome, p36.13–p34.3) with various alleles. Typically, Rhesus positive people have an intact RHD gene while negative people lack the gene (or have mutations in it). However, there are exceptions: for instance, Japanese and black Africans may have an intact gene that is not expressed or only at very low levels. The gene codes for the RhD protein on the red blood cell membrane. D− individuals who lack a functional RHD gene do not produce the D antigen and may be immunized by D+ blood.

The D antigen is a dominant trait. If both of a child's parents are Rh negative, the child will definitely be Rh negative. Otherwise, the child may be Rh positive or Rh negative, depending on the parents' specific genotypes.

The epitopes for the next 4 most common Rh antigens, C, c, E and e are expressed on the highly similar RhCE protein that is genetically encoded in the RHCE gene, also found on chromosome 1. It has been shown that the RHD gene arose by duplication of the RHCE gene during primate evolution. Mice have just one RH gene.

The RHAG gene, which is responsible for encoding Rh-associated glycoprotein (RhAG), is found on chromosome 6a.

The polypeptides produced from the RHD and RHCE genes form a complex on the red blood cell membrane with the Rh-associated glycoprotein.

== Clinical diagnostic ==
Clinical testing in patient care for Rh antigens follows published minimum quality and operational requirements, similar to red cell genotyping for any of the other recognized blood group systems. Molecular analysis can identify gene variants (alleles) that may affect Rh antigens expression on the red cell membrane.

== Function ==
Blood group Rh C/E/D polypeptide

Identifiers
- Symbol: ?
- InterPro: IPR002229
- TCDB: 1.A.11
Available protein structures:
- PDB: IPR002229
- AlphaFold: IPR002229

On the basis of structural homology it has been proposed that the product of RHD gene, the RhD protein, is a membrane transport protein of uncertain specificity (CO_{2} or NH_{3}) and unknown physiological role. The three-dimensional structure of the related RHCG protein and biochemical analysis of the RhD protein complex indicates that the RhD protein is one of three subunits of an ammonia transporter. Three recent studies have reported a protective effect of the RhD-positive phenotype, especially RhD heterozygosity, against the negative effect of latent toxoplasmosis on psychomotor performance in infected subjects. RhD-negative compared to RhD-positive subjects without anamnestic titres of anti-Toxoplasma antibodies have shorter reaction times in tests of simple reaction times. And conversely, RhD-negative subjects with anamnestic titres (i.e. with latent toxoplasmosis) exhibited much longer reaction times than their RhD-positive counterparts. The published data suggested that only the protection of RhD-positive heterozygotes was long term in nature; the protection of RhD-positive homozygotes decreased with duration of the infection while the performance of RhD-negative homozygotes decreased immediately after the infection. The overall change in reaction times was always larger in the RhD-negative group than in the RhD-positive.

=== Non-human Rh proteins ===
Rh-like proteins can be found even in species other than vertebrates (which have red blood cells) – worms, bacteria, and algae. All these Rh proteins have the same biochemical function of transporting CO_{2}, differing slightly in their amino acid sequences. The Rh family as a whole is related to ammonia transporters (Amt). In C. elegans worms, disruption of the Rh1 gene causes growth defects under high CO_{2} levels. Chlamydomonas reinhardtii algae fail to grow rapidly if its Rh gene is knocked down. Although in vitro evidence shows the Rh complex is capable of moving ammonia, its disruption does not cause growth defects under modified ammonia levels.

== RHD polymorphism ==
=== Origin of RHD polymorphism ===
For a long time, the origin of RHD polymorphism was an evolutionary enigma. Before the advent of modern medicine, the carriers of the rarer allele (e.g. RhD-negative women in a population of RhD positives or RhD-positive men in a population of RhD negatives) were at a disadvantage as some of their children (RhD-positive children born to preimmunised RhD-negative mothers) were at a higher risk of fetal or newborn death or health impairment from hemolytic disease.

Natural selection aside, the RHD-RHCE region is structurally predisposed to many mutations seen in humans, since the pair arose by gene duplication and remain similar enough for unequal crossing over to occur. In addition to the case where D is deleted, crossover can also produce a single gene mixing exons from both RHD and RHCE, forming the majority of partial D types.

=== Weak D ===
Comparison
	Weak D	Partial D
Change in D	Decreased amount	Structural alternation
Can donate as if being:	D positive	D positive
Can receive blood as if being:	D positive (usually)	D negative

In serologic testing, D positive blood is easily identified. Units that are D negative are often retested to rule out a weaker reaction. This was previously referred to as D^{u}, which has been replaced. By definition, weak D phenotype is characterized by negative reaction with anti-D reagent at immediate spin (IS), negative reaction after 37 °C incubation, and positive reaction at anti-human globulin (AHG) phase. Weak D phenotype can occur in several ways. In some cases, this phenotype occurs because of an altered surface protein that is more common in people of European descent. An inheritable form also occurs, as a result of a weakened form of the R0 gene. Weak D may also occur as "C in trans", whereby a C gene is present on the opposite chromosome to a D gene (as in the combination R0r', or "Dce/dCe"). The testing is difficult, since using different anti-D reagents, especially the older polyclonal reagents, may give different results.

The practical implication of this is that people with this sub-phenotype will have a product labeled as "D positive" when donating blood. When receiving blood, they are sometimes typed as a "D negative", though this is the subject of some debate. Most "Weak D" patients can receive "D positive" blood without complications. However, it is important to correctly identify the ones that have to be considered D+ or D−. This is important, since most blood banks have a limited supply of "D negative" blood and the correct transfusion is clinically relevant. In this respect, genotyping of blood groups has much simplified this detection of the various variants in the Rh blood group system.

=== Partial D ===
It is important to differentiate weak D (due to a quantitative difference in the D antigen) from partial D (due to a qualitative difference in the D antigen). Simply put, the weak D phenotype is due to a reduced number of D antigens on a red blood cell. In contrast, the partial D phenotype is due to an alteration in D-epitopes. Thus, in partial D, the number of D antigens is not reduced but the protein structure is altered. These individuals, if alloimmunized to D, can produce an anti-D antibody. Therefore, partial D patients who are donating blood should be labeled as D-positive but, if receiving blood, they should be labeled as D-negative and receive D-negative units.

In the past, partial D was called 'D mosaic' or 'D variant.' Different partial D phenotypes are defined by different D epitopes on the outer surface of the red blood cell membrane. More than 30 different partial D phenotypes have been described.

== Rh_{null} phenotype ==
Rh_{null} individuals have no Rh antigens (no Rh or RhAG) on their red blood cells. This rare condition has been called "Golden Blood". As a consequence of Rh antigen absence, Rh_{null} red blood cells also lack LW and Fy5 and show weak expression of S, s, and U antigens.

Red blood cells lacking Rh/RhAG proteins have structural abnormalities (such as stomatocytosis) and cell membrane defects that can result in hemolytic anemia.

The first Rh_{null} blood was discovered in an Aboriginal Australian woman, in 1961. Only 43 individuals have been reported to have it worldwide. Only nine active donors have been reported. Its properties make it attractive in numerous medical applications, but scarcity makes it expensive to transport and acquire.

While this blood type has been identified in fewer than 50 people, it is not quite as rare as this figure is often interpreted to mean, though still exceedingly rare. It is estimated that 1 in 6 million people have this blood type.

== Other Rh group antigens ==
As of 2023, over 50 antigens have been described in the Rh group system; among those described here, the D, C, c, E and e antigens are the most important. The others are much less frequently encountered or are rarely clinically significant. Each is given a number, though the highest assigned number (CEVF or RH61 according to the ISBT terminology) is not an accurate reflection of the antigens encountered since many (e.g. Rh38) have been combined, reassigned to other groups, or otherwise removed.

Some of the other Rh "antigens" are f ("ce", RH6), Ce (RH7), C^{w} (RH8), C^{x} (RH9), V (RH10), E^{w} (RH11), G (RH12), Tar (RH40), VS (RH20), D^{w} (RH23), and CE (RH22). Some of these groups, including f, Ce and CE, describe grouping of some existing groups. Others, like V, describe an epitope created by some other mutation on the RHD and RHCE genes. V in particular is caused by a mutation on RHCE.

== History ==
The term "Rh" was originally an abbreviation of "Rhesus factor". It was discovered in 1939 by Karl Landsteiner and Alexander S. Wiener, who, at the time, believed it to be a similar antigen found in rhesus macaque red blood cells. It was subsequently discovered that the human factor is not identical to the rhesus monkey factor, but by then, "Rhesus Group" and like terms were already in widespread, worldwide use. Thus, notwithstanding it is a misnomer, the term survives (e.g., rhesus blood group system and the obsolete terms rhesus factor, rhesus positive, and rhesus negative – all three of which actually refer specifically and only to the Rh D factor and are thus misleading when unmodified). Contemporary practice is to use "Rh" as a term of art instead of "Rhesus" (e.g., "Rh Group", "Rh factors", "Rh D", etc.).

The significance of their discovery was not immediately apparent and was only realized in 1940, after subsequent findings by Philip Levine and Rufus Stetson. The serum that led to the discovery was produced by immunizing rabbits with red blood cells from a rhesus macaque. The antigen that induced this immunization was designated by them as Rh factor to indicate that rhesus blood had been used for the production of the serum.

In 1939, Phillip Levine and Rufus Stetson published in a first case report the clinical consequences of non-recognized Rh factor, hemolytic transfusion reaction, and hemolytic disease of the newborn in its most severe form. It was recognized that the serum of the reported woman agglutinated with red blood cells of about 80% of the people although the then known blood groups, in particular ABO were matched. No name was given to this agglutinin when described. In 1940, Landsteiner and Wiener made the connection to their earlier discovery, reporting a serum that also reacted with about 85% of different human red blood cells.

In 1941, Group O: a patient in Irvington, New Jersey, US, delivered a normal infant in 1931; this pregnancy was followed by a long period of sterility. The second pregnancy (April, 1941) resulted in an infant with icterus gravis. In May 1941, the third anti-Rh serum (M.S.) of Group O became available.

Based on the serologic similarities, 'Rh factor' was later also used for antigens, and anti-Rh for antibodies, found in humans such as those previously described by Levine and Stetson. Although differences between these two sera were shown already in 1942 and clearly demonstrated in 1963, the already widely used term "Rh" was kept for the clinically described human antibodies which are different from the ones related to the rhesus monkey. This real factor found in rhesus macaque was classified in the Landsteiner-Weiner antigen system (antigen LW, antibody anti-LW) in honor of the discoverers.

It was recognized that the Rh factor was just one in a system of various antigens. Based on different models of genetic inheritance, two different terminologies were developed; both of them are still in use.

The clinical significance of this highly immunizing D antigen (i.e., Rh factor) was soon realized. Some keystones were to recognize its importance for blood transfusion (including reliable diagnostic tests), hemolytic disease of the newborn (including exchange transfusion), and very importantly the prevention of it by screening and prophylaxis.

The discovery of cell-free fetal DNA in maternal circulation by Holzgrieve et al. led to the noninvasive genotyping of fetal Rh genes in many countries.
