= RHCE (gene) =

Protein-coding gene in humans

Identifiers
- Aliases: RHCE, CD240CE, RH, RH30A, RHC, RHE, RHIXB, RHPI, Rh4, RhIVb(J), RhVI, RhVIII, Rh blood group CcEe antigens, RHCe(152N), RHNA
- External IDs: OMIM: 111700; MGI: 1202882; GeneCards: RHCE

Gene location (Human)
Chr.	Chromosome 1 (human)
Band	1p36.11	Start	25,362,249 bp
Band	1p36.11	End	25,430,192 bp

Gene location (Mouse)
Chr.	Chromosome 4 (mouse)
Band	4 D3|4 67.13 cM	Start	134,591,847 bp
Band	4 D3|4 67.13 cM	End	134,623,483 bp
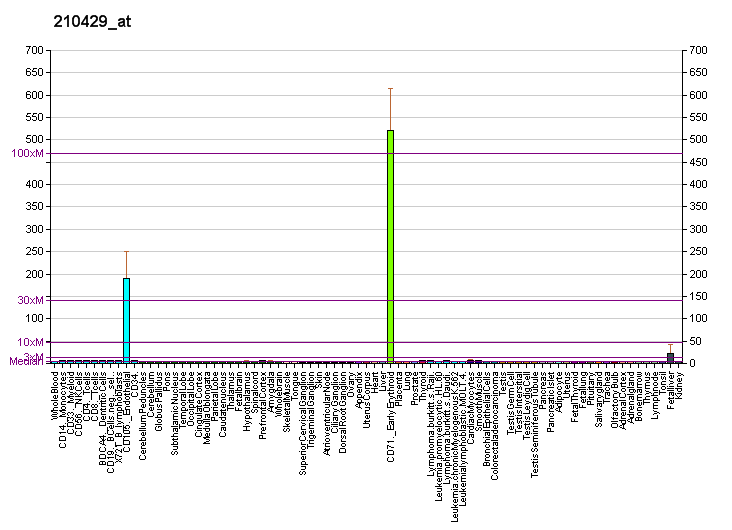

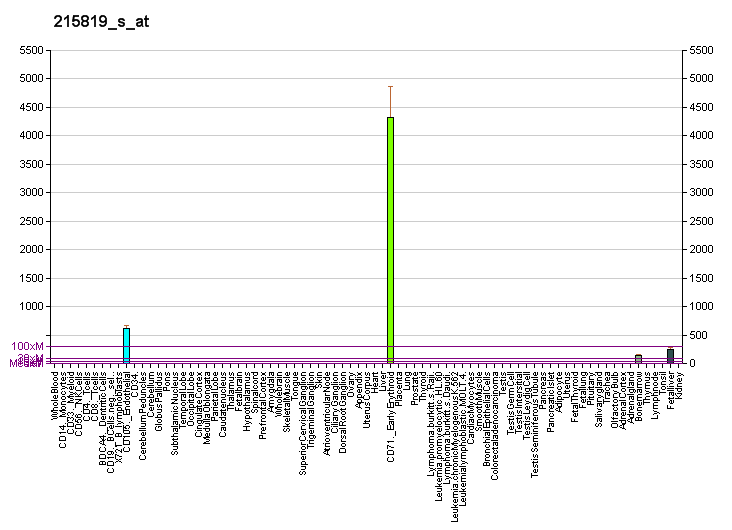

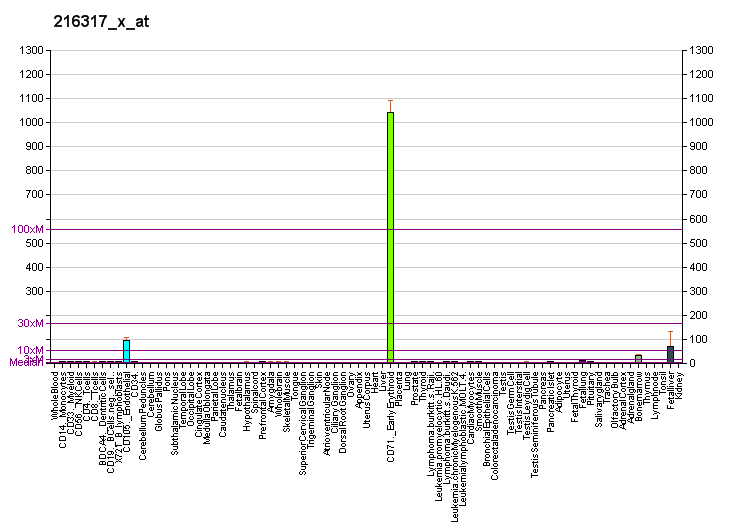
RNA expression pattern
Bgee	Human / Mouse (ortholog); Top expressed in: trabecular bone; bone marrow; testicle; gonad; bone marrow cell; endothelial cell; islet of Langerhans; blood; stromal cell of endometrium; gastric mucosa / Top expressed in: fetal liver hematopoietic progenitor cell; tibiofemoral joint; primary oocyte; human fetus; spleen; secondary oocyte; zygote; bone marrow; blood; femur; More reference expression data
BioGPS	More reference expression data
Gene ontology
Molecular function	ammonium transmembrane transporter activity
Cellular component	integral component of membrane; integral component of plasma membrane; membrane
Biological process	organic cation transport; ammonium transmembrane transport
Sources:Amigo / QuickGO
Orthologs
Databases	NCBI: entry; OMA: entry
Species	Human	Mouse
Entrez	6006	19746
Ensembl	ENSG00000188672	ENSMUSG00000028825
UniProt	P18577	Q8CF94
RefSeq (mRNA)	NM_020485; NM_138616; NM_138617; NM_138618; NM_001330430	NM_011270
RefSeq (protein)	NP_001317359; NP_065231; NP_619522; NP_619523; NP_619524	NP_035400
Location (UCSC)	Chr 1: 25.36 – 25.43 Mb	Chr 4: 134.59 – 134.62 Mb
PubMed search
- Wikidata
View/Edit Human	View/Edit Mouse

Blood group Rh(CE) polypeptide is a protein that in humans is encoded by the RHCE gene. RHCE has also recently been designated CD240CE (cluster of differentiation 240CE).

The Rh blood group system is the second most clinically significant of the blood groups, second only to ABO. It is also the most polymorphic of the blood groups, with variations due to deletions, gene conversions, and missense mutations. The Rh blood group includes this gene which encodes both the RhC and RhE antigens on a single polypeptide and a second gene which encodes the RhD protein. The classification of Rh-positive and Rh-negative individuals is determined by the presence or absence of the highly immunogenic RhD protein on the surface of erythrocytes. Alternative splicing of this gene results in four transcript variants encoding four different isoforms.

A recent study in the population of the island of Sardinia shows the association of a noncoding variant in the RHCE gene (rs630337) with an increased erythrocyte sedimentation rate(ESR). This suggest a possible causal effect of this polymorphism on this inflammatory marker despite not found in coding region of the gene.
