= List of Austrian inventors and discoverers =

This is a list of Austrian inventors and discoverers. The following list comprises people from Austria, and also people of predominantly Austrian heritage, in alphabetical order of the surname.

Existing:	A	B	C	D	E	F	G	H	I	J	K	L	M	N	O	P	Q	R	S	T	U	V	W	X	Y	Z
See also						Notes						References						External links

== B ==
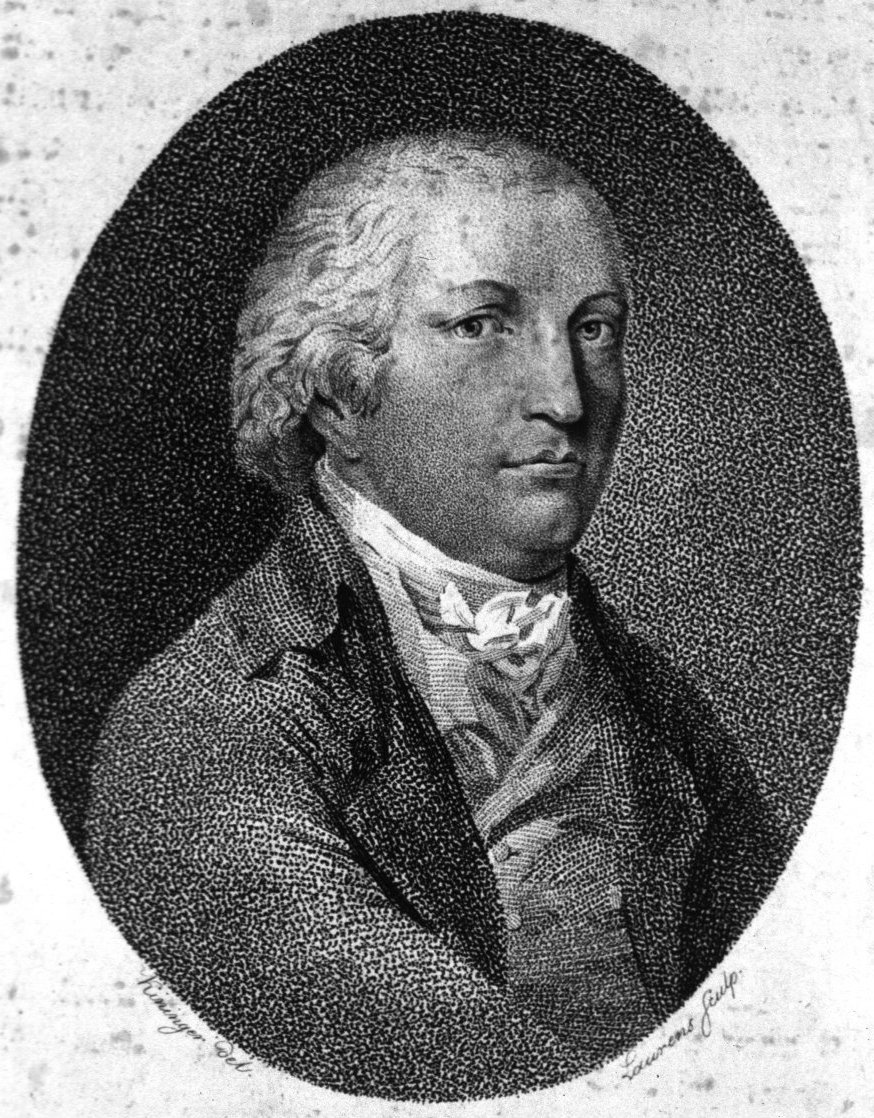
Georg Joseph Beer

- Georg Joseph Beer, introducing a flap operation for treatment of cataracts (Beer's operation), as well as popularizing the instrument used to perform the surgery (Beer's knife).
- Günther Burstyn, co-inventor of the tank (independent from him William Tritton and Walter Gordon Wilson)

== C ==
- Carl Cori (Nobel Prize), co-discovered Cori cycle.
- Gerty Cori (Nobel Prize), co-discovered Cori cycle.

== D ==
- Carl Djerassi, inventor of birth control pills
- Christian Doppler, discoverer of the Doppler effect

== E ==
- Paul Eisler, inventor of the printed circuit board.

== F ==
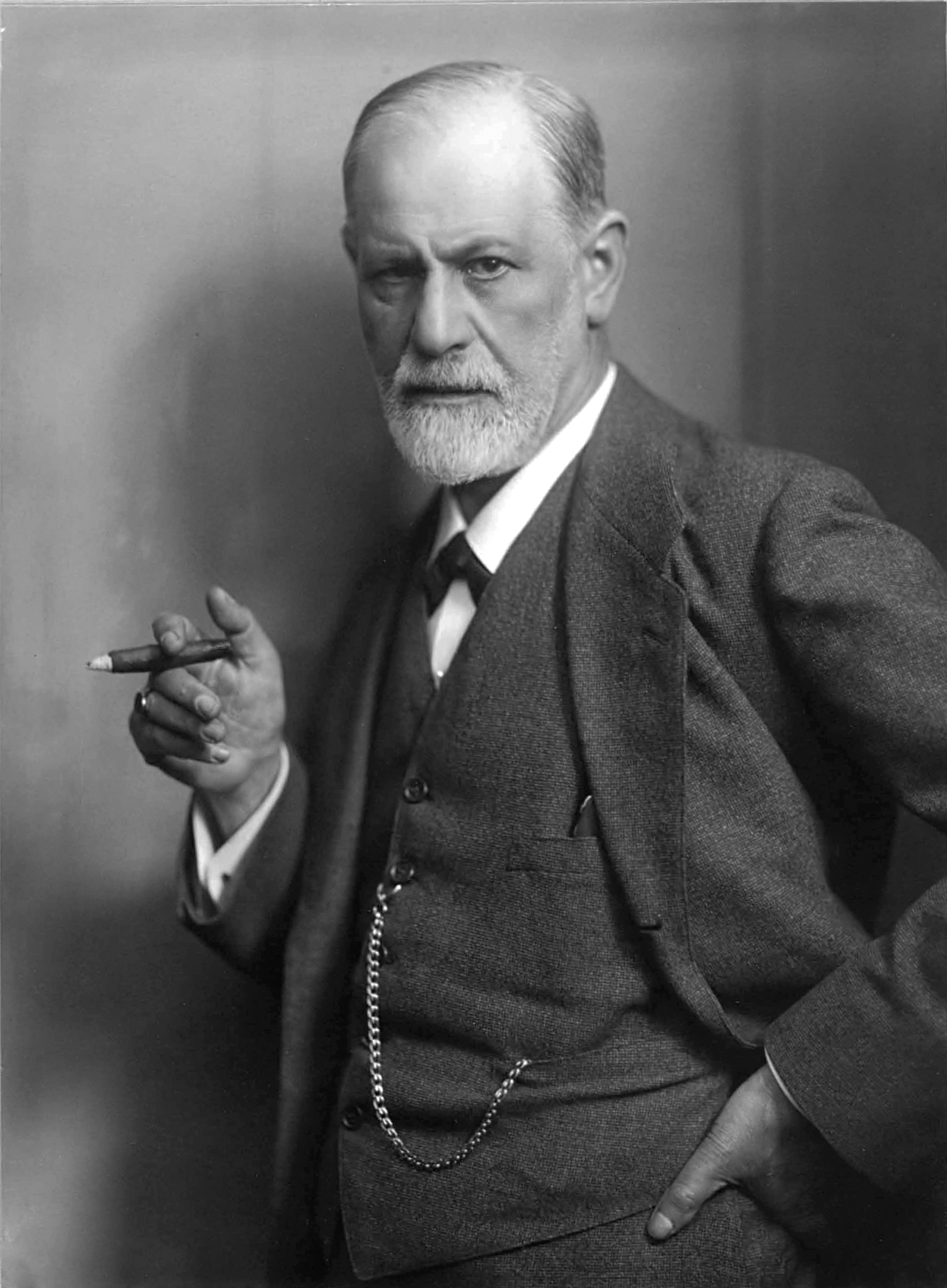
Sigmund Freud

- Otto Frenzl: aeronautical pioneer, developed the area rule in 1943, a design technique for airfoils used to reduce an aircraft's drag at transonic and supersonic speeds. Later it was independently developed again by Richard T. Whitcomb in 1952.
- Sigmund Freud: neurologist who became known as the founding father of psychoanalysis
- Karl von Frisch: (Nobel Prize), one of the founders of modern ethology, studies on waggle dance
- Paul Fürst: inventor of the Mozartkugel

== G ==
- David Gestetner, inventor of the Gestetner stencil duplicator.
- Adolph Giesl-Gieslingen, inventor of the Giesl ejector

== H ==
- Friedrich Hayek (Nobel Prize), pioneering work in the theory of money and economic fluctuations.

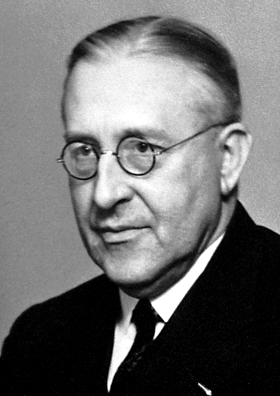
Victor Francis Hess

- Victor Francis Hess (Nobel Prize), discovered cosmic ray.
- Ingeborg Hochmair, developed the first modern cochlear implant

== K ==
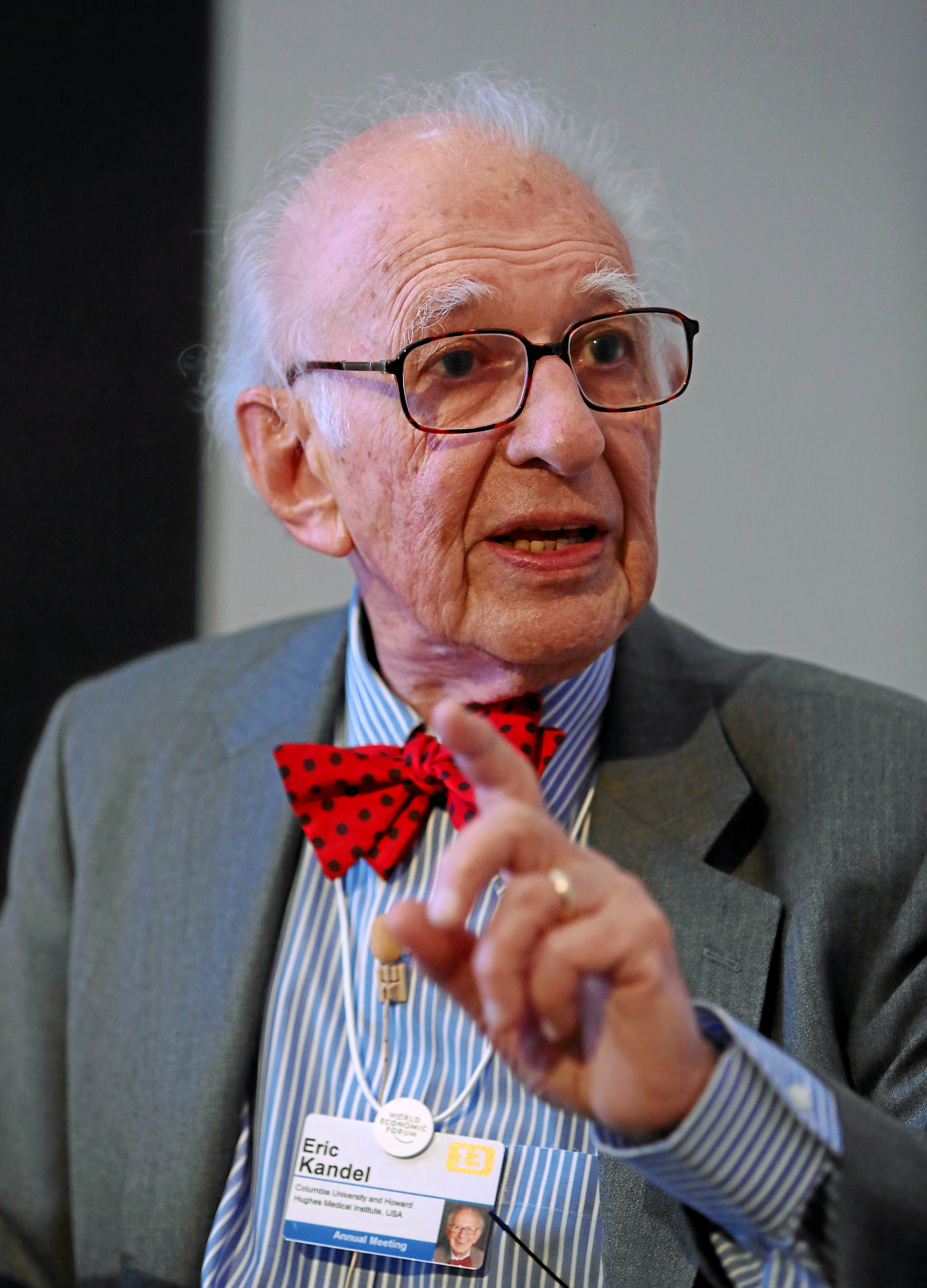
Eric Kandel

- Eric Kandel (Nobel Prize), research on the physiological basis of memory storage in neurons.
- Viktor Kaplan, inventor of the Kaplan turbine.
- Wolfgang von Kempelen, inventor of The Turk, a chess-playing automaton and Wolfgang von Kempelen's Speaking Machine.
- Walter Kohn (Nobel Prize) discovered Density functional theory
- Karl Kordesch, jointly co-inventor of Alkaline battery (together with Canadian Lewis Urry).
- Richard Kuhn (Nobel Prize), works on carotenoids and vitamins, co-discovered Soman

== L ==
- Hedy Lamarr, co-invented, with composer George Antheil, an early technique for spread spectrum communications and frequency hopping.

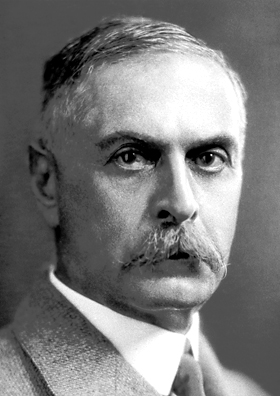
Karl Landsteiner

- Karl Landsteiner (Nobel Prize) discovered the main blood groups, co-discovered with Alexander S. Wiener, the Rhesus factor and co-discovered with Constantin Levaditi and Erwin Popper the polio virus.

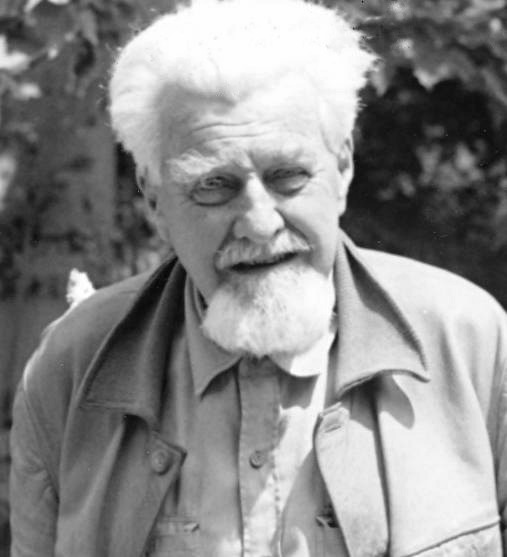
Konrad Lorenz

- Konrad Lorenz (Nobel Prize) one of the founders of modern ethology

== M ==
- Ferdinand Mannlicher, along with Scottish Canadian James Paris Lee, Mannlicher was particularly noted for inventing the en-bloc clip charger-loading magazine system.
- August Musger, inventor of slow motion.

== P ==
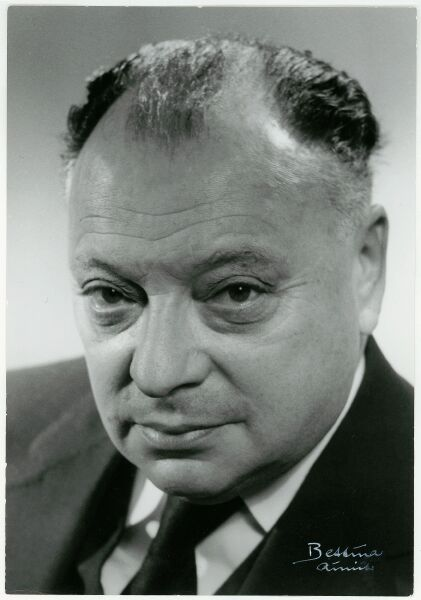
Wolfgang Pauli

- Wolfgang Pauli (Nobel Prize), discovered Pauli exclusion principle
- Max Perutz (Nobel Prize), co-discovered with John Kendrew in studies the structures of hemoglobin and globular proteins.
- Fritz Pregl (Nobel Prize), making important contributions to quantitative organic microanalysis, one of which was the improvement of the combustion train technique for elemental analysis.

== R ==
- Edmund Rumpler, inventor of Rumpler Tropfenwagen

== S ==
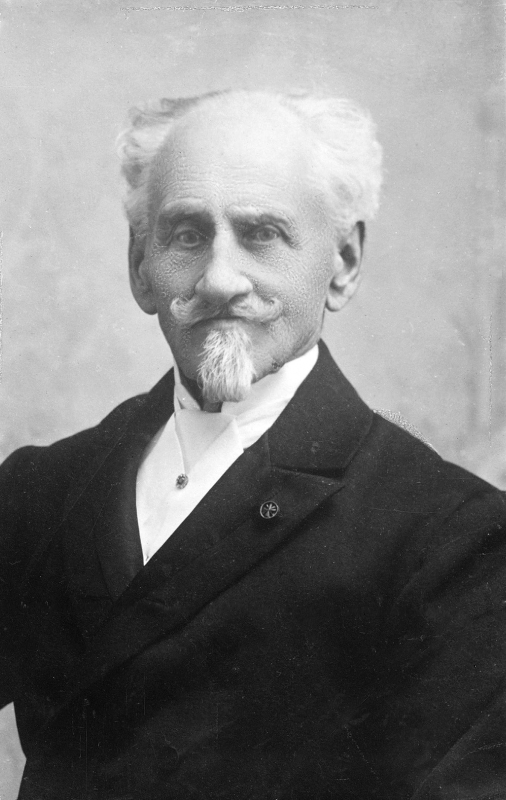
Franz Sacher

- Franz Sacher, inventor of Sachertorte
- Erwin Schrödinger, discovered Schrödinger equation
- Eduard Suess: discoveries in geology, continent Gondwana and Tethys Ocean was named by Suess
- Stephan von Breuning, discoverer of many varieties of beetles, particularly those in the Cerambycidae family

== T ==
- Gustav Tauschek, inventor of Drum memory

== V ==
- Max Valier, performed the first test drive of a rocket car with liquid propulsion, the Valier-Heylandt Rak 7.

== W ==
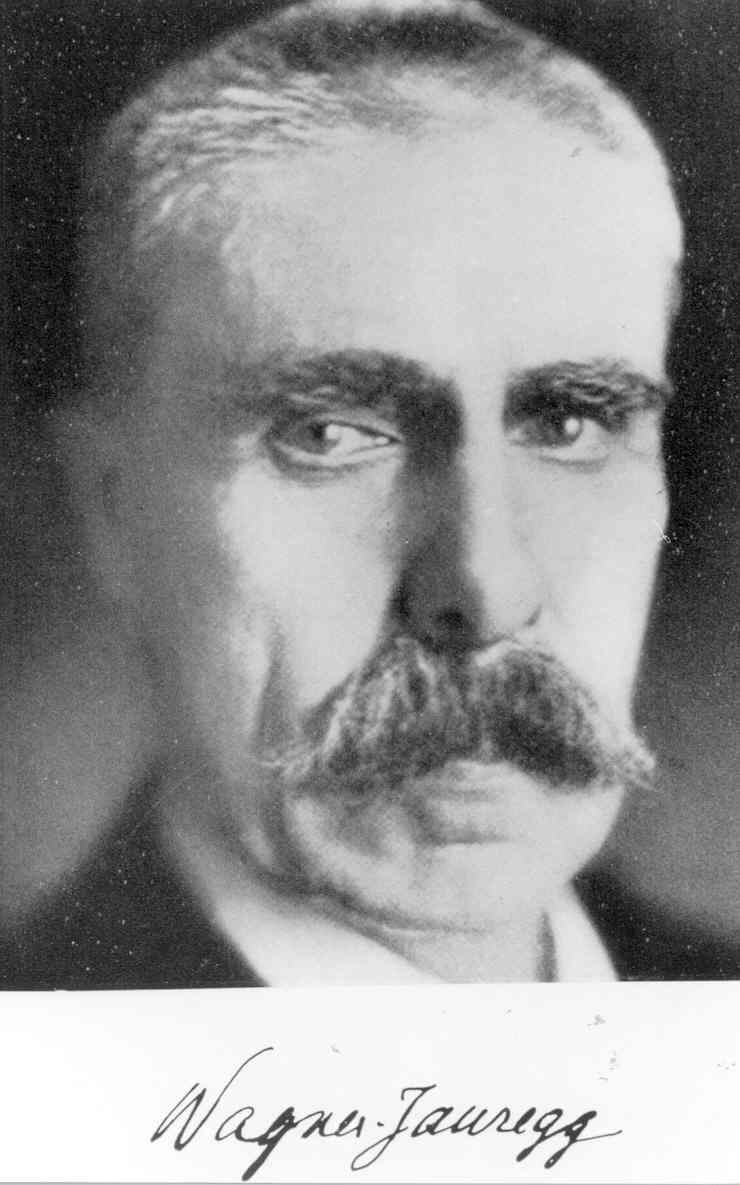
Julius Wagner-Jauregg

- Julius Wagner-Jauregg (Nobel Prize), discovered treatment of mental disease by inducing a fever, an approach known as pyrotherapy.

== See also ==
- List of Austrian Americans

== Notes ==
Austrians have a history of aircraft and math
