= List of Austrian inventions and discoveries =

Austrian inventions and discoveries are objects, processes or techniques invented or discovered partially or entirely by a person born in Austria. In some cases, their Austrianess is determined by the fact that they were born in Austria, of non-Austrian people working in the country. Often, things discovered for the first time are also called "inventions", and in many cases, there is no clear line between the two.

The following is a list of inventions or discoveries generally believed to be Austrian:

== Astronomy ==
- Cosmic ray, discovery by Victor Francis Hess (nobel prize)

== Chemistry ==
- Alkaline battery by Karl Kordesch jointly co-inventor (together with Canadian Lewis Urry)

Cori cycle

- Cori cycle by Carl Cori and Gerti Cori
- Soman by Richard Kuhn (nobel prize), works on carotenoids and vitamins

== Cuisine ==
- Kaiserschmarrn
- Mozartkugel by Paul Fürst

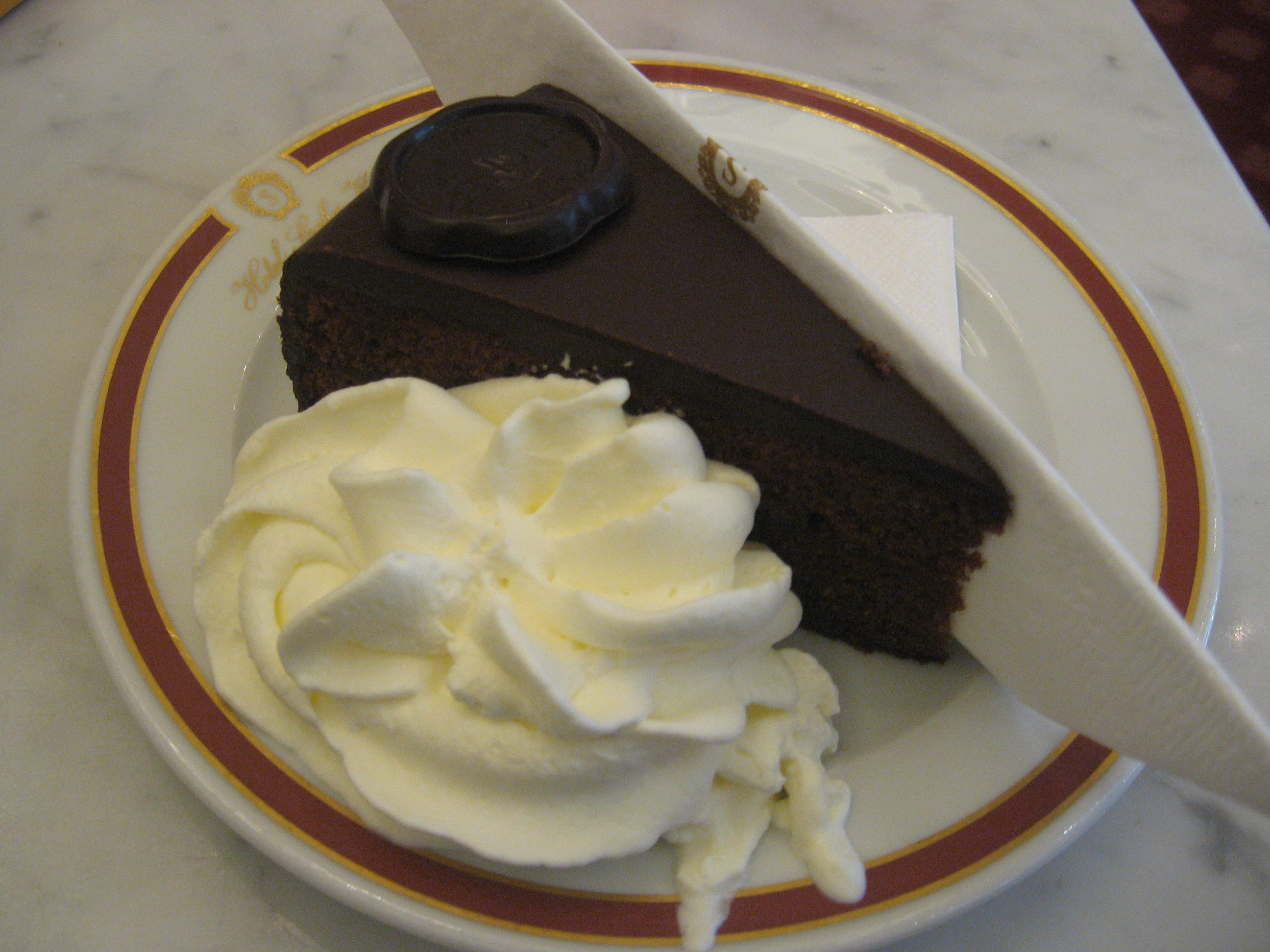
Sachertorte

- Sachertorte by Franz Sacher
- Salzburger Nockerl

== Geology ==
- Continent Gondwana by Eduard Suess
- Tethys Ocean by Eduard Suess

== Information technology ==
- Drum memory by Gustav Tauschek
- Printed circuit board by Paul Eisler

== Media, Film and Television ==
- Slow motion by August Musger

== Medicine ==
- Main blood groups by Karl Landsteiner (nobel prize) co-discovered with Alexander S. Wiener
- Psychoanalysis by Sigmund Freud
- Rhesus factor by Karl Landsteiner
- polio virus. co-discovered by Karl Landsteiner (with Constantin Levaditi and Erwin Popper)
- Hand disinfection/washing hands by Ignaz Semmelweis
- Aspergers Syndrome (Hans Asperger)

== Military ==
- Blow forward (Steyr Mannlicher M1894)
- Glock, A brand of polymer-frame semi-automatic pistols
- Salvator Dormus, first patented semi-automatic pistol
- AUG type automatic weapons: Aug A1, Aug Hbar, Aug A2, Aug A3, somewhat famous Austrian rifles, Low recoil + good accuracy.

== Physics ==
- Density functional theory by Walter Kohn (1998 nobel prize of Chemistry)
- Schrödinger equation by Erwin Schrödinger
- Pauli exclusion principle by Wolfgang Pauli

== Toys ==
- Altekruse Puzzle by Wilhelm Altekruse
- Snow globe by Erwin Perzy

== Transportation ==
- Giesl ejector by Adolph Giesl-Gieslingen
- Internal combustion engine by Siegfried Marcus
- Kaplan turbine by Viktor Kaplan
- Rumpler Tropfenwagen by Edmund Rumpler
- Valier-Heylandt Rak 7 by Max Valier

== Miscellaneous ==
- The Turk, a chess-playing automaton and Wolfgang von Kempelen's Speaking Machine by Wolfgang von Kempelen

== See also ==
- English inventions and discoveries
- Science in Medieval Western Europe
- German inventions and discoveries
- American inventions and discoveries
