= Electrosport =

AMC cars converted to battery power

Overview
- Manufacturer: Electric Fuel Propulsion Company
- Production: 1971 – 1974
- Assembly: Detroit, Michigan, United States

Body and chassis
- Class: Compact
- Body style: 4-door sedan 4-door station wagon

Powertrain
- Engine: DC series traction
- Transmission: 3-speed manual

Dimensions
- Wheelbase: 108 in (2,743 mm)
- Length: 181 in (4,597 mm)
- Width: 70.6 in (1,793 mm)
- Curb weight: 5,500 lb (2,500 kg)

The Electrosport (also described as "Electric-sport") was a compact-sized electric vehicle based on the AMC Hornet that were converted by the Electric Fuel Propulsion Company (EFP) of Ferndale, Michigan.

== Design ==
The zero-emission Electrosport concept cars were made using American Motors Corporation (AMC) Hornet sedans and “Sportabout” station wagons from 1971 until 1974.

The Electrosport was designed to be a supplementary vehicle for commuting or daily chores and to be recharged at home using household electric current as well as at Charge Stations when away from home to replenish power in 45 minutes.

The company also established the “World's First Electric Car Expressway” between Detroit and Chicago - a distance of about 300 miles (483 km) - that consisted of Interstate 94, but with six 50 kW charging stations that were located at Holiday Inn hotels near the highway. Additional charging stations were planned.

An EFP designed 20 hp (15 kW; 20 PS) direct current series-wound traction motor (the size of a one-gallon paint can) was bolted through an aluminum adapter plate to the car's standard clutch and 3-speed manual transmission. The motor was similar to that offered to teams in the Great Electric Race and capable of speeds up to 90 miles per hour (145 km/h). A total of 24 six-volt “TriPolar” cobalt-lead storage batteries were mounted under the hood and under a plywood floor in the trunk. These improved lead-cobalt batteries recharge fast and can go as many as 250 miles (400 km) between charges.

The company, and its president, Robert R. Aronson, were awarded several patents including the "Fifth Generation Lead Cobalt Battery". One 12-volt battery was provided for the car's lights and accessories. The solid-state, stopless controller was a modified unit from a forklift truck. An auxiliary gasoline heater with a one-gallon tank provided heat and defrosting. The system was called "Thunderbolt" by EFP and was billed as potentially installable in many different standard production Detroit automobiles.

The exterior of the Electrosport was differentiated from regular production Hornets by a one-piece solid fiberglass body-colored panel in place of the AMC's silver and black plastic grille. Additional gauges were added to the instrument panel. The Hornet's gas cap covered the three-prong plug mounted in the former fuel tank filler hole to which an extension cord connected to 220-volt AC power.

While reviewing a prototype, Motor Trend magazine indicated that cruising in second gear keeps the motor close to its 7000 revolutions per minute maximum will draw the least amount of electric current from the batteries, thus achieving a further range between recharges. The non-assisted brakes required a lot of pressure on the pedal because of the heavy weight of the car with its batteries – a total of 5,500 pounds (2,495 kg) in a chassis designed for 3,000 lb (1,400 kg) created problems. Acceleration from 0 to 60 mph was described as rather slow at 30 seconds, but flooring the accelerator in third gear produced the same sensation as in a large-sized car with a V8 engine and automatic transmission, clocking 12.5 seconds to go from 50 to 70 miles per hour (80 to 113 km/h).

An Electrosport was used by the Golden Valley Electric Association of Fairbanks, Alaska, as a test to help deal with the increasing ice fog in the city. This thick, choking fog is caused when water vapor from automobile exhaust and other sources meets an air mass that is too cold to disperse it, as well as cold enough to crystallize it. The 5-passenger vehicle was capable of reaching 60 miles per hour (97 km/h) in below freezing weather, and after 50 to 100 miles (80 to 161 km) of driving, its onboard fast-charger could replenish the batteries in less than 60 minutes.

The Electrosport was also tested and analyzed in a report about the impact of future use of electric cars in the Los Angeles region in 1974, as well as in a technical report on the performance of the Electrosport electric vehicle in 1975 by the United States Department of Energy.

The Electrosport was marketed as "a unique addition to the premium car market" and this was reflected in the station wagon's delivered price of UD$11,900 (state and local taxes not included). The company's target sales for the all-electric car were the New York City, Los Angeles, and Palm Beach, Florida markets. The plan was for EFP to be the first (modern) mass producer of electric autos with an expected order of 400 station wagons for the Electric Vehicle Council of the Edison Electric Institute.

In 1971, the average price for 1 US gallon (3.8 L; 0.8 imp gal) of gasoline was 36 cents (in the United States). For comparison, the original list price (manufacturers suggested retail price) of a standard gasoline-powered 1972 Hornet Sportabout station wagon was $2,587. Popular Science magazine noted that "you'll have to be a true idealist to place an order..."

== Legacy ==
Apollo Energy Systems later made other electric car models, including the 1972 X-144 Electric Car (based on an AMC Gremlin, the 1974 Santa Fe Luxury Sedan (based on an AMC Matador, and the 1978-2000 Silver Volt I. The technology developed by EFP has since been taken over by Apollo Energy Systems (AES).
