= Reuben Ottenberg =

American physician and haematologist (1882–1959)

Reuben Ottenberg (January 9, 1882 – April 25, 1959) was an American physician and haematologist associated with New York City's Mount Sinai Hospital for many decades. He helped establish the concept of the universal blood donor, and implemented the practice of compatibility testing before blood transfusions.

Ottenberg received his B.A. from Columbia University in 1902, and his M.D. from Columbia's College of Physicians and Surgeons three years later. He interned at Lenox Hill Hospital (known then as German Hospital) where he was influenced by the work of Karl Landsteiner on transfusions. Ottenberg was said to have performed New York's first matched-blood transfusion while at Lenox Hill.

In haemocompatibility tests, which Ottenberg initiated in 1907, he discovered that patient antibodies against donor red cells could be harmful, but not vice versa. He observed the Mendelian inheritance of blood groups and recognized the universal attributes of group O ("zero") donors. This research led to the use of individuals with blood type O as universal donors.

He published a seminal 1911 paper in the Journal of Experimental Medicine that described his findings on blood group interactions (referred to by Landsteiner as "isoagglutination"), and stressed the importance of preliminary blood compatibility testing to ensure successful transfusions. Ottenberg reiterated the latter point in a 1913 JAMA article, "Accidents in Transfusion: Their Prevention by Preliminary Blood Examination", co-written with David Kaliski.

In 1921, Ottenberg married Marie Clarisse Chene. Their son Simon was born in 1923.

In 1954, Ottenberg was the first recipient of the Karl Landsteiner Memorial Award from the American Society of Blood Banks. He was cited for his "distinguished pioneering contributions to blood banking and hemotherapy."

On April 25, 1959, Reuben Ottenberg died in Mount Sinai Hospital after a long illness. He was 77.
