= Philip Levine (physician) =

- Born: 10 September 1900; Kletsk, near Minsk
- Died: 18 October 1987 (aged 87); New York City.
- Occupation: Pathologist
- Known for: Serology of Rh disease

Philip Levine (August 10, 1900 – October 18, 1987) was an immuno-hematologist whose clinical research advanced knowledge on the Rhesus factor, Hemolytic disease of the newborn (HDN) and blood transfusion.

== Life and career ==
Levine was born in Kletsk, near Minsk (now in Belarus), then in the Russian Empire. He moved with his family to New York when he was 8 years old where his family took on a more English sounding surname. The family settled in Brooklyn where Levine graduated from Boys' High School. He received a bachelor's degree at City College and a master's degree and, in 1923, an M.D. degree at Cornell University Medical School. About 1925, Levine became assistant to Karl Landsteiner at the Rockefeller Institute, New York City. In 1932, he took up research work on the bacteriophage at the University of Wisconsin–Madison. Back in the east in 1935, he worked as a bacteriologist and serologist at Newark Beth Israel Hospital, New Jersey where, in 1939, Levine and Rufus E. Stetson published their findings about a family who had a stillborn baby in 1937 who had died of hemolytic disease of the newborn. This publication included the first suggestion that a mother could make blood group antibodies owing to immune sensitization to her fetus's red blood cells.

In 1944, Levine started a center for blood group research at the Ortho Research Foundation, Raritan, New Jersey. Ortho Research Foundation is now part of Ortho Clinical Diagnostics. Levine retired from Ortho in 1965, and this research center was renamed the Philip Levine Laboratories; he continued in emeritus status there until 1985.

== Awards ==
Extracted from the complete list of honors awarded to Levine in the Giblett publication on pp. 335f.

- 1944: Fellow of the American College of Physicians
- 1946: Albert Lasker Award for clinical research awarded to Levine jointly with Karl Landsteiner and Alexander Wiener for their work on the Rhesus factor, HDN and blood transfusion
- 1951: Passano Foundation Award
- 1956: AABB Karl Landsteiner Award
- 1956: Townsend Harris Medal, Alumni Association of New York City College
- 1959: Award of Merit of the Netherlands Red Cross
- 1960: Johnson Medal for research and development in immunohematology
- 1961: Life membership in the Harvey Society
- 1964:First Franz Oehlecker Award from German Society for Blood Transfusion
- 1965: Medal from German Red Cross
- 1966: Elected to the National Academy of Sciences
- 1966: Clemens von Pirquet Gold Medal from the 7th Forum on Allergy
- 1967: Honorary Doctor of Science from Michigan State University
- 1978: Honorary member of the International Society of Blood Transfusion
- 1978: Honorary life member of the New York Academy of Sciences
- 1980: Karl Landsteiner Gold Medal of Netherlands Red Cross
- 1983: Honorary Doctor of Science, University of Wisconsin

=== Legacy ===
In 1969, the American Society for Clinical Pathology (ASCP) started an award for clinical research and named it the Philip Levine Award after Levine

== See also ==
- History of medical advances in Rh disease
