= Apollo Energy Systems =

American energy company

- Industry: Alternative energy
- Predecessor: Electric Fuel Propulsion Corporation; Electric Auto Corporation
- Founded: 1966; 60 years ago in New Orleans, Louisiana
- Headquarters: Pompano Beach, Florida, U.S.
- Products: Alkaline fuel cells, batteries
- Divisions: Electric Propulsion; Apollo Power

Apollo Energy Systems is an American multinational alternative energy corporation headquartered in Pompano Beach, Florida. It develops, produces, and markets fuel cell power plants, electric propulsion systems, and alternative energy generation equipment. The company was founded by Robert R. Aronson in 1966 as the Electric Fuel Propulsion Corporation (EFP) in New Orleans, Louisiana. It later became known as the Electric Auto Corporation (EAC), and in 2001 changed to Apollo Energy Systems.

== Vehicles ==
Since the 1960s, the company's propulsion systems have powered a variety of platforms including the company's own brand of vehicles: Mars I, Mars II, Mars Van, Electric Eel, Voltair, EPF Hornet, Electrosport, X-144, Santa Fe, Thunderbolt, Transformer I, Silver Volt.

=== Mars I ===
In 1966, the company built and tested the Mars I electric car using a tri-polar lead-cobalt battery. The Mars I was based on a Renault Dauphine and was equipped with a 96-volt power source. On August 15, 1966, the Shilstone Testing Laboratory conducted a road test from New Orleans to Empire, LA and back. The results included a useful cruising range of 120.3 miles and a top speed of 52 mph, with an acceleration from 0 to 40 mph in 10 seconds. This demonstrated that the Mars I was suitable for city driving, and led to EPF's sudden move to Detroit, where automobiles were manufactured. Only one Mars I was ever produced. The name "Mars I" was suggested by the founder's son, who loved the Mars candy bar.

=== Mars II ===
Based on the 4-door, 5-passenger Renault R-10, 45 of these vehicles were produced in Ferndale, Michigan, during the years 1967 and 1968, and were sold primarily to utility companies in the USA. The Mars II operated on a 120-volt system, using tri-polar, lead-cobalt batteries (lead-acid) which could be charged to 80% capacity in 45-minutes. The D.C. motor was rated at 15 horsepower and the transmission was a manual, 4-speed. The power controller was manufactured by the Hartman Manufacturing Electrical Company and was a series/parallel switching system. Total driving range on pure battery was 146 miles on a single charge. According to an original EFP purchase order form, the car sold for $4,800.00.

==== Maiden voyage ====
EFP founder Robert R. Aronson drove the first Mars II from Detroit to Washington, D.C., between March 5 and 10, 1967. Eleven charge stops had been set up along the way at utility companies. A lot of time was taken by the press, and one day was lost due to a snowstorm. The purpose of the trip was to demonstrate the car to government officials in hope of obtaining Federal money for research and development.

==== Second voyage ====
April 1967. Hosted by Consumer's Power Co., the Mars II was driven from Detroit to Cadillac, Michigan, with charge points that had been set up in Flint, Saginaw, and Claire. Cost of recharging averaged about 1/2 cent per mile, compared to a 1-1/2 to 2 cents per mile average for internal combustion-powered cars. "When a gasoline company representative showed an interest in the car this morning, Aronson told him this was the only electric car to use gasoline also. "It has a gasoline heater system and uses about 20 cents worth of gasoline a week."

==== First delivery of a Mars II ====
According to an EFP brochure, J. Don Howard, President of Wisconsin Power and Light in Madison, Wisconsin took delivery of the first Mars II electric car in September 1967.

==== Cross-country trip ====
The second Mars II was driven from Detroit to Phoenix, Arizona, departing on September 20 and arriving on October 5, 1967. Passing thru nine states and making 36 planned stops for recharging the batteries at utility substations and restaurants, the Mars II covered approximately 2,000 miles. Aronson claimed that the actual distance was 2,226 miles and that the cost of electricity to charge the batteries totaled $27.26.

==== Los Angeles Water and Power delivery ====
Coming full circle, Robert R. Aronson made delivery of a Mars II to L.A. Water and Power on December 12, 1967. Growing up in Los Angeles and delivering telegrams for Western Union on his bicycle, Aronson as a young man first had the dream of producing non-polluting vehicles as he rode behind diesel-powered buses which emitted black smoke. Mayor Sam Yorty attended the unveiling ceremonies.

==== Other voyages ====
The Mars II made several other journeys during this period. One such trip was in May 1969 when the electric car traveled from Detroit to Houghton, Michigan, in the Upper Peninsula. Through the electric utility companies, charge points were set up at 60- to 70-mile intervals. The Mars II covered 1,266 miles at an average speed of 55 mph and maintained a fuel cost of less than a penny per mile. This demonstration resulted in AP and UPI news wire releases and radio and television interviews

=== Great Transcontinental Electric Car Race, 1967 sponsorship ===
In August 1967, EFP was a sponsor of the Great Transcontinental Electric Car Race, organizing all charge points at electric utility companies, each with a crew on call 24-hour per day (53 charge points/30 electric utilities). They provided the proprietary electric motors to both teams (Caltech and M.I.T), and the EFP tri-polar lead-cobalt batteries to the winner, Caltech.

=== World's first electric car expressway ===
In 1969, EFP, in cooperation with Holiday Inns, established the first electric car expressway on I-94, a 300-mile run from Detroit to Chicago. Charge stations were installed in Ann Arbor, Jackson, Kalamazoo, Michigan City, and Chicago. This allowed EFP to test its vehicles under real life conditions and to recharge at 50KW. The Holiday Inns along the way supplied coffee and refreshments during the 45-minute fast charges.

=== Radio personality Arthur Godfrey ===
On March 11, 1970, Arthur Godfrey drove the Mars II from the Ponchartrain Hotel in Detroit to the Holiday Inn West in Ann Arbor, a distance of 60 miles on I-94 at speeds up to 65 mph. He spoke about this trip on his daily radio show on March 23, 1970.

=== Clean Air Car Race ===
In the Pure Electric Division of the Clean Air Car Race, only two of the six pure-electric cars that were entered completed the 3,600-mile cross country run from Boston to Pasadena. Both vehicles were manufactured by Electric Fuel Propulsion Inc. of Detroit. The winning vehicle was a 1970 sedan called the EFP Hornet, driven by Cornell University students. The second was a converted Swedish mail truck called the Mars Van, driven by students from Stevens Institute of Technology. Electric utilities set up nearly 70 charge points along the way.

=== Mars Van / Electric Eel ===
During 1969 and 1970, EPF produced 12 electric delivery vans. These vans were based on the Daf Kalmar which was imported from Sweden. Although not officially tested, the company literature stated that the vehicle had a top speed of 45 mph, and could travel 75 miles on a single charge at that same speed. EFP's tri-polar lead cobalt battery was again used as the power source. Unique features included a variomatic belt drive transmission and a fiberglass body. During this same period, EFP also converted another Daf vehicle called The Electric Eel, based on the Daf 44 which had a top speed of 60 mph, and could travel 50 miles on a single charge at 50 mph, according to company literature.

EPF was awarded a contract to supply the U.S. Post Office with 4 Mars Vans. The projected performance was to have a top speed of 45 mph and to be capable of making 400 stops and starts without recharging which would cover a 6-hour route. At the time, a Gallup poll found that 36 million adults in the U.S. would have been willing to purchase an electric car.

=== Voltair ===
In 1969, EFP completed the design and a mock-up version of an electric car that was featured of the front cover of the February 1971 issue of Popular Science magazine. It was planned to be a hybrid vehicle, using both batteries and a fuel cell. The vehicle was never completed.

=== AMC conversions ===
During the years 1970–1976, EFP produced eight vehicles based on five American Motors cars: the EFP Hornet (2) Electrosport (1), X-144 (3), Santa Fe (1) and the EFP Hatchback (1). All were equipped with the tri-polar lead-cobalt battery and had top speeds ranging from 60 to 85 mph, and could travel from 40 to 101 miles on a single charge, according to company literature.

The EFP Hornet was powered by 1,500 pounds of tri-polar lead cobalt batteries and had a range of 70 miles in stop and go traffic with a top speed of 65 mph. The electric car could be charged at home or at special fast-charge stations. It operated on 144 volts and used a 20 hp electric motor. According to an article in the Duquesne Power and Light publication printed earlier in 1970, the car had a top speed of 85 mph and a range of 70 to 150 miles. No independent test results have been found. EFP planned to drop the Hornet in favor of the AMC Matador due to space problems and the ability to increase the size of the battery pack.

Only one Electrosport was produced. In 1971, EFP claimed a top speed of 79 mph and a range of 101 miles at 30 mph. Abercrombie & Fitch unveiled the Electrosport, an AMC Hornet station wagon, on January 28, 1972, at their new Royal Poinciana Plaza shop in Palm Beach, Florida. Palm Beach was chosen for a test market due to its flat terrain, mild climate and isolation from metropolitan areas.

The EFP X-144 was named for its 144-volt battery pack. A total of 3 X-144's were produced in 1972 and '73. Top speed was reported by EFP to be 70 mph with a driving range of 70 miles at 50 mph. The X-144 was an AMC Gremlin, beefed up with Ambassador suspension and brakes and was available with either a manual or automatic transmission. It was equipped with a slow charger on board that would fully charge the batteries overnight. The vehicle was reported to have a much smoother acceleration.

The Santa Fe was based on an AMC Matador. Only one of these were produced in 1974. These were to be used in an Avis Rent a Car pilot project in Chicago. According to Avis, one charge will last for 8 to 12 hours of city driving at speeds up to 60 mph. EFP testing resulted in a top speed of 70 mph and a cruising range of 60 miles at 50 mph.

One EFP Hatchback was produced in 1976. This electric car was based on an AMC Hornet hatchback. EFP reported a top speed of 60 mph and a range of 40 miles at 50 mph.

The availability of AMC vehicles came to an end and EFP soon entered into talks with General Motors.

=== Thunderbolt ===
Based on "a standard Detroit production body", the Thunderbolt was to become available in the Fall of 1974 for a sales price of $7,500.00. Robert R. Aronson, the company founder claimed to have orders for 2,000 vehicles as of March 1974, and expected orders for several thousand more by April '74. Avis had mentioned that they were considering to introduce the electric car in Chicago and later in Manhattan and Las Vegas. The electric car fleet in Chicago was to be accompanied by a series of fast-charge stations, to be located at service stations, motels, parking garages and shopping malls. However EFP only built two Thunderbolts in 1975.

=== Transformer 1 ===
Billed as the world's first full sized luxury electric car for people of vision, the target for the first year of production was 2,500 vehicles. The first production run of six vehicles was handled by Creative Industries of Detroit. Robert R. Aronson, who had developed a fast charge battery in the '60s, said that it had taken every dollar that he could beg or borrow to finally be ready to unveil the Transformer I. The two-door electric car was a modified GM Chevrolet Chevelle. Long time friend Arthur Godfrey drove the first Transformer I at a press conference at the Raleigh House in Southfield, Michigan on May 14, 1975. Powered by a 180-volt tri-polar lead cobalt battery, the Transformer I had a cruising range of 75 miles at 55 mph, and a top speed of 80 mph, according to company literature. The Transformer I made an appearance at the Greater Los Angeles Auto Show in January 1977.

EFP also offered a mobile power plant which was a gasoline engine on a trailer that could be used to charge the batteries on long-distance trips, eliminating the need to stop and recharge the batteries. It was created by Richard McClean of Wolverine Diesel in Traverse City, Michigan.

=== Electric limousine ===
EFP produced two electric limousines in 1978. They came with air conditioning, power brakes, power steering, power seats, power door locks, power windows, AM/FM radio, and a CB radio. The price tag on this electric car was to be $120,000.00. This vehicle was equipped with an auxiliary power unit that supplied power for the accessories and also to extend the range on the vehicle.

=== Silver Volt ===
Based on the GM type A vehicle, the Silver Volt was produced in two versions, a pure electric (2) and a hybrid (12). These were originally to be produced in Puerto Rico but eventually the new plant ended up in Freeport, Grand Bahama. Initially projected to sell for $14,500.00, the car was offered in November 1982 at around $50,000, according to company literature. Projected performance: a top speed of 70 mph with a range in excess of 150 miles combining battery power with a gasoline-powered 10 KW rotary engine range extender. These numbers were later revised in 1981 to 65–100 miles on pure battery power and 85–120 miles using the APU. The same patented tri-polar lead cobalt batteries, incorporating an automatic watering system were used again as in all other EFP electric cars. Initially, the vehicle was to have a 150-volt system using an SCR controller with regenerative braking. Later the voltage was reported to be 144 volts.

In 1980, Detroit Testing Laboratories made a series of tests on the Silver Volt. The test purpose was to determine the range of the Silver Volt, model 104, in 8 and 12-hour test runs at an average driving speed of 50 mph. According to test results, the specific energy of the battery was 37 watt-hours per kilogram, discharging for 5 hours and 50 minutes at 50 amps. DTL concluded on September 5, 1980, that the Silver Volt could easily be driven at freeway speeds for an extended period of time covering distances of 212.4 miles in 8 hours, and 307.5 miles in 12 hours, including recharging time. The APU was not used in any of these tests. Later, in July 1982, DTL performed top speed testing and determined that the average top speed was 76 mph.

==== Beverly Hills debut ====
On June 17, 1981, the Silver Volt made its debut at the Beverly Hilton Hotel in Beverly Hills, California. "My life's dedication is to clear the air in Los Angeles", said inventor Aronson. Entertainer Lawrence Welk was on hand for the introduction.

== Product line ==
Apollo alkaline fuel cell
Alkaline fuel cells played a key part in the success of the 1960s U.S. Space Program that put a man on the moon for the first time. The AES R&D Group, led by Karl Kordesch of the Graz University of Technology in Austria, improved this fuel cell and adapted it for terrestrial, undersea, and extra-terrestrial usage.

Apollo tri-polar lead cobalt battery
A battery that is in its fifth generation. It has a higher power density, quicker recharging capability, as well as comparatively lighter weight than its predecessors, due to the use of lead foam. They are an alternative to the nickel metal hydride or the lithium ion types of battery.
