= Lewis Urry =

Canadian engineer and inventor (1927-2004)

- Born: Lewis Frederick Urry; 29 January 1927; Pontypool, Ontario, Canada
- Died: 19 October 2004 (aged 77)
- Occupations: Chemical engineer; inventor

Lewis Frederick Urry (29 January 1927 – 19 October 2004) was a Canadian-American chemical engineer and inventor. He invented both the alkaline battery and lithium battery while working for the Eveready Battery company.

== Life ==
Urry was born January 29, 1927, in Pontypool, Ontario, and graduated with a degree in chemical engineering from the University of Toronto in 1950, having previously spent time serving in the Canadian army. He went to work for Eveready Battery a few months after graduating. He was married to Beverley Ann (died 1993) and they had 3 sons and 2 daughters. He died October 19, 2004, and is buried in Butternut Ridge Cemetery, in Eaton Township, Ohio.

== Career ==
In 1955, Urry was dispatched to the company's laboratory in Parma, Ohio, in order to discover a way of extending the lifespan of the zinc-carbon battery. The low longevity of these batteries had been seriously damaging sales. Urry realized that developing a new battery would be more cost-effective than developing the old ones further.

Throughout the 1950s, many engineers had experimented with alkaline batteries, but nobody had been able to develop a longer-running battery which was worth the higher cost of production. Urry, after testing a number of materials, discovered that manganese dioxide and solid zinc worked well coupled with an alkaline substance as an electrolyte. His main problem was that the battery could not provide enough power. Urry managed to overcome this problem by using powdered zinc.

On October 9, 1957, Lewis Urry, Karl Kordesch, and P.A. Marsal filed US patent (2,960,558) for this revolutionary alkaline dry cell battery with a powdered zinc gel anode. It was granted on November 15, 1960, and assigned to Union Carbide Corporation.

In order to sell the idea to his managers, Urry put the battery in a toy car and raced it round the canteen against a similar car with one of the older batteries. His new invention had many times the durability, and Eveready began production of Urry's design in 1959.

In 1980, the brand was renamed Energizer. Modern alkaline batteries, due to technological improvements, can last as much as 40 times longer than the original prototype.

In 1999, Urry gave his first prototype battery, along with the first commercially produced cylindrical battery, to the Smithsonian Institution. Both cells are now displayed in the same room as Edison's light bulb.
