= August Musger =

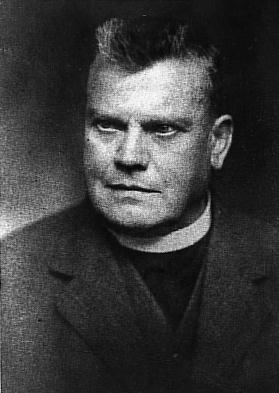
August Musger

Professor August Musger (February 10, 1868 in Eisenerz, Duchy of Styria, Austria-Hungary – October 30, 1929 in Graz, Styria, Austria) was an Austrian priest and physicist who is best remembered for his invention of slow motion.

== Invention ==
Musger invented the slow motion technique using a mirrored drum as a synchronizing mechanism. The device he used was patented in 1904 and was first presented in Graz, Styria in 1907 using a projector made by K. Löffler, owner of a cinema.
