= Karl Kordesch =

Austrian chemist and inventor

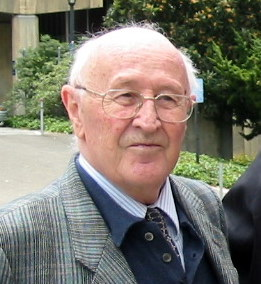
- Karl Kordesch, 2003
- Born: 18 March 1922; Vienna, Austria
- Died: 12 January 2011 (aged 88); Eugene, Oregon, USA
- Citizenship: Austria, USA
- Education: University of Vienna (PhD, 1948)
- Known for: Invention of alkaline battery
- Awards: Wilhelm Exner Medal, 1967
- Scientific career
- Fields: Alkaline battery, fuel cells, electric vehicles
- Workplaces: Eveready, Union Carbide, Graz University of Technology, BTI, Apollo Energy Systems

Karl Kordesch (18 March 1922 – 12 January 2011) was an Austrian chemist and inventor, most notable for jointly inventing the alkaline battery. In 1953 he moved to the United States as part of Operation Paperclip.

== Life ==
Kordesch was born in Vienna. He studied chemistry and physics at the University of Vienna, and earned his doctoral degree in 1948. From 1948–53 he worked at the university's Chemical Institute. He was then recruited as a member of Operation Paperclip and moved to the United States, where from 1953–55 he was head of the Battery Division of the U.S. Signal Corps in Fort Monmouth. In 1955 he joined Union Carbide in Ohio, working with two fellow Austrians. He led two research groups: one concerned with the development of manganese dioxide batteries, the other devoted to fuel cells. During this time Kordesch filed 22 patents.

In 1957, Karl Kordesch, Paul A. Marsal and Lewis Urry filed US patent (2,960,558) for the alkaline dry cell battery, which eventually became the D-sized Eveready Energizer battery. It was granted in 1960.

Another fundamental contribution that changed the battery world was the creation of the thin carbon fuel cell electrode. He presented a fuel cell demonstration at the Brussels World Fair in 1958, using a suitcase with a hydrogen-oxygen fuel cell. His development of thin electrodes for fuel cells came soon thereafter.

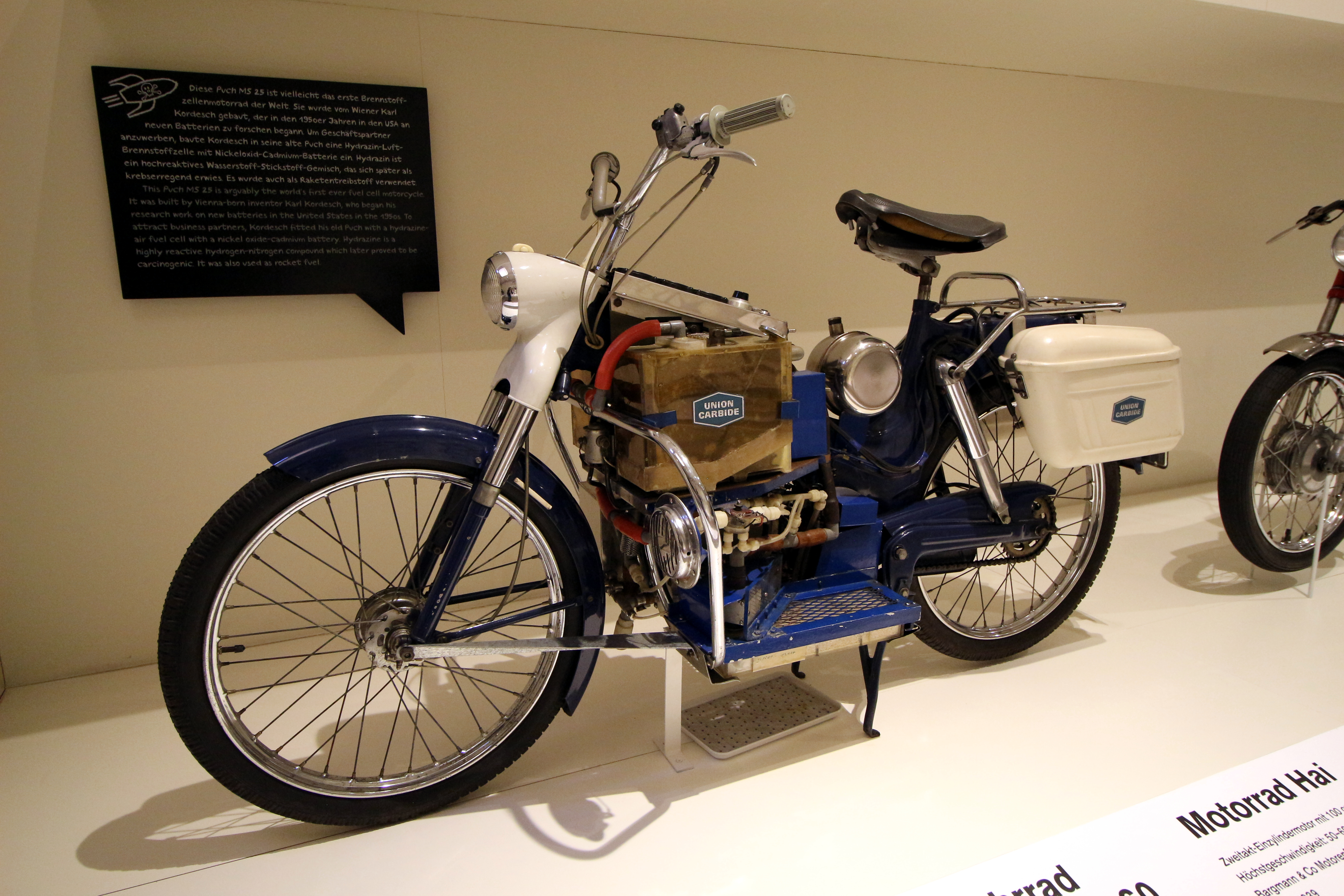
A Puch MS 25 with a hydrazine-air fuel cell, developed by Karl Kordesch

In 1967 he built a fuel cell/NiCad battery hybrid electric motorcycle. The motorcycle was featured in television commercials for the program 21st Century, hosted by Walter Cronkite. He relished telling people how he had to join the actors' union to ride in the commercials. It was fitted with a hydrazine fuel cell, capable of 200 miles to the U.S. gallon.

In 1970 he fitted his own Austin A40 with a hydrogen fuel cell (ammonia being too hard to come by), and used the adapted vehicle as his personal transportation for over three years. The vehicle retained enough room inside for four passengers and had a driving range of 180 miles. His fuel cell design provided the basis for the 40 kWh alkaline hydrogen-oxygen fuel cell for the General Motors Electrovan.

In 1977 he was granted early retirement by Union Carbide and returned to Austria, becoming director of the Institute for Inorganic Technology at the Graz University of Technology (TU Graz). From 1981–83 Kordesch was general secretary of the International Society of Electrochemistry (ISE). From 1985–87 he was Dean of the Science and Technology Faculty at TU Graz; in 1992 he became emeritus.

In 1997 he became vice-president of Apollo Energy Systems, and was tasked with the continued development of fuel cells. His research continued at TU Graz on fuel cell electrode performance, low-cost fuel cell stack design, propulsion fuel (NH_{3}), and an ammonia cracker. He was gratified to see the electric car and the hybrid-electric make a comeback in his last years. He was 40 years early with the electric hybrid vehicles that he enjoyed building and driving.

In total, he filed 120 patents and produced numerous books and over 200 publications on batteries and fuel cells.

He died in Eugene, Oregon, in 2011.

== Selected works ==
- Einsatz der Brennstoffzellentechnologie für die dezentrale Energienutzung II, 1999, with Günter Simader (in German)
- Fuel Cells and Their Applications, with Günter Simader, 2007, ISBN 3-527-29777-4
- Batteries: Volume 1 – Manganese Dioxide, New York, 1974, ISBN 0-8247-6084-0

== Distinctions ==
- 1967 Wilhelm Exner Medal
- 1986 Technology Award (Vittorio de Nora Award) of the U.S. Electrochemical Society
- 1990 Erwin Schrödinger Prize of the Austrian Academy of Sciences
- 1990 Honorary doctorate from the Vienna University of Technology
- 1992 Auer v. Welsbach Medal of the Society of Austrian Chemists
- 1992 Gold award from the state of Styria, Austria (Großes Goldenes Ehrenzeichen des Landes Steiermark)

.
