= Erwin Popper =

Austrian physician (1879–1955)

Erwin Popper (9 December 1879 − 28 September 1955) was an Austrian physician, who, in 1909, along with Karl Landsteiner discovered the infectious character of poliomyelitis.

Popper wrote his doctoral thesis in Vienna in 1903 and then became a military surgeon with the artillery. From 1904 to 1905, he worked as a candidate and assistant physician at the Wiedner Hospital in Vienna, then moved to the Wilhelminenspital. In 1911, he became a resident doctor at the Allgemeine Poliklinik (outpatients clinic). From 1918 onwards, he worked as a paediatrician in Vienna and director of the pediatric ambulance of the Vienna Krankenkasse (statutory medical insurance company). In 1938, he emigrated to England and held jobs as a Medical Officer in children’s homes until 1942. Subsequently, he worked as a Resident Medical Officer in Cheshire until 1945.

== Sources ==
- Paul Speiser: Karl Landsteiner, Entdecker der Blutgruppen und Pionier der Immunologie; Biographie eines Nobelpreisträgers aus der Wiener Medizinischen Schule, 3rd edition, Berlin, Blackwell Ueberreuter-Wiss. 1990 ISBN 3-89412-084-3, page 150
