= Karl Landsteiner =

Austrian-American immunologist (1868–1943)

Karl Landsteiner ForMemRS
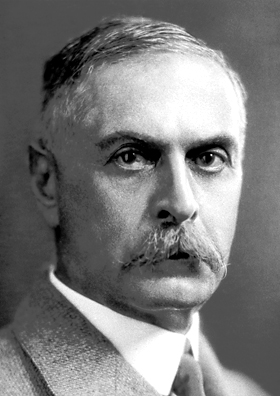
- Born: 14 June 1868; Baden bei Wien, Austria-Hungary
- Died: 26 June 1943 (aged 75); New York City, US
- Citizenship: Austria; United States (from 1929)
- Education: University of Vienna (MD, 1891)
- Known for: Research of blood group system, discovery of Rh factor, discovery of poliovirus
- Awards: Nobel Prize in Physiology or Medicine (1930); Cameron Prize for Therapeutics of the University of Edinburgh (1938); Lasker-DeBakey Clinical Medical Research Award (posthumous, 1946)
- Scientific career
- Fields: Medicine; virology
- Workplaces: University of Vienna; Rockefeller Institute for Medical Research

Signature
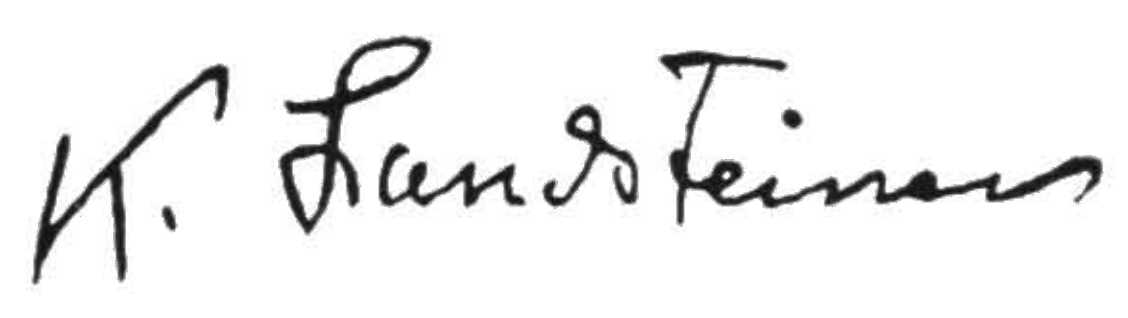

Karl Landsteiner ForMemRS (German: [kaʁl ˈlantˌʃtaɪnɐ]; 14 June 1868 – 26 June 1943) was an Austrian-American biologist, physician, and immunologist. He emigrated with his family to New York in 1923 at the age of 55 for professional opportunities, working for the Rockefeller Institute.

He had distinguished the main blood groups in 1901, having developed the modern system of classification of blood groups from his identification of the presence of agglutinins in the blood. In 1937, with Alexander S. Wiener, he identified the Rhesus factor, thus enabling physicians to transfuse blood without endangering the patient's life. With Constantin Levaditi and Erwin Popper, he discovered the polio virus in 1909. He received the Aronson Prize in 1926. In 1930, he received the Nobel Prize in Physiology or Medicine. He was posthumously awarded the Lasker Award in 1946, and has been described as the father of transfusion medicine.

== Early life and education ==
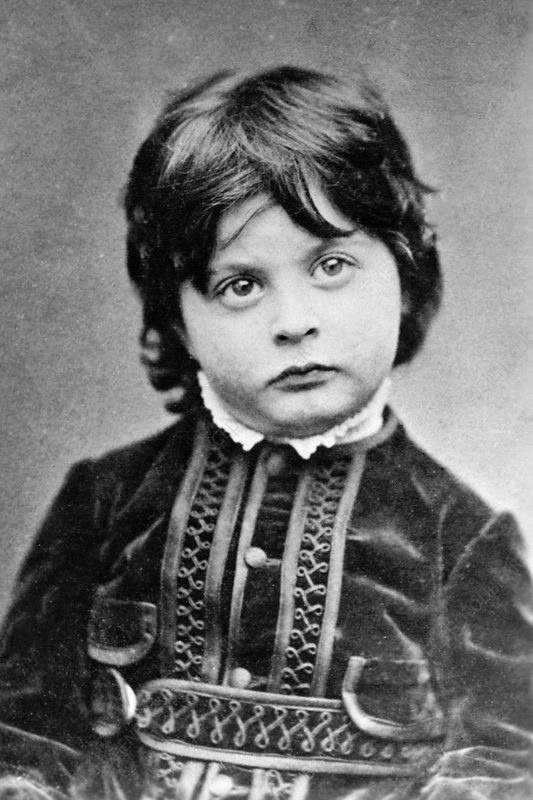
Landsteiner as a child

He was born into a Jewish family. His father Leopold Landsteiner (1818–1875), a renowned Viennese journalist and editor-in-chief of Die Presse, died at age 56, when Karl was 6. The boy became very close to his mother Fanny (née Hess; 1837–1908). After graduating with the Matura exam from a Vienna secondary school, he took up the study of medicine at the University of Vienna. Landsteiner wrote his doctoral thesis in 1891. While still a student he published an essay on the influence of diets on the composition of blood.

From 1891 to 1893, Landsteiner studied chemistry in Würzburg under Hermann Emil Fischer, in Munich, Eugen Bamberger and in Zurich under Arthur Rudolf Hantzsch. He had a number of publications from that period, some of them in co-operation with his professors.

== Research work in Vienna; discovery of the polio virus ==
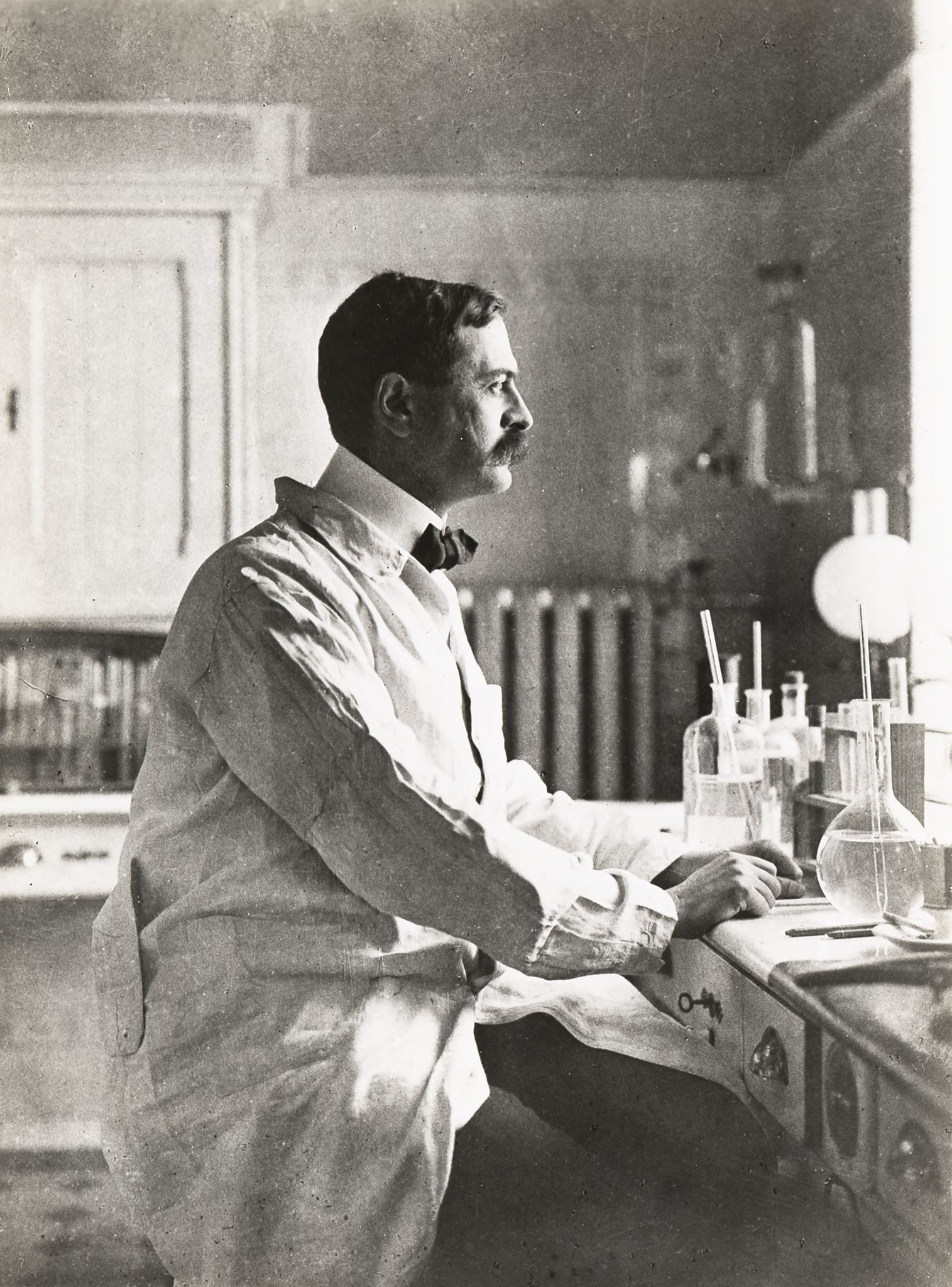
Landsteiner in the lab

After returning to Vienna he became an assistant to Max von Gruber at the Hygienic Institute. In his studies he concentrated on the mechanism of immunity and the nature of antibodies. From November 1897 to 1908 Landsteiner was an assistant at the pathological-anatomical institute of the University of Vienna under Anton Weichselbaum, where he published 75 papers, dealing with issues in serology, bacteriology, virology and pathological anatomy. In addition he did some 3,600 autopsies in those ten years. Weichselbaum was Landsteiner's tutor for his postdoctoral lecture qualification in 1903. From 1908 to 1920 Landsteiner was prosector at the Wilhelminenspital in Vienna and in 1911 he was sworn in as an associate professor of pathological anatomy. During that time he discovered – in co-operation with Erwin Popper – the infectious character of poliomyelitis and isolated the polio virus. In recognition of this groundbreaking discovery, which proved to be the basis for the fight against polio, he was posthumously inducted into the Polio Hall of Fame at Warm Springs, Georgia, which was dedicated in January 1958.

== Research of the blood groups ==
In 1900 Landsteiner found out that the blood of two people under contact agglutinates, and in 1901 he found that this effect was due to contact of blood with blood serum. As a result, he succeeded in identifying the three blood groups A, B and O, which he labelled C, of human blood. Landsteiner also found out that blood transfusion between persons with the same blood group did not lead to the destruction of blood cells, whereas this occurred between persons of different blood groups. Based on his findings, the first successful blood transfusion was performed by Reuben Ottenberg at Mount Sinai Hospital in New York in 1907.

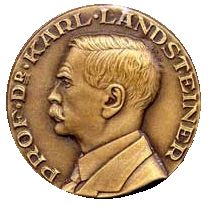
Karl Landsteiner depicted on a medal awarded by the Netherlands Red Cross

Today, whole blood transfusions are rare. It is now well known that persons with blood group AB can accept red blood cell donations of the other blood groups, and that persons with blood group O-negative can donate red blood cells to all other groups. Individuals with blood group AB are referred to as universal recipients and those with blood group O-negative are known as universal donors. These donor-recipient relationships arise due to the fact that type O-negative blood possesses neither antigens of blood group A nor of blood group B. Therefore, the immune systems of persons with blood group A, B or AB do not refuse the donation. Further, because persons with blood group AB do not form antibodies against either the antigens of blood group A or B, they can accept red blood cells from persons with these blood groups, as well as from persons with blood group O-negative.

In 1930 Landsteiner was awarded the Nobel Prize in Physiology or Medicine in recognition of these achievements. For his pioneering work, he is recognized as the father of transfusion medicine.

== Research work in the Netherlands and the United States ==
After World War I, Vienna and the new republic of Austria as a whole was in a desolate economic state, a situation in which Landsteiner did not see any possibilities to carry on with his research work. He decided to move to the Netherlands and accepted a post as prosector in the small Catholic St. Joannes de Deo hospital (now HMC Westeinde) in The Hague and, in order to improve his financial situation also took a job in a small factory, producing old tuberculin (tuberculinum pristinum). He also published a number of papers, five of them being published in Dutch by the Royal Academy of Sciences. Yet working conditions proved to be not much better than in post-war Vienna.

So Landsteiner accepted the invitation that reached him from New York, initiated by Simon Flexner, who was familiar with Landsteiner's work, to work for the Rockefeller Institute. He arrived there with his family in the spring of 1923. Throughout the 1920s Landsteiner worked on the problems of immunity and allergy. In 1927 he discovered new blood groups: M, N and P, refining the work he had begun 20 years before. Shortly thereafter, Landsteiner and his collaborator, Philip Levine, published the work and, later that same year, the types began to be used in paternity suits.

== Awards and honours ==
In addition to winning the Nobel Prize in Physiology or Medicine, Landsteiner was elected to the National Academy of Sciences in 1932, elected to the American Philosophical Society in 1935, and awarded the Cameron Prize for Therapeutics of the University of Edinburgh in 1937. He was elected a Foreign Member of the Royal Society (ForMemRS) in 1941. In 1946, he was posthumously awarded the Lasker-DeBakey Clinical Medical Research Award. Since 2005, World Blood Donor Day is celebrated on Landsteiner's birthday anniversary.

== Personal life ==
Landsteiner converted from Judaism to Christianity in 1890, and was baptised into the Catholic Church. In 1916, he married Leopoldine Helene Wlasto, a Greek Orthodox woman who converted to her husband's Catholic faith.

In 1937, Landsteiner unsuccessfully initiated legal action against an American publisher who had included him in the book Who's Who in American Jewry. Landsteiner said that "it will be detrimental to me to emphasize publicly the religion of my ancestors."

Landsteiner had a heart attack on 24 June 1943 in his lab and died two days later, on 26 June, in a hospital.

== See also ==
- List of Jewish Nobel laureates
- Jan Janský
