= Alexander S. Wiener =

American geneticist

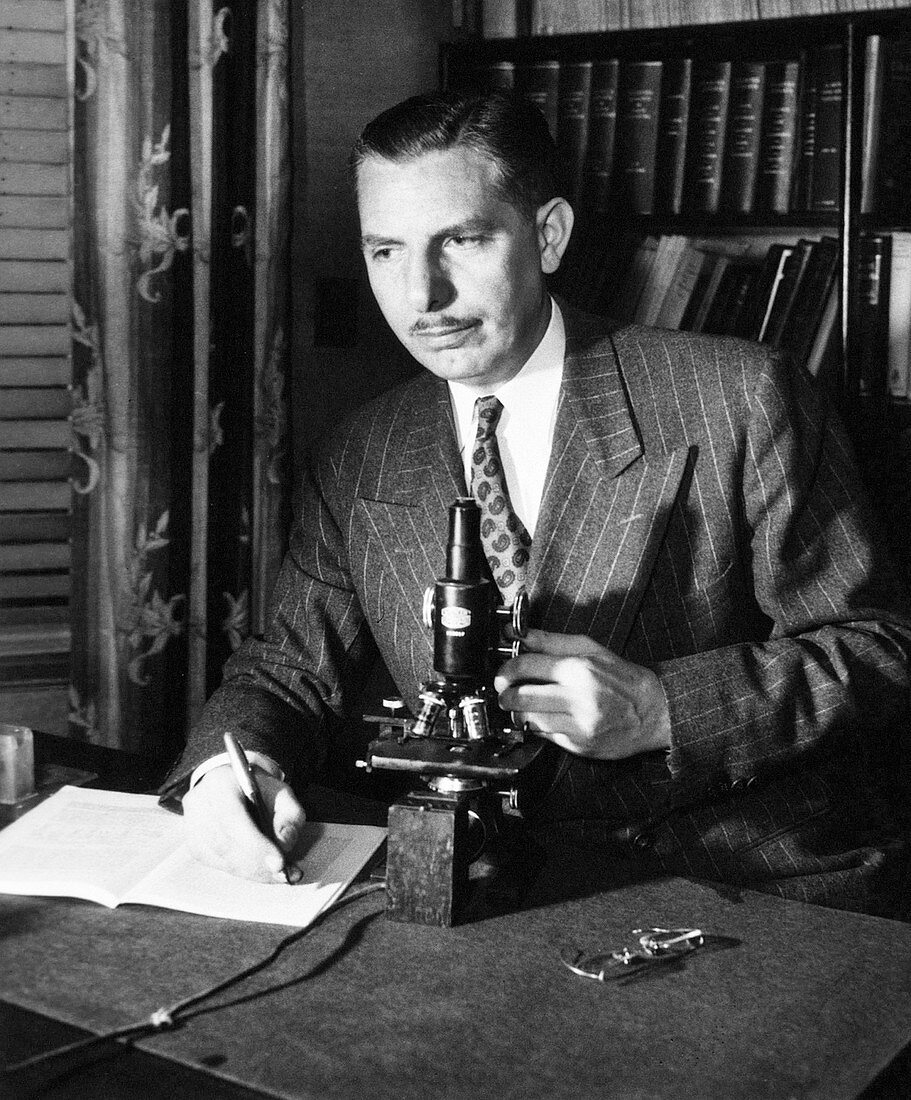
- Born: March 16, 1907; New York City
- Died: November 6, 1976 (aged 69); New York City
- Education: Cornell University
- Known for: discovery of Rhesus factor
- Spouse: Gertrude Rodman
- Children: Jane Einhorn, Barbara Krevit
- Awards: Albert Lasker Award for clinical research awarded jointly with Karl Landsteiner and Philip Levine for their work on the Rhesus factor, HDN and blood transfusion
- Scientific career
- Fields: forensic medicine; serology; blood transfusion

Alexander Solomon Wiener (March 16, 1907 – November 6, 1976) was an American biologist and physician, specializing in the fields of forensic medicine, serology, and immunogenetics. His work led to the discovery of the Rh factor in 1937, along with Karl Landsteiner, and subsequently to the development of exchange transfusion methods that saved the lives of infants with hemolytic disease of the newborn. He received a Lasker Award for his achievement in 1946.

== Life ==
Alexander Solomon Wiener was born in Brooklyn, New York and grew up in Lefferts Manor, Brooklyn, the son of George Wiener, an attorney who had emigrated from Russia in 1903, and Mollie (Zuckerman) Wiener. He attended Brooklyn public schools, graduating from Brooklyn Boys' High School at the age of 15. He was awarded scholarships to attend Cornell University where he continued his study of mathematics and even contributed mathematical problems to the American Mathematical Monthly. He majored in biology, however, receiving his A.B. in 1926. He then entered the Long Island College of Medicine where he was awarded an M.D. in 1930.

During his time in medical school Wiener did research work on blood groups at the Jewish Hospital of Brooklyn and from 1930 to 1932 he interned there and kept up a lifelong affiliation with that institution as the head of the Division of Genetics and Biometrics (1933–1935) and as the head of the blood transfusion division until 1952. From 1932 he had a medical practice and in 1935 he founded the Wiener Laboratories for clinical pathology and blood grouping. In 1938 he became a member of the Department of Forensic Medicine of New York University School of Medicine, rising to the rank of professor by 1968. From the 1930s he co-operated with the office of the Chief Medical Examiner of New York City.

Wiener was a good pianist and enjoyed tennis and golf. He kept up his lifelong interest in mathematics and physics by reading in these areas. In recognition of his contribution to forensic medicine he was awarded an honorary membership of the Mystery Writers of America.

In 1932 Wiener married Gertrude Rodman and they had two daughters, Jane and Barbara. Wiener died of leukemia in New York on November 6, 1976.

== Contributions in hematology ==
=== Blood "fingerprinting" ===
Wiener began working with Landsteiner at the age of 23, shortly after beginning his work at Brooklyn Jewish Hospital, where he remained for the rest of his life. Much of their initial work revolved around the M Factor, which they discovered was actually five different, distinct blood factors.

This encouraged them in their quest to create a blood "fingerprint," a unique blood profile that could be used in legal and criminal matters. Wiener pioneered much of the type of blood testing that has now, in the age of DNA, become commonplace. Along with his work in his Brooklyn lab, Wiener also did a considerable amount of work in a Manhattan lab where he concentrated on forensics, assisting the police in numerous investigations by analyzing the blood (or related fluids) of those involved.

Numerous articles and chapters of books with real life crime stories were written about Dr. Wiener's work in criminology. Along with his father, George Wiener, a lawyer. Wiener helped draft a new set of laws addressing the recent scientific advancements in blood identification. He was a member of the American Medical Association legal committee that sponsored blood test laws in all states, and he was the co-author of its 1935 report. His work in the genetics of the blood factors also allowed him to be of assistance in many paternity cases.

=== Rh factor ===
When Wiener and Landsteiner discovered the Rh factor in 1937 (named after the Rhesus monkeys used as test subjects), they did not immediately realize its significance. It was seen as yet another factor, not much different from the M, N, or P factors—useful for "fingerprinting," but not having much more extended implications. However, Wiener soon realized that the new blood factor they had discovered was associated with problems in blood transfusions. Although the first time Rh positive blood is transfused into someone with Rh negative blood, it may not cause any harm, it does cause the creation of antibodies which make a second such transfusion very dangerous. By the time he and Landsteiner published in 1940, Wiener was able to demonstrate the role of Rh sensitization as a cause of intragroup hemolytic reactions, thus increasing the safety of blood transfusions.

Also, in conjunction with Philip Levine's separate work which helped identify the Rh factor as a major cause of erythroblastosis fetalis, or Rh disease, he was able to help solve a major cause of infant fatality. In 1946, Dr. Wiener created the first medical procedure to combat the problem, which he called an exchange transfusion. It consisted of a complete blood transfusion for the affected baby. Harry Wallerstein, a transfusionist, further refined the method.

Since then, less extreme methods have been found to deal with erythroblastosis fetalis. However, at the time, the procedure saved over 200,000 lives.

=== Nomenclature and genetics ===
A lot of Wiener's later work involved examining the genetics of the Rh factor. In the process, he became embroiled in controversy, as an alternative theory, the so-called CDE-nomenclature was proposed by Robert Russell Race and Ronald Fisher, hence also called Race-Fisher theory, which was somewhat simpler to understand. Although Wiener's theories on the genetics of the Rh factor have recently proven to be closer to the actual DNA structure of the genes (though the current scientific understanding combines aspects of the two theories), there are still many who have adopted the CDE notations.

Wiener's theory is that Rh inheritance is controlled as follows: There is one Rh locus at which occurs one Rh gene, but this gene has multiple alleles. For example, one gene R1 produces one agglutinogen (antigen) Rh1 which is composed of three "factors": rh', Rh(o), and hr' '. The three factors are analogous to C, D, and e respectively in the CDE nomenclature. The d gene does not exist in Wiener's theory, and, has been proven not to exist at all.

It has recently been proven that there are two connected genes, one of which has multiple specificities, as Wiener theorized. So although he was incorrect to theorize that only one gene was involved, the principle that a single gene can have multiple alleles, a revolutionary idea at the time, has proven true.

== Awards ==
- 1946 Albert Lasker Award for clinical research awarded jointly with Karl Landsteiner and Philip Levine
- 1951 Passano Foundation Award

== Publications ==
- Rh-Hr Blood Types, New York 1954
- with Irving Bernard Wexler: Heredity of the Blood Groups, New York 1958
- with Karl Landsteiner: An agglutinable factor in human blood recognized by immune sera for rhesus blood. Proc Soc Exp Biol Med 1940;43:223-224.
