= Mozartkugel =

Confection made to honor Wolfgang Amadeus Mozart

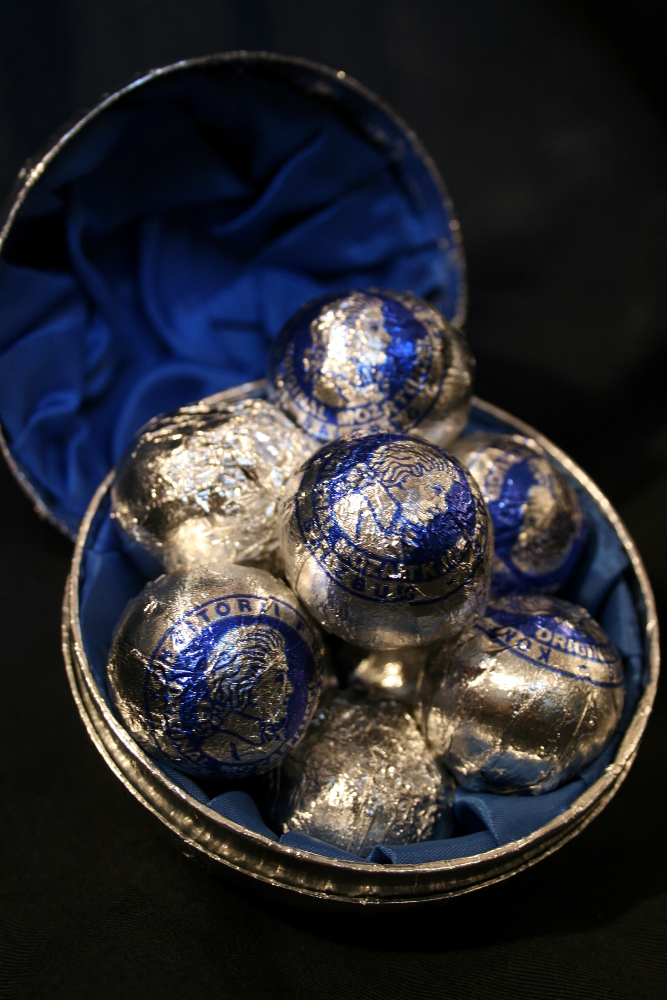
- Fürst Original Mozartkugeln
- Alternative names: Mozart-Bonbon
- Type: Confectionery
- Place of origin: Salzburg, Austria
- Main ingredients: pistachio, marzipan, nougat, dark chocolate

A Mozartkugel (German: [ˈmoːtsaʁtˌkuːɡl̩]; English: "Mozart ball"; pl. Mozartkugeln) is a small, round sugar confection made of pistachio, marzipan, and nougat that is covered with dark chocolate. It was originally known as Mozart-Bonbon, created in 1890 by Salzburg confectioner Paul Fürst (1856–1941) and named after Wolfgang Amadeus Mozart. Handmade Original Salzburger Mozartkugeln are manufactured by Fürst's descendants up to today, while similar products have been developed by numerous confectioners, often industrially produced.

== Origins ==
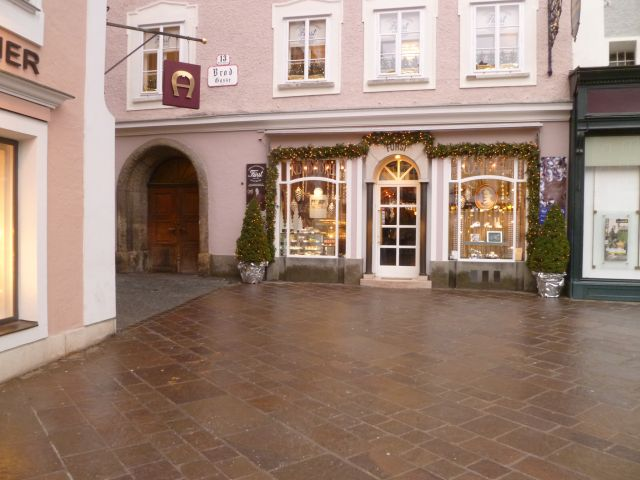
Fürst pastry shop, Salzburg

Paul Fürst's family descended from Dinkelsbühl; he himself was born in Sierning, Upper Austria, and was raised in Salzburg. Upon the early death of his father, he lived in the house of his uncle, who owned a confectionery at No. 13, Brodgasse. Fürst took over his uncle's business and trained as an apprentice in Vienna, Budapest, Paris, and Nice. In 1884, he opened his own pastry shop at No. 13, Brodgasse, where he, by his own account, created the Mozart-Bonbon praline after lengthy trials in 1890. As his specialty became increasingly popular, Fürst established a company that continues to sell Mozartkugeln. However, he had not applied for a patent to protect his invention, and soon, other Salzburg cake shops began to sell similar products.

== Recipe ==
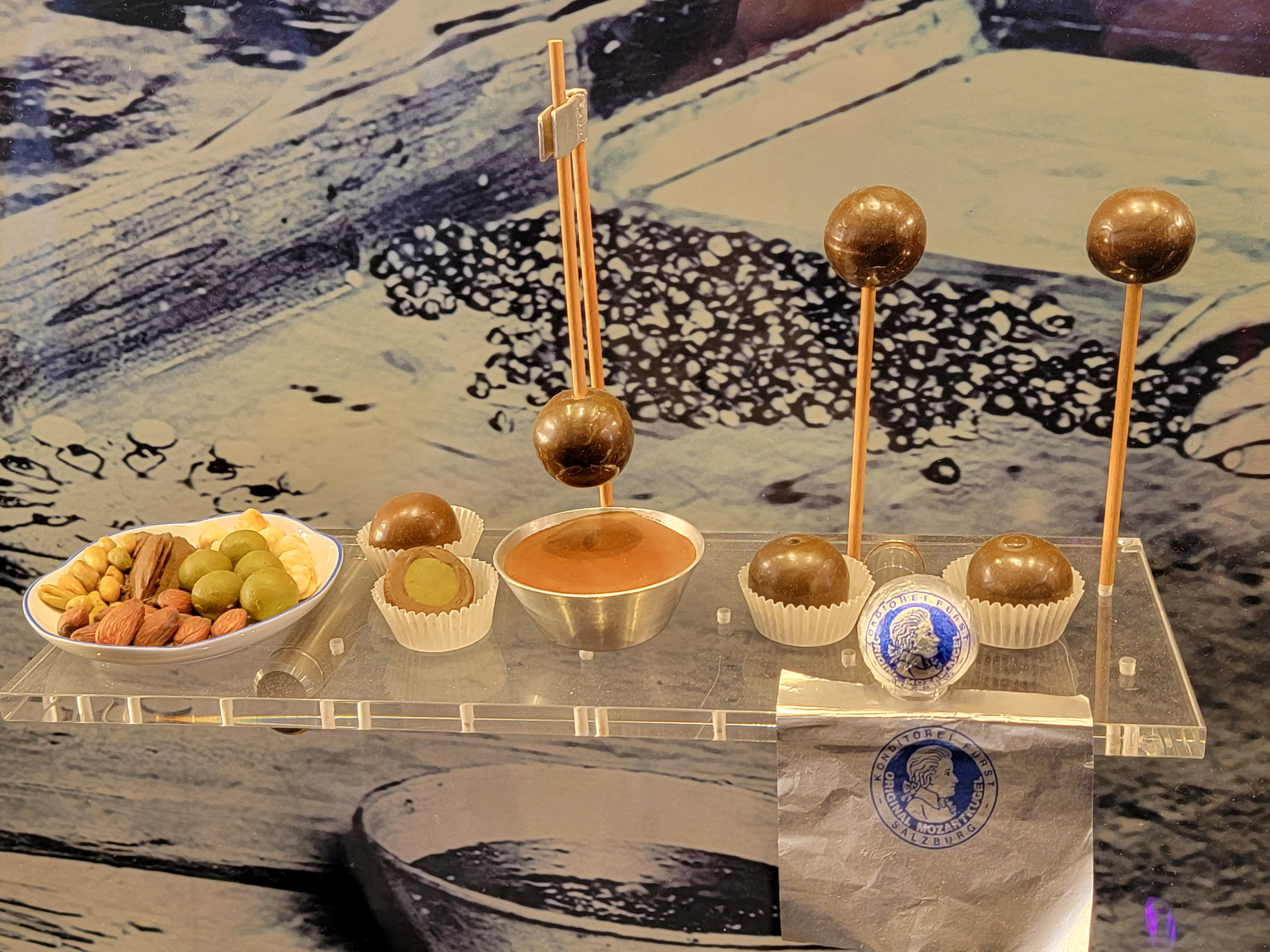
Stages of Mozartkugel production

The original recipe for Mozartkugeln is: A ball of marzipan combined with pistachio and covered in a layer of nougat is produced. This ball is then placed on a small wooden stick and coated in dark chocolate. The stick is then placed vertically, with the ball at the top, on a platform to allow the chocolate to cool off and harden. Finally, the stick is removed; the hole that it leaves behind is filled with chocolate coating, and the ball is wrapped in metal foil. The balls remain fresh for about eight weeks at room temperature.

== Name dispute ==
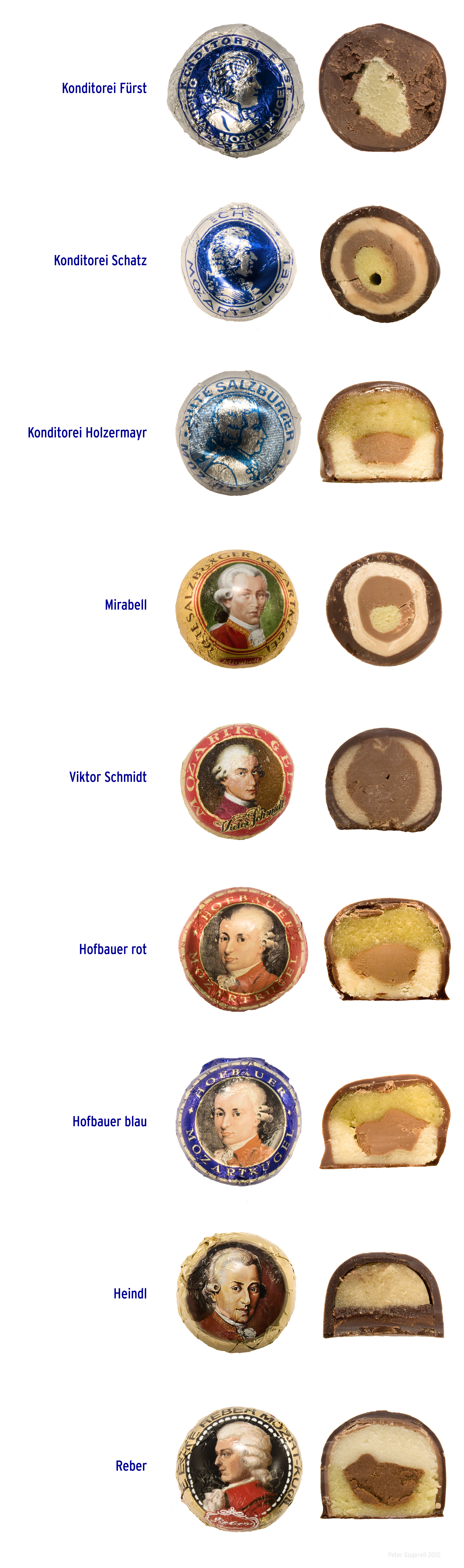
Assorted Mozartkugeln

When imitation products began to appear, Fürst initiated a court process to attempt to secure a trademark. At first, the dispute concerned only confectionery producers in Salzburg, but later spread to include the competition from Germany. The result was an agreement that obliged Fürst's competitors to use other names. The Mirabell firm, based in Grödig near Salzburg, chose the name, "Real Salzburg Mozartkugeln". Bavarian producer Reber opted for "Real Reber Mozartkugeln". In 1996, a dispute between Fürst and a subsidiary of the Swiss food producer Nestlé, which wanted to market "Original Austria Mozartkugeln", was decided in the third instance. Only Fürst's products may be called "Original Salzburg Mozartkugeln".

=== Dispute between Mirabell and Reber ===
At the end of the 1970s, another dispute arose between industrial confection producer Mirabell (today part of Mondelez International) and its competitor Reber over the Mozartkugel trademark. A provisional agreement was reached in 1981 between representatives of the Austrian and German governments, whereby only Austrian producers were to be allowed to use the label Mozartkugeln. Reber protested against this agreement, and the EC-Commissioner in Brussels charged with deciding in the affair finally declared the agreement invalid. This is why Reber may legitimately and continuously use its "Genuine Reber Mozart-Kugeln" trademark, though with a hyphen in-between.

Nonetheless, only Mirabell Mozartkugeln are allowed to be round. Other industrially produced Mozartkugeln must have one flat side. Besides Mirabell and Reber, Mozartkugeln manufacturers include Hofbauer, Vienna (part of Lindt & Sprüngli), and Manner, as well as Halloren in Germany.

== Trivia ==
The Mozartkugel won the gold medal at a fair in Paris in 1905.

In the winter of 2006, 80 oversized polyester Mozartkugeln, each with a diameter of 1.6 m (5.2 ft), were placed in the old town of Salzburg. They had been designed by artists. On the night of 27 March, vandals removed one of these Mozartkugeln from the Franziskanergasse, where it had been bolted to the ground. They then rolled it onto the street, causing damage of €7,000.
