= Gustav Tauschek =

Informatician, inventor, engineer

Gustav Tauschek (April 29, 1899, Vienna, Austria – February 14, 1945, Zürich, Switzerland) was an Austrian pioneer of Information technology and developed numerous improvements for punched card-based calculating machines from 1922 to 1945.

== Career ==
=== System Tauschek ===
From 1926 till 1930 Tauschek developed a complete punched card-based accounting system, which was never mass-produced.

The system is currently stored in the archives of the Technisches Museum Wien.

=== Magnetic drum memory ===
In 1932 Tauschek built a magnetic drum memory.

=== IBM ===
Throughout the 1930s Tauschek worked as a consultant to IBM. For IBM he built a reading-writing calculator and he constructed a range of data storage devices with magnetized steel plates. For IBM Tauschek also build a accounting machine that was capable of storing the records of 10,000 bank accounts.

== Later life and legacy ==
Gustav Tauschek died of an embolism on February 14, 1945 in a hospital in Zürich, Switzerland.
