= Wolfgang von Kempelen =

Hungarian author and inventor (1734–1804)

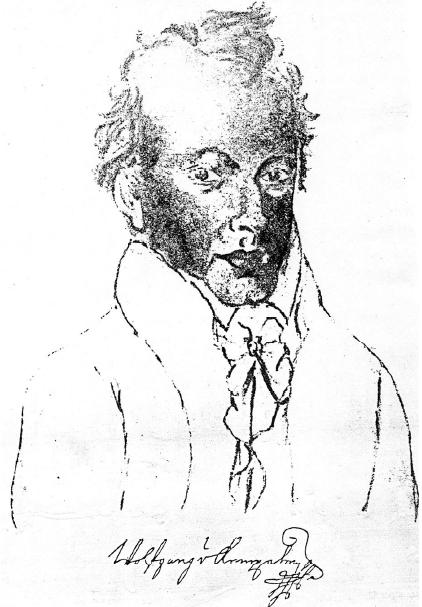
- Self-portrait
- Born: Wolfgang Franciscus de Paula Johannes Elemosinarius von Kempelen; 23 January 1734; Pozsony, Kingdom of Hungary, Habsburg Empire (now Bratislava, Slovakia)
- Died: 26 March 1804 (aged 70); Vienna, Habsburg Empire
- Occupation: Inventor
- Known for: The Turk

Johann Wolfgang von Kempelen (Hungarian: Kempelen Farkas; 23 January 1734 – 26 March 1804) was a Hungarian writer, architect, engineer and inventor, known for his chess-playing "automaton" hoax The Turk and for his speaking machine.

== Personal life ==
Von Kempelen was born in Pressburg (today's Bratislava, Slovakia), then capital city of the Kingdom of Hungary within the Habsburg Empire, the last child of Engelbert Kempelen (1680–1761), and Anna Theresa Spindler. (Note: Contrary to some accounts, he did not hold the title of Ritter or "Baron". This misconception may stem from historical confusion with one of his older brothers, Johannes Nepomuk Joseph, who attained the rank of general within the Habsburg Empire, and who was granted the title Kempelen von Pázmánd after purchasing a former Jesuit estate in Pázmánd, a village south of Budapest.)

Von Kempelen studied law and philosophy in Pressburg, and attended the Academy in Győr, Vienna and Rome, but mathematics and physics also interested him. Besides Pressburg's native tongues of German, Hungarian and Slavic von Kempelen also spoke Latin, French, Italian, and later, some English and Romanian, which he learned during his travels in England and assignments in Banat. He applied for his first position with the Habsburg Court in 1755 as a supernumary clerk in the Hungarian Court Chamber in Pressburg. Later he became a secretary (1757), a Councillor of the Court Chamber (1764), Director of Salt Mining (1765), Second Commissioner of the Constitutional Commission for the Region of Banat (1769), and finally Imperial-Royal Court Councillor (1787). During this time he also helped transfer the University of Tyrnavia to Buda Castle, and oversaw the building of the Court Theatre in Buda's former Carmelite monastery.

He married twice, first in 1757 to Maria Franziska Piani, who died suddenly in 1758 of an abdominal obstruction, and again in 1762 to Maria Anna von Gobelius, who had served as a lady's companion in the house of Count Johannes Erdődy, the vice-president of the Hungarian Court Chancery. Five children were born from his second marriage, of whom two survived into adulthood: Maria Theresia (1768–1812) and Karl (1771–1822).

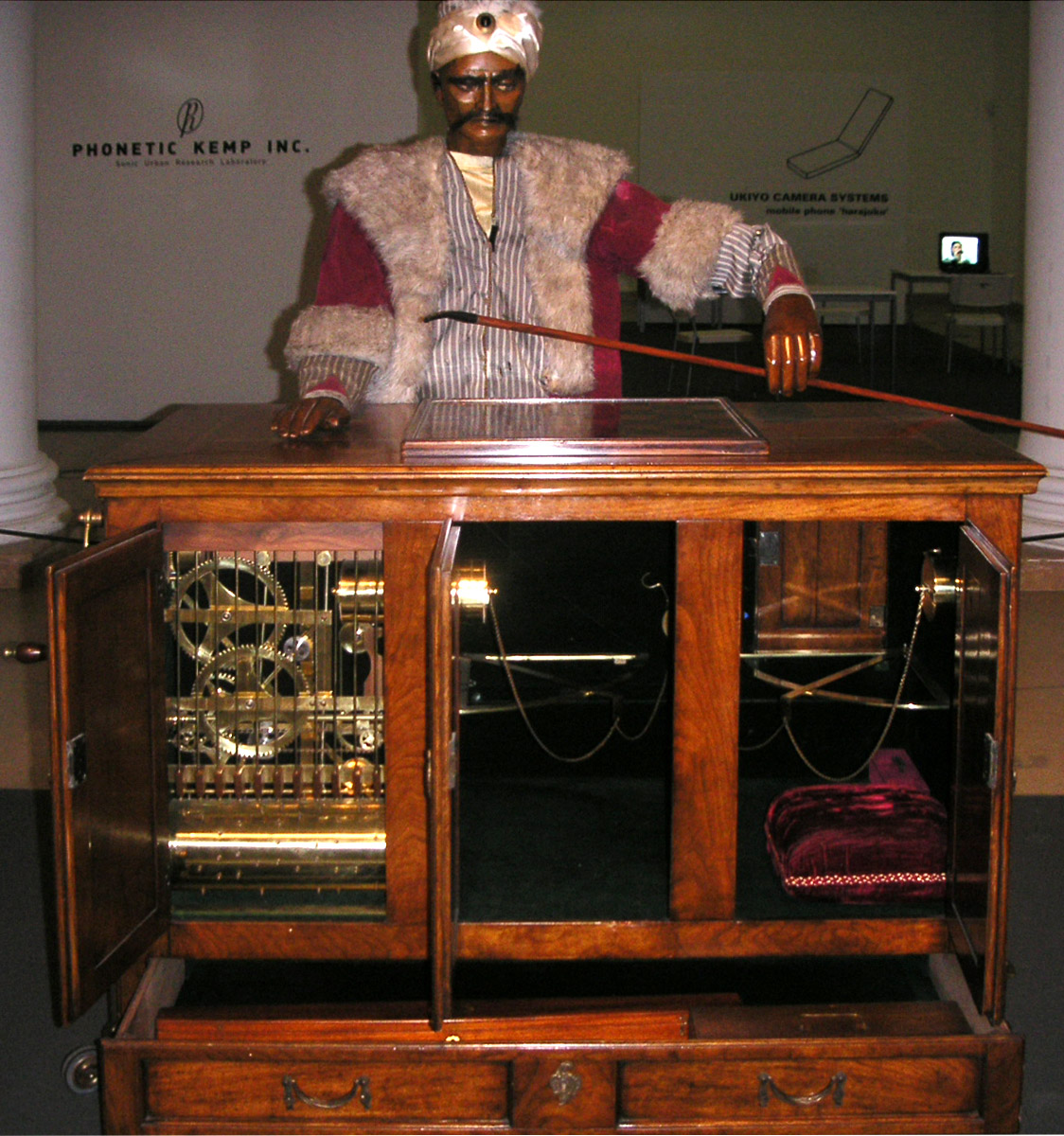
A reconstruction of The Turk

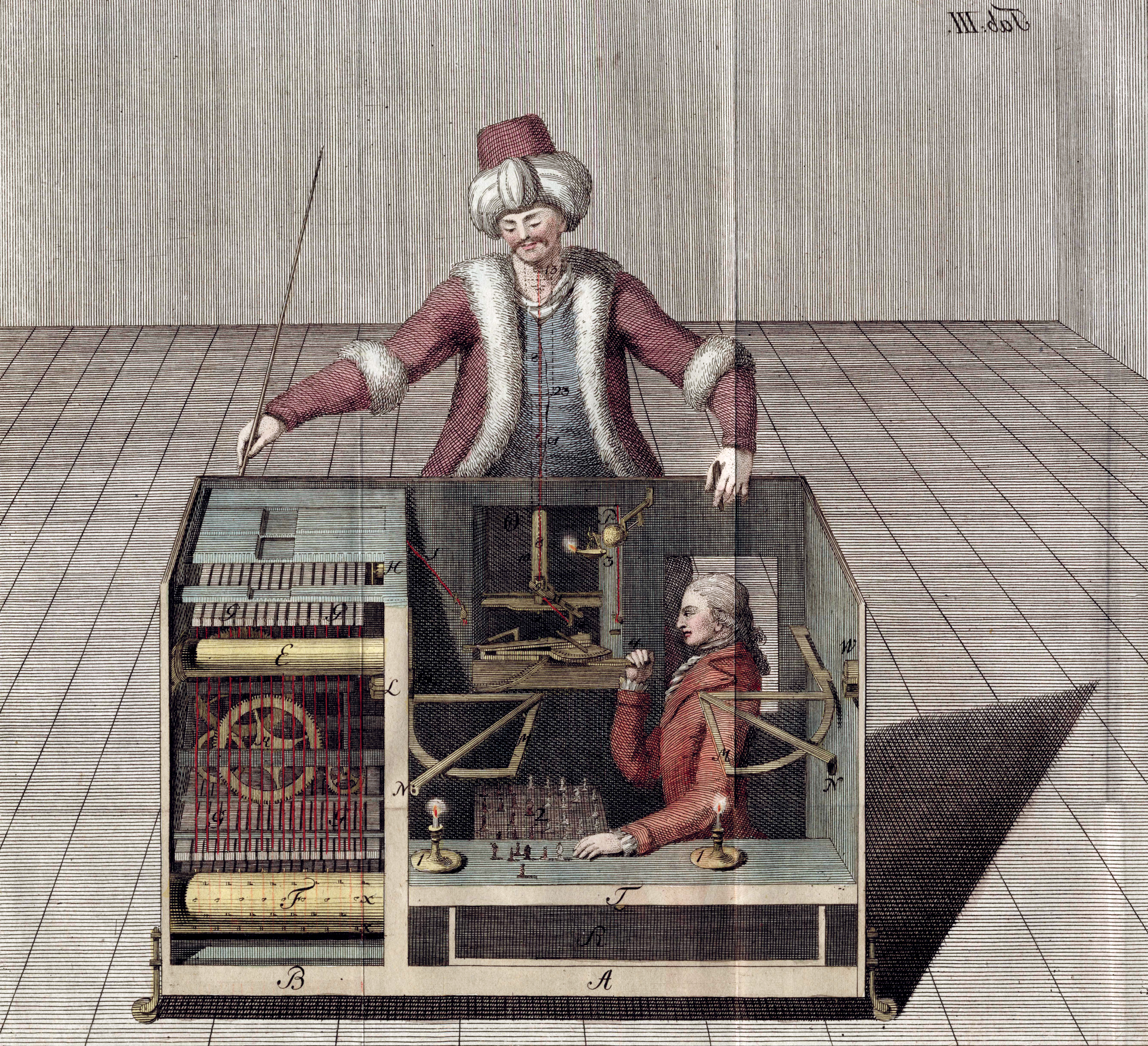
The secret interior of The Turk

== Inventions ==
Though he had a long and successful career as a civil servant, von Kempelen was most famous for his construction of The Turk, a chess-playing automaton presented to Maria Theresa of Austria in 1770. The machine consisted of a life-sized model of a human head and upper body, dressed in Turkish robes and a turban, seated behind a large cabinet on top of which a chessboard was placed. The machine appeared to be able to play a strong game of chess against a human opponent, but was in fact merely an elaborate simulation of mechanical automation: a human chess master concealed inside the cabinet puppeteered the Turk from below by means of a series of levers. With a skilled operator, the Turk won most of the games played during its demonstrations around Europe and the Americas for nearly 84 years, playing and defeating many challengers including statesmen such as Napoleon Bonaparte and Benjamin Franklin.

Kempelen also created a manually operated speaking machine. An early version (possibly an original) can still be seen in the Musical Instruments section of the Deutsches Museum in Munich. In 1789, he published a book containing his nearly twenty years of speech research, Mechanismus der menschlichen Sprache Nebst Beschreibung seiner sprechenden Maschine.

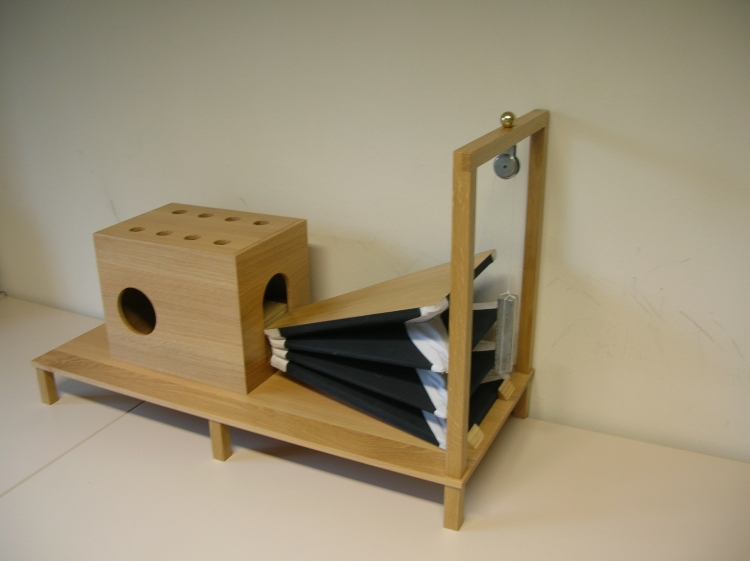
A reconstruction of Kempelen's speaking machine

He constructed steam engines, water pumps, a pontoon bridge in Pressburg (1770), patented a steam turbine for mills (1788/89) and a typewriter for Mozart's friend a blind Viennese pianist Maria Theresia von Paradis (1779), and built a theatre house in Buda (inaugurated 25 October 1790) (now Budapest) and the famous fountains at Schönbrunn in Vienna (1780). He was also a talented artist and etcher, wrote poems and epigrams, and composed a singspiel, Andromeda and Perseus, performed in Vienna.

== Retirement and death ==
He retired in 1798, after forty-three years of service to the Austrian Empire. Some sources claim he was destitute at the time of his retirement because the Emperor revoked his pension, though this conclusion is most likely a misunderstanding of his multiple pensions. In 1771, Maria Theresia honored von Kempelen with an annual pension of 1,000 ducats for his exemplary work, but after her death, her son Joseph II made drastic cuts to the benefits granted to the court's civil servants, and von Kempelen's supplementary pension was revoked in 1781. Upon his retirement, von Kempelen was granted a pension equal to his final salary of 5,000 Gulden, and in 1802, he sought to recover the income from his smaller annual pension by submitting a petition to Francis II, requesting compensation in the amount of 20,000 Gulden accrued in expenses in service to the crown, but was ultimately denied.

At the time of his death in 1804, he owned a country estate in Gomba near Pressburg, but died in his apartment on the Alsergrund, a suburb of Vienna.

The Wolfgang von Kempelen Computing Science History Prize was named in his honor, as was a high school in Budapest.

== Publications ==
- Mechanismus der menschlichen Sprache. Wolfgangs von Kempelen k. k. wirklichen Hofraths Mechanismus der menschlichen Sprache, nebst der Beschreibung seiner sprechenden Maschine; Wien 1791. (Digitized within the Oregon Health & Science University Digital Collections)
- Wolfgang von Kempelen: Der Mechanismus der menschlichen Sprache. / The Mechanism of Human Speech.: Kommentierte Transliteration & Übertragung ins Englische / Commented Transliteration & Translation into English. Herausgegeben von / Edited by Fabian Brackhane, Richard Sproat & Jürgen Trouvain; Dresden 2017 (Online version).
