= Paul Fürst =

Austrian confectioner (1856–1941)

- Born: 12 August 1856; Sierning, Austria
- Died: 14 February 1941 (aged 84); Salzburg
- Occupation: Confectioner
- Known for: Mozartkugel

Paul Fürst (12 August 1856 – 14 February 1941) was an Austrian confectioner and the inventor of the "Original Salzburger Mozartkugel".

== Biography ==
Paul Fürst was the son of Johann Fürst (1827–1868), a native of Dinkelsbühl, Germany, and Josefine Rehle (1822–1876), a native of Salzburg, Austria, daughter of a court glazier.

His father came to Salzburg in 1849 and obtained his license to practice as an obstetrician at the "Medicinal Collegium" in 1854. He practiced medicine beginning in 1853 in Sierning, Upper Austria where Paul Fürst was born.

After the death of his father, who died of typhoid fever and is buried in St. Peter's Cemetery and his mother, Paul Fürst grew up with his uncle Paul Weibhauser as his legal guardian, who live in Salzburg and owned a pastry shop at Brodgasse 13. Vinzenz Rehle, Paul's father-in-law, had acquired the traditional house, which served for a time as a "court baker's house", in 1830. Paul Fürst learned the profession of confectioner from Weibhauser and then continued his education in the leading confectioneries in the cities of Vienna, Budapest, Paris and Nice.

He married Emilie Baumgartner on 2 August 1887 and had a son, Johann Hermann Vinzenz, born on 27 March 1891.

=== Invention of the 'Mozartbonbon' ===
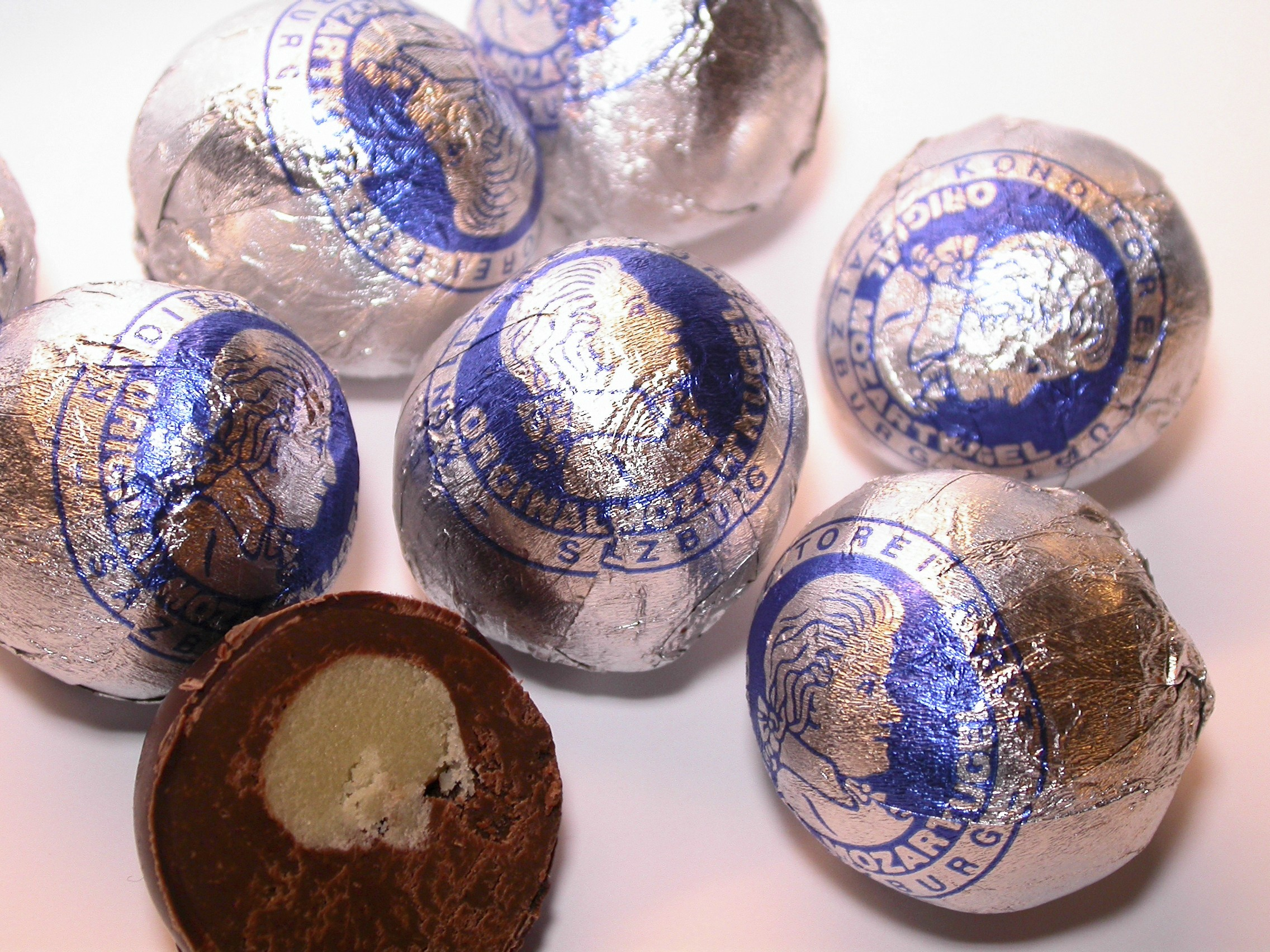
The "Original Salzburger Mozartkugeln" of the Confectionary Fürst

In 1884 he opened his own pastry shop, again at Brodgasse 13. In 1890, Paul Fürst created a praline there, consisting of pistachio-marzipan coated with nougat and dark couverture chocolate, and named it "Mozartkugel" after the composer Wolfgang Amadeus Mozart (at that time it was still called "Mozartbonbon"). His creation was awarded a gold medal at the International Trade Exhibition in Paris in 1905.

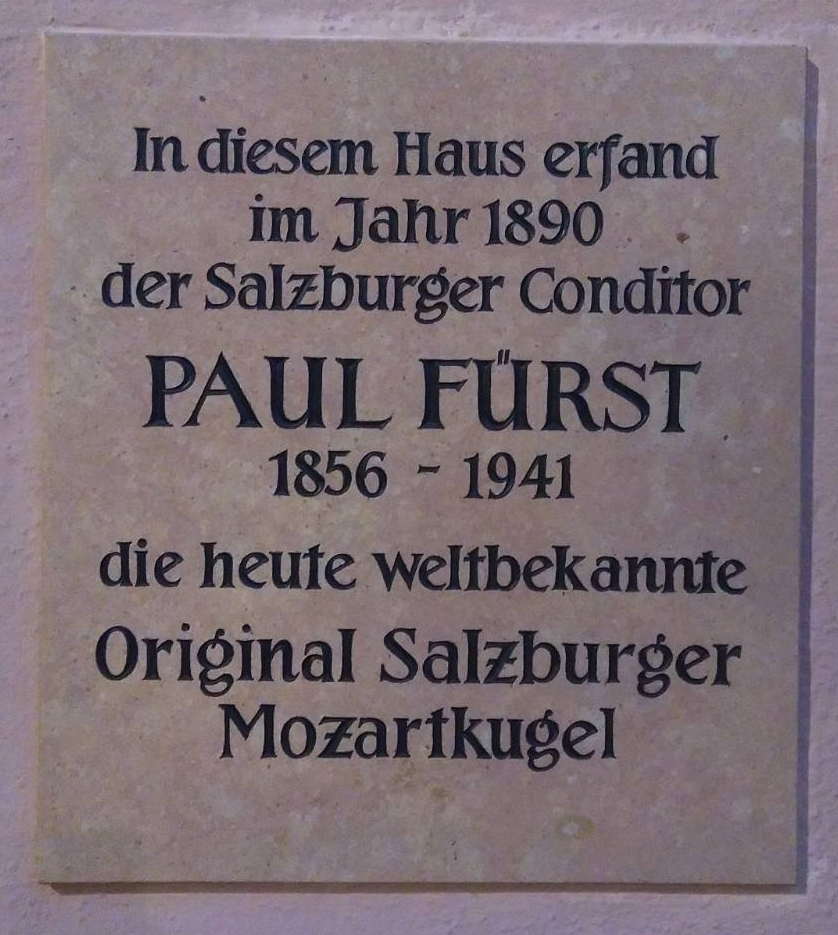
Plaque commemorating the place in which Paul Fürst invented the Mozartkugel

Soon, due to the great success, numerous knock-off products from other confectioners came onto the market. Since Paul Fürst did not patent his invention, the name "Mozartkugel" is not legally protected on its own. The term "Original Salzburger Mozartkugel" is protected today after a court ruled in the case.

The confectionery Fürst, which is still family-owned, handmakes the Mozartkugeln according to the traditional recipe and with the original manufacturing method and sold only at its four locations in Salzburg (as well as by mail), while the imitation products are usually industrially produced and traded in large quantities.

After his death on February 14, 1941, Paul Fürst was buried in the Salzburg Municipal Cemetery. In the family crypt at St. Peter's Cemetery, a memorial plaque commemorates him.
