= Hematologic disease =

Disorders of the blood and related organs

- Specialty: Hematology

Hematologic diseases are disorders which primarily affect the blood and blood-forming organs. Hematologic diseases include rare genetic disorders, anemia, HIV, sickle cell disease and complications from chemotherapy or transfusions.

== Myeloid ==
- Hemoglobinopathies (congenital abnormality of the hemoglobin molecule or of the rate of hemoglobin synthesis)
  - Sickle cell disease
  - Thalassemia
  - Methemoglobinemia
- Anemias (lack of red blood cells or hemoglobin)
  - Iron-deficiency anemia
  - Megaloblastic anemia
    - Vitamin B_{12} deficiency
      - Pernicious anemia
    - Folate deficiency
  - Hemolytic anemias (destruction of red blood cells)
    - Genetic disorders of RBC membrane
      - Hereditary spherocytosis
      - Hereditary elliptocytosis
      - Congenital dyserythropoietic anemia
    - Genetic disorders of RBC metabolism
      - Glucose-6-phosphate dehydrogenase deficiency (G6PD)
      - Pyruvate kinase deficiency
    - Immune mediated hemolytic anemia (direct Coombs test is positive)
      - Autoimmune hemolytic anemia
        - Warm antibody autoimmune hemolytic anemia
          - Idiopathic
          - Systemic lupus erythematosus (SLE)
          - Evans syndrome (antiplatelet antibodies and hemolytic antibodies)
        - Cold autoimmune hemolytic anemia
          - Cold agglutinin disease
          - Paroxysmal cold hemoglobinuria (rare)
          - Infectious mononucleosis
      - Alloimmune hemolytic anemia
        - Hemolytic disease of the newborn (HDN)
          - Rh disease (Rh D)
          - ABO hemolytic disease of the newborn
          - Anti-Kell hemolytic disease of the newborn
          - Rhesus c hemolytic disease of the newborn
          - Rhesus E hemolytic disease of the newborn
          - Other blood group incompatibility (RhC, Rhe, Kid, Duffy, MN, P and others)
      - Drug induced immune mediated hemolytic anemia
        - Penicillin (high dose)
        - Methyldopa
    - Hemoglobinopathies (where these is an unstable or crystalline hemoglobin)
    - Paroxysmal nocturnal hemoglobinuria (rare acquired clonal disorder of red blood cell surface proteins)
    - Direct physical damage to RBCs
      - Microangiopathic hemolytic anemia
      - Secondary to artificial heart valve(s)
  - Aplastic anemia
    - Fanconi anemia
    - Diamond–Blackfan anemia (inherited pure red cell aplasia)
    - Acquired pure red cell aplasia
- Decreased numbers of cells
  - Myelodysplastic syndrome
  - Myelofibrosis
  - Neutropenia (decrease in the number of neutrophils)
  - Agranulocytosis
  - Glanzmann's thrombasthenia
  - Thrombocytopenia (decrease in the number of platelets)
    - Idiopathic thrombocytopenic purpura (ITP)
    - Thrombotic thrombocytopenic purpura (TTP)
    - Heparin-induced thrombocytopenia (HIT)
- Myeloproliferative disorders (Increased numbers of cells)
  - Polycythemia vera (increase in the number of cells in general)
  - Erythrocytosis (increase in the number of red blood cells)
  - Leukocytosis (increase in the number of white blood cells)
  - Thrombocytosis (increase in the number of platelets)
  - Myeloproliferative disorder
  - Transient myeloproliferative disease
- Coagulopathies (disorders of bleeding and coagulation)
  - Thrombocytosis
  - Recurrent thrombosis
  - Disseminated intravascular coagulation
  - Disorders of clotting proteins
    - Hemophilia
      - Hemophilia A
      - Hemophilia B (also known as Christmas disease)
      - Hemophilia C
    - Von Willebrand disease
    - Disseminated intravascular coagulation
    - Protein S deficiency
    - Antiphospholipid syndrome
  - Disorders of platelets
    - Thrombocytopenia
    - Glanzmann's thrombasthenia
    - Wiskott–Aldrich syndrome

== Hematological malignancies ==
- Hematological malignancies
  - Lymphomas
    - Hodgkin's disease
    - Non-Hodgkin's lymphoma {includes the next five entries}
      - Burkitt's lymphoma
      - Anaplastic large cell lymphoma
      - Splenic marginal zone lymphoma
      - Hepatosplenic T-cell lymphoma
      - Angioimmunoblastic T-cell lymphoma (AILT)
  - Myelomas
    - Multiple myeloma
    - Waldenström macroglobulinemia
    - Plasmacytoma
  - Leukemias increased WBC
    - Acute lymphocytic leukemia (ALL)
    - Chronic lymphocytic leukemia (CLL){now included in theCLL/SCLL type NHL}
    - Acute myelogenous leukemia (AML)
    - Acute megakaryoblastic leukemia (AMKL), a sub-type of acute myelogenous leukemia
    - Chronic Idiopathic Myelofibrosis (MF)
    - Chronic myelogenous leukemia (CML)
    - T-cell prolymphocytic leukemia (T-PLL)
    - B-cell prolymphocytic leukemia (B-PLL)
    - Chronic neutrophilic leukemia (CNL)
    - Hairy cell leukemia (HCL)
    - T-cell large granular lymphocyte leukemia (T-LGL)
    - Aggressive NK-cell leukemia

== Miscellaneous ==
- Hemochromatosis
- Asplenia
- Hypersplenism
  - Gaucher's disease
- Monoclonal gammopathy of undetermined significance
- Hemophagocytic lymphohistiocytosis
- Tempi syndrome

== Hematological changes secondary to non-hematological disorders ==
- Anemia of chronic disease
- Infectious mononucleosis
- AIDS
- Malaria
- Leishmaniasis
