= Acquired hemolytic anemia =

- Specialty: Hematology

Acquired hemolytic anemia can be divided into immune and non-immune mediated forms of hemolytic anemia.

== Classification ==
=== Immune ===
- Autoimmune hemolytic anemia
  - Warm antibody autoimmune hemolytic anemia
    - Idiopathic
    - Linked with primary immunodeficiency/immunodysregulation syndrome.
    - Lymphoma or chronic lymphocytic leukemia associated.
    - Secondary to other malignancies.
    - Associated with SLE or other collagen-vascular disorders.
    - Secondary to viral infection.
  - Cold antibody autoimmune hemolytic anemia
  - Paroxysmal cold hemoglobinuria
  - Drug-induced autoimmune hemolytic anemia
- Alloimmune hemolytic anemia
  - Hemolytic disease of the newborn (HDN)
    - Rh disease (Rh D)
    - ABO hemolytic disease of the newborn
    - Anti-Kell hemolytic disease of the newborn
    - Rhesus c hemolytic disease of the newborn
    - Rhesus E hemolytic disease of the newborn
    - Other blood group incompatibility (RhC, Rhe, Kidd, Duffy, MN, P and others)
  - Alloimmune hemolytic blood transfusion reactions (i.e., from a non-compatible blood type)

=== Non-immune ===
- Traumatic hemolytic anemia
  - Impact
  - Macrovascular defects-prostheses
  - Microvascular causes
    - Disseminated intravascular hemolysis
    - Thrombotic thrombocytopenic purpura
    - Typical and atypical hemolytic uremic syndrome
    - Other microvascular abnormalities
  - Hypersplenism
  - Hemolytic anemia due to toxic effects on the membrane
    - Spur cell anemia
    - External toxins
      - Animal or spider bites
      - Metals
      - Organic compounds
    - Infectious agents
- Paroxysmal nocturnal hemoglobinuria (PNH)

== History ==
The term 'acquired hemolytic anemia' originally appeared in the early 1900s.
