= Hemolytic disease of the newborn (anti-Rhc) =

HDN due to anti-Rhc alloimmunization
- Specialty: Hematology

Hemolytic disease of the newborn (anti-Rhc) is a form of hemolytic disease of the fetus and newborn (HDN) caused by maternal IgG antibodies directed against the Rhc red blood cell (RBC) antigen. The condition results from maternal alloimmunization to fetal Rhc-positive red cells, leading to fetal or neonatal hemolysis, anemia, and hyperbilirubinemia. Disease severity ranges from mild to severe, and complications can include kernicterus, neutropenia, and thrombocytopenia.

The Rhc ("little c") antigen is implicated in only about 7 in 10,000 pregnancies, but roughly 20–30% of affected infants develop severe disease, making anti-Rhc the second most common cause of severe HDN. Diagnosis relies on serological testing of the parents and, where indicated, fetal antigen typing and middle cerebral artery Doppler assessment. Management may involve intrauterine transfusion (IUT), intravenous immunoglobulin (IVIG), plasmapheresis, early delivery, and postnatal phototherapy or exchange transfusion.

== Signs and symptoms ==
Affected fetuses and newborns may present with anemia, hyperbilirubinemia, and, in severe cases, hydrops fetalis. Clinical and laboratory findings can include any of the manifestations listed below.

=== Complications ===
- High or rapidly rising bilirubin at birth
- Prolonged hyperbilirubinemia
- Bilirubin-induced neurological dysfunction
- Cerebral palsy
- Kernicterus
- Neutropenia
- Thrombocytopenia
- Hemolytic anemia (which should not be treated with iron supplementation)
- Late-onset anemia, which should not be treated with iron and may persist for up to 12 weeks after birth

==== Transfusion reactions ====
Once a woman has developed alloantibodies, she is at increased risk of a hemolytic transfusion reaction. She is therefore generally advised to carry a medical alert card and to inform treating clinicians of her antibody status.

Acute hemolytic transfusion reactions can be either immune-mediated or nonimmune-mediated. Immune-mediated reactions caused by immunoglobulin M (IgM) anti-A, anti-B, or anti-A,B antibodies typically produce severe, potentially fatal, complement-mediated intravascular hemolysis. By contrast, immune-mediated reactions caused by IgG antibodies against Rh, Kell, Duffy, or other non-ABO antigens generally result in extravascular red cell sequestration, shortened survival of transfused cells, and milder clinical effects. Such reactions can occur even when antibodies are not detected by routine laboratory testing.

== Causes ==
A Rhc-negative mother can become sensitized to red blood cell Rhc antigens during a first pregnancy with a Rhc-positive fetus or as a result of blood transfusion. The mother may then produce IgG anti-Rhc antibodies, which can cross the placenta into the fetal circulation. If the fetus is Rhc-positive, alloimmune hemolysis may result, producing HDN.

== Diagnosis ==
Evaluation for HDN includes blood testing of both parents and may also involve amniocentesis and middle cerebral artery (MCA) Doppler assessment.

In anti-C and anti-c HDN, the direct antiglobulin test (DAT) may be negative even when the infant is severely affected. An indirect Coombs test is therefore also performed.

In women with anti-c, repeat antibody screening at around 28 weeks is suggested to detect possible co-development of anti-E.

=== Maternal testing ===
Antibody screening in the mother is performed using the indirect Coombs test (also called the indirect agglutination test, IAT), which detects circulating antibodies in maternal plasma. If a clinically relevant antibody is identified, its titer is determined. Critical titers are associated with significant risk of fetal anemia and hydrops fetalis. A titer of 1:8 or higher is considered critical for Kell, and 1:16 or higher for most other antibodies. Once a critical titer is reached, ongoing care is generally guided by MCA Doppler studies. A sudden rise in titer late in pregnancy, or a fourfold increase in titer, is regarded as significant regardless of whether the critical threshold has been crossed. After a previously affected pregnancy, maternal titers are not reliable predictors of fetal anemia and should not be used to direct management. Titers are generally checked monthly until 24 weeks and every two weeks thereafter.

Two situations call for monitoring that differs from standard Rh(D) management. In alloimmunization to the C, c, or E antigens, hemolysis has been reported at titers below 1:16, so MCA Doppler assessment may be reasonable if a stable low titer rises later in pregnancy. In Kell isoimmunization, severe fetal hemolysis can occur even at low titers, so antibody titers alone are not adequate for risk assessment.

When the indirect Coombs test is positive, the woman is generally advised to carry a medical alert card or bracelet long-term because of the ongoing risk of a hemolytic transfusion reaction.

=== Paternal testing ===
The father is generally tested to help establish the likely fetal antigen status. If he is homozygous for the antigen, every offspring of the couple will be antigen-positive and at risk for HDN; if he is heterozygous, each pregnancy carries a 50% chance of an antigen-positive fetus. The result informs management of the current pregnancy and counseling about future pregnancies. For Rh(D), this test is termed the RhD genotype; for RhCE and Kell, it is referred to as antigen phenotyping.

=== Fetal assessment ===
Fetal antigen status can be determined by analysis of cell-free fetal DNA, by amniocentesis, or by chorionic villus sampling (CVS); CVS is generally avoided because it can increase fetomaternal hemorrhage and exacerbate maternal alloimmunization.

Cell-free fetal DNA testing is performed on a maternal blood sample using polymerase chain reaction (PCR) to detect K, C, c, D, and E alleles in fetal DNA. The technique is non-invasive, accurate, and used routinely in the United Kingdom at the International Blood Group Reference Laboratory in Bristol; testing is also offered by Sanquin in Amsterdam, Netherlands. In the United States, fetal D status testing is provided commercially as SensiGene™ by Sequenom Laboratories.

Amniocentesis can determine fetal antigen status as early as 15 weeks via PCR of fetal cells. CVS is technically able to determine fetal antigen status but is generally not recommended because of the increased risk of fetomaternal hemorrhage and worsening of antibody titers.

Middle cerebral artery (MCA) Doppler peak systolic velocity (PSV) measurement can be used to monitor for fetal anemia and informs the management of alloimmunized pregnancies. The technique is non-invasive and uses ultrasound to measure peak velocity in the middle cerebral artery, which is then expressed as a multiple of the median (MoM) for gestational age. A MoM of 1.5 or greater is suggestive of severe fetal anemia and is generally an indication for intrauterine transfusion.

=== Postnatal testing ===
After delivery, several tests are performed on cord blood to characterize the disease and guide management.

A direct Coombs test is used to confirm antibody binding to the infant's red blood cells. A negative direct test does not exclude HDN, and severe disease has been documented despite a negative result. An indirect Coombs test should be performed in cases of suspected anti-C, anti-c, or anti-M alloimmunization; in anti-M HDN, antigen testing is also recommended.

Other recommended tests include:

- Cord blood hemoglobin.
- Reticulocyte count, which is elevated when the infant is producing additional red cells in response to anemia and which can suggest that further transfusion may not be needed. A low reticulocyte count may be seen after intrauterine transfusion and in HDN due to anti-Kell.
- Neutrophil count, since neutropenia is a recognized complication.
- Platelet count, since thrombocytopenia is also a recognized complication.
- Cord blood bilirubin.
- Ferritin, which should be checked before iron supplementation, as most infants with HDN are iron-overloaded.

Transfusion with donor blood during pregnancy or shortly after birth can affect the results of newborn screening tests.

== Prevention ==
In principle, IgG anti-Rhc immunoglobulin could be used to prevent maternal sensitization to Rhc, analogous to the use of Rho(D) immune globulin in the prevention of Rh disease, but no such product is currently available.

== Treatment ==
Several interventions are available before birth, depending on gestational age, and additional treatments may be required postnatally.

=== Antenatal management ===
==== Early pregnancy ====
Intravenous immunoglobulin (IVIG) is used in selected cases, including previous fetal loss, high maternal antibody titers, particularly aggressive antibodies, and situations in which religious or other considerations preclude transfusion. IVIG can be more effective than intrauterine transfusion (IUT) alone; one report described a 36% lower fetal mortality in pregnancies treated with both IVIG and IUT than with IUT alone. The combination of IVIG with plasmapheresis can reduce or eliminate the need for IUT.

Plasmapheresis aims to lower the maternal antibody titer through direct plasma exchange. The combination of plasmapheresis and IVIG has been used in women whose previous pregnancies have ended in hydrops fetalis or perinatal loss.

==== Mid to late pregnancy ====
Intrauterine transfusion (IUT) can be performed via the intraperitoneal (IPT) or intravenous (IVT) route, with IVT generally preferred. IUT is typically performed only up to about 35 weeks of gestation, after which the procedural risks generally outweigh those of postnatal transfusion.

Corticosteroids may be administered to the mother before IUT or anticipated early delivery to promote fetal lung maturation, and phenobarbital is sometimes used to enhance fetal hepatic maturation and reduce neonatal hyperbilirubinemia. Delivery may be planned at any time after the age of viability if circumstances require, including emergency delivery for failed IUT or induction at 35–38 weeks for ongoing severe disease.

=== Postnatal management ===
Phototherapy is generally indicated for cord bilirubin levels of 3 mg/dL or higher, although some clinicians initiate it at lower thresholds while awaiting laboratory results.

IVIG has been used to treat HDN due to a range of antibodies, including anti-D and anti-E, and can reduce the need for exchange transfusion and shorten the duration of phototherapy. The American Academy of Pediatrics recommends intravenous immunoglobulin (0.5–1 g/kg over two hours) in isoimmune hemolytic disease when the total serum bilirubin is rising despite intensive phototherapy or is within 2–3 mg/dL of the exchange transfusion threshold, with the dose repeated at 12 hours if necessary.

Exchange transfusion is indicated when bilirubin reaches the high- or medium-risk thresholds defined in the American Academy of Pediatrics nomogram, or when cord bilirubin exceeds 4 mg/dL.

== Epidemiology ==
The Rhc antigen is implicated in only about 7 in 10,000 pregnancies, but anti-Rhc accounts for an unusually high proportion of severe disease and is the second most common cause of severe HDN. Hemolytic disease of the fetus and newborn more generally arises when the maternal immune system becomes sensitized to red cell surface antigens; the most common sensitizing events are blood transfusion and fetomaternal hemorrhage.

== History ==
The widespread adoption of Rh(D) immunoprophylaxis (Rho(D) immune globulin, commonly known by the trade name Rhogam) has produced a substantial decline in the incidence of anti-D HDN, with the result that other red cell alloantibodies, including anti-Rhc, have become proportionally more important causes of HDN.

== See also ==
- Hemolytic anemia
- Hemolytic disease of the newborn
- Rh blood group system
