= Robin Coombs =

British immunologist (1921–2006)

Robin Coombs FRS FRCPath FRCP
- Robin Coombs
- Born: 9 January 1921; London, England
- Died: 25 January 2006 (aged 85); Cambridge, England
- Education: University of Edinburgh; King's College, Cambridge
- Known for: Coombs test; Gell–Coombs classification
- Awards: Gairdner Foundation International Award (1965)
- Scientific career
- Fields: Immunology
- Workplaces: Corpus Christi College, Cambridge

Robert Royston Amos Coombs (9 January 1921 – 25 January 2006) was a British immunologist, co-discoverer of the Coombs test (1945) used for detecting antibodies in various clinical scenarios, such as Rh disease and blood transfusion.

== Biography ==
He was born in London but attended Diocesan College in Cape Town. Subsequently he returned to Britain and studied veterinary medicine at the University of Edinburgh. In 1943 he entered King's College, Cambridge, where he commenced work on a doctorate, which he gained in 1947. Before finishing his doctorate, he developed and published methods to detect antibodies with Arthur Mourant and Robert Russell Race in 1945. This is the test now referred to as the Coombs test, which, according to the legend, was first devised while Coombs was travelling on the train.

Coombs became a professor and researcher at the Department of Pathology of University of Cambridge, becoming a Fellow of Corpus Christi College, and a founder of its Division of Immunology. He was appointed the fourth Quick Professor of Biology in 1966 and continued to work at Cambridge University until 1988. He is reported to have said that "[r]ed blood cells were primarily designed by God as tools for the immunologist and only secondarily as carriers of haemoglobin".

In November 1956, Coombs founded the British Society for Immunology alongside John H. Humphrey, Bob White, and Avrion Mitchison. He was an honorary member of the British Society for Immunology.

He received honorary doctoral degrees by the University of Guelph in Canada, and the University of Edinburgh and was a Fellow of the Royal Society of the United Kingdom (1965), a Fellow of the Royal College of Pathologists and an Honorary Fellow of the Royal College of Physicians.

Coombs was married to Anne Blomfield, his first graduate student. They had a son and a daughter.

== Works ==
The Coombs test, which he developed and published together with Arthur Mourant and Robert Russell Race in 1945, has formed the base of a large number of laboratory investigations in the fields of hematology and immunology.

Together with Professor Philip George Howthern Gell, he developed a classification of immune mechanisms of tissue injury, now known as the "Gell–Coombs classification", comprising four types of reactions.

Together with W.E. Parish and A.F. Wells he put forward an explanation of sudden infant death syndrome (SIDS) as an anaphylactic reaction to dairy proteins.

== Awards ==
Coombs was awarded the James Spence Gold Medal, Royal College of Paediatrics and Child Health in 1967 for developing the Coombs test.
