= Coombs test =

Blood test used in immunohematology

- MeSH: D003298
- MedlinePlus: 003344

The direct and indirect Coombs tests, also known as antiglobulin test (AGT), are blood tests used in immunohematology. The direct Coombs test detects antibodies that are stuck to the surface of the red blood cells. Since these antibodies sometimes destroy red blood cells they can cause anemia; this test can help clarify the condition. The indirect Coombs test detects antibodies that are floating freely in the blood. These antibodies could act against certain red blood cells; the test can be carried out to diagnose reactions to a blood transfusion.

The direct Coombs test is used to test for autoimmune hemolytic anemia, a condition where the immune system breaks down red blood cells, leading to anemia. It detects antibodies or complement proteins attached to the surface of red blood cells. To perform the test, a blood sample is taken and the red blood cells are washed (removing the patient's plasma and unbound antibodies from the red blood cells) and then incubated with anti-human globulin ("Coombs reagent"). If the red cells then agglutinate, the test is positive, a visual indication that antibodies or complement proteins are bound to the surface of red blood cells and may be causing destruction of those cells.

The indirect Coombs test is used in prenatal testing of pregnant women and in testing prior to a blood transfusion. The test detects antibodies against foreign red blood cells. In this case, serum is extracted from a blood sample taken from the patient. The serum is incubated with foreign red blood cells of known antigenicity. Finally, anti-human globulin is added. If agglutination occurs, the indirect Coombs test is positive.

== Mechanism ==
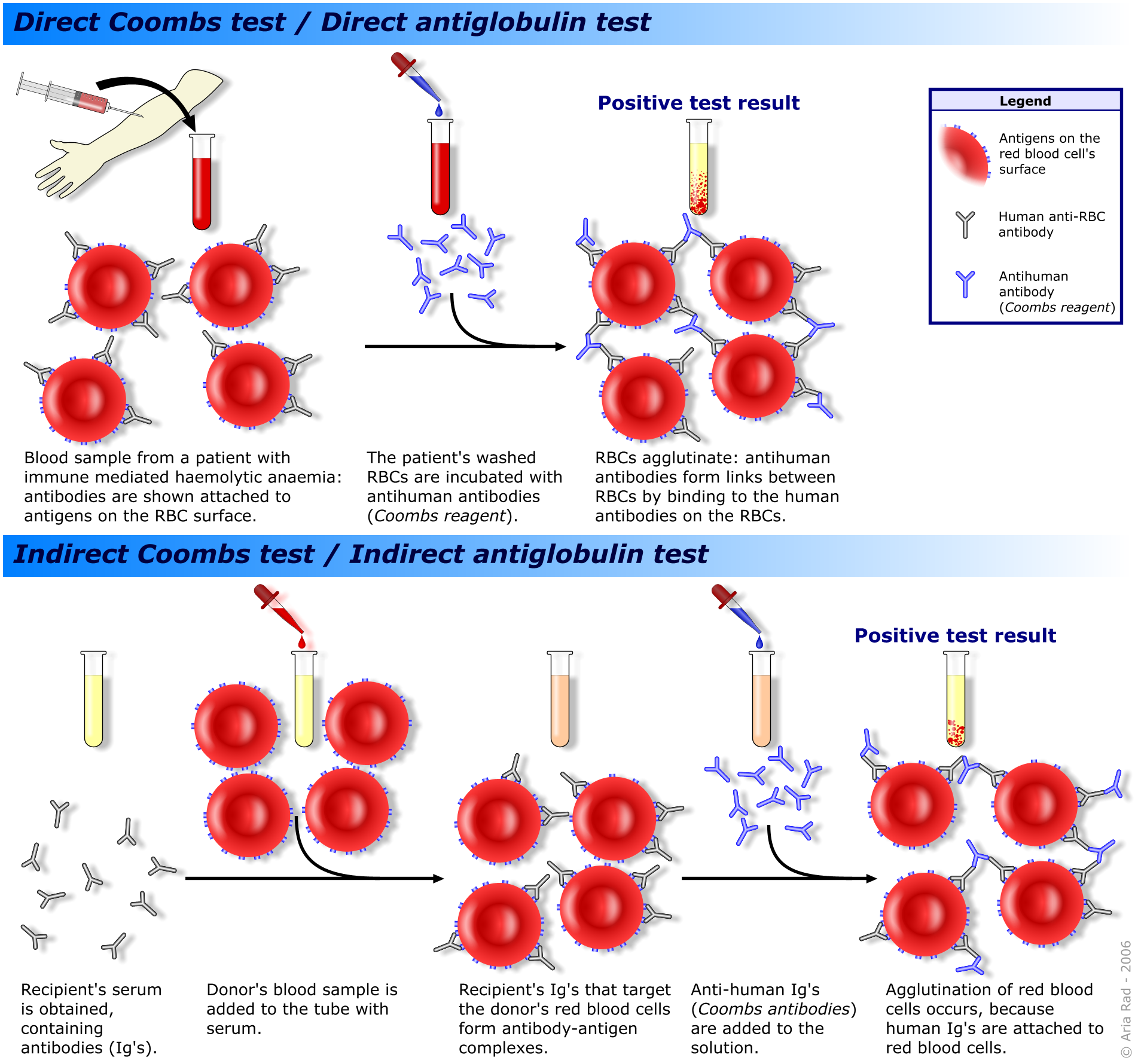
Schematic showing the direct and indirect Coombs tests

The two Coombs tests are based on anti-human antibodies binding to human antibodies, commonly IgG or IgM. These anti-human antibodies are produced by plasma cells of non-human animals after immunizing them with human plasma. Additionally, these anti-human antibodies will also bind to human antibodies that may be fixed onto antigens on the surface of red blood cells (RBCs). In the appropriate test tube conditions, this can lead to agglutination of RBCs and allowing for visualisation of the resulting clumps of RBCs. If clumping is seen, the Coombs test is positive; if not, the Coombs test is negative.

Common clinical uses of the Coombs test include the preparation of blood for transfusion in cross-matching, atypical antibodies in the blood plasma of pregnant women as part of antenatal care, and detection of antibodies for the diagnosis of immune-mediated hemolytic anemias.

Coombs tests are performed using RBCs or serum (direct or indirect, respectively) from venous whole blood samples which are taken from patients by venipuncture. The venous blood is taken to a laboratory (or blood bank), where trained scientific technical staff do the Coombs tests. The clinical significance of the result is assessed by the physician who requested the Coombs test, perhaps with assistance from a laboratory-based hematologist.

== Direct Coombs test ==
The direct Coombs test, also referred to as the direct antiglobulin test (DAT), is used to detect if antibodies or complement system factors have bound to RBCs surface antigens. The DAT is not required for pre-transfusion testing but may be carried out by some laboratories. Before transfusion, an indirect Coombs test is often done.

=== Uses ===
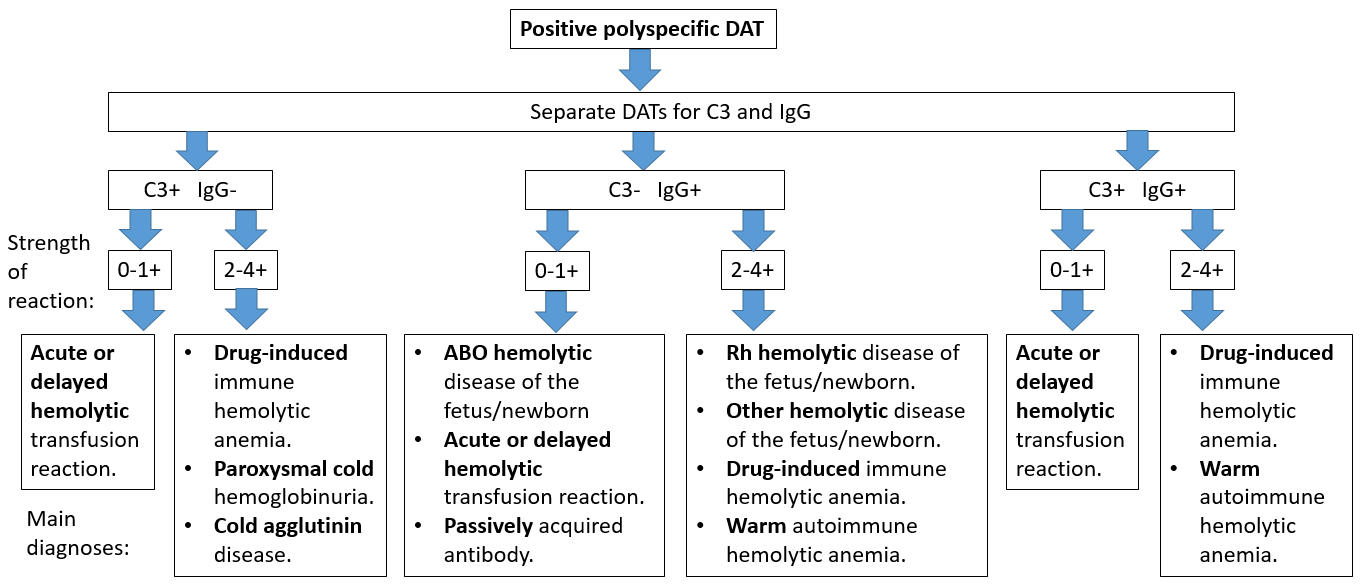
Algorithm for the main diagnoses in a positive DAT

The direct Coombs test is used clinically when immune-mediated hemolytic anemia (antibody-mediated destruction of RBCs) is suspected. A positive Coombs test indicates that an immune mechanism is attacking the patient's RBCs. This mechanism could be autoimmunity, alloimmunity or a drug-induced immune-mediated mechanism.

==== Examples of alloimmune hemolysis ====
- Hemolytic disease of the newborn (also known as HDN or erythroblastosis fetalis)
  - Rh D hemolytic disease of the newborn (also known as Rh disease)
  - ABO hemolytic disease of the newborn (the direct Coombs test may only be weakly positive)
  - Anti-Kell hemolytic disease of the newborn
  - Rh c hemolytic disease of the newborn
  - Rh E hemolytic disease of the newborn
  - Other blood group incompatibility (RhC, Rhe, Kidd, Duffy, Lewis, MN, P and others)
- Alloimmune hemolytic transfusion reactions

==== Examples of autoimmune hemolysis/immunohemolytic hemolysis ====
- Warm antibody autoimmune hemolytic anemia
  - Idiopathic
  - Systemic lupus erythematosus
  - Evans' syndrome (antiplatelet antibodies and hemolytic antibodies)
- Cold antibody immunohemolytic anemia
  - Idiopathic cold hemagglutinin syndrome
  - Waldenström's macroglobulinemia
  - Infectious mononucleosis
  - Paroxysmal cold hemoglobinuria (rare)

==== Drug-induced immune-mediated hemolysis ====
- Methyldopa (IgG mediated type II hypersensitivity)
- Penicillin (high dose)
- Quinidine (IgM mediated activation of classical complement pathway and Membrane attack complex, MAC)

(A memory device to remember that the DAT tests the RBCs and is used to test infants for haemolytic disease of the newborn is: Rh Disease; R = RBCs, D = DAT.)

=== Laboratory ===
The patient's RBCs are washed (removing the patient's own serum) and then centrifuged with antihuman globulin (also known as Coombs reagent). If immunoglobulin or complement factors have been fixed on to the RBC surface in-vitro, the antihuman globulin will agglutinate the RBCs and the direct Coombs test will be positive. (A visual representation of a positive direct Coombs test is shown in the upper half of the schematic).

== Indirect Coombs test ==
The indirect Coombs test, also referred to as the indirect antiglobulin test (IAT), is used to detect in-vitro antibody-antigen reactions. It is used to detect very low concentrations of antibodies present in a patient's plasma/serum prior to a blood transfusion. In antenatal care, the IAT is used to screen pregnant women for antibodies that may cause hemolytic disease of the newborn. The IAT can also be used for compatibility testing, antibody identification, RBC phenotyping, and titration studies.

=== Uses ===
==== Blood transfusion preparation ====
The indirect Coombs test is used to screen for antibodies in the preparation of blood for blood transfusion. The donor's and recipient's blood must be ABO and Rh D compatible. Donor blood for transfusion is also screened for infections in separate processes.

- Antibody screening

A blood sample from the recipient and a blood sample from every unit of donor blood are screened for antibodies with the indirect Coombs test. Each sample is incubated against a wide range of RBCs that together exhibit a full range of surface antigens (i.e. blood types).

- Cross matching

The indirect Coombs test is used to test a sample of the recipient's serum for antibodies against a sample of the blood donor's RBCs. This is sometimes called cross-matching blood.

==== Antenatal antibody screening ====
The indirect Coombs test is used to screen pregnant women for IgG antibodies that are likely to pass through the placenta into the fetal blood and cause haemolytic disease of the newborn.

=== Laboratory method ===
The IAT is a two-stage test. (A cross match is shown visually in the lower half of the schematic as an example of an indirect Coombs test).

==== First stage ====
Nonpatient, washed red blood cells (RBCs) with known antigens are incubated with patient serum containing unknown antibody content. If the serum contains antibodies to antigens on the RBC surface, the antibodies will bind to the surface of the RBCs.

==== Second stage ====
The RBCs are washed three or four times with isotonic saline solution and then incubated with antihuman globulin. If antibodies have bound to RBC surface antigens in the first stage, RBCs will agglutinate when incubated with the antihuman globulin (also known Coombs reagent) in this stage, and the indirect Coombs test will be positive.

==== Titrations ====
By diluting a serum containing antibodies the quantity of the antibody in the serum can be gauged. This is done by performing serial dilutions of the serum and finding the maximum dilution of test serum that is able to produce agglutination of relevant RBCs.

== Coombs reagent ==
Coombs reagent (also known as Coombs antiglobulin or antihuman globulin) is used in both the direct Coombs test and the indirect Coombs test. Its production involves injecting human globulin into animals, which then produce polyclonal antibodies specific for human immunoglobulins and human complement system factors. More specific Coombs reagents or monoclonal antibodies can be used.

== Enhancement media ==
Both IgM and IgG antibodies bind strongly with their complementary antigens. IgG antibodies are most reactive at 37 °C. IgM antibodies are easily detected in saline at room temperature as IgM antibodies are able to bridge between RBC's owing to their large size, efficiently creating what is seen as agglutination. IgG antibodies are smaller and require assistance to bridge well enough to form a visual agglutination reaction. Reagents used to enhance IgG detection are referred to as potentiators. RBCs have a net negative charge called zeta potential which causes them to have a natural repulsion for one another. Potentiators reduce the zeta potential of RBC membranes. Common potentiators include low ionic strength solution (LISS), albumin, polyethylene glycol (PEG), and proteolytic enzymes.

== History ==
The Coombs test was first described in 1945 by Cambridge immunologists Robin Coombs (after whom it is named), Arthur Mourant and Rob Race. Historically, it was done in test tubes. Today, it is commonly done using automated solid phase or gel technology.
