= James Harrison (blood donor) =

Australian blood donor (1936–2025)

James Harrison OAM
- Harrison in 2018
- Born: James Christopher Harrison; 27 December 1936; Junee, New South Wales, Australia
- Died: 17 February 2025 (aged 88); Umina Beach, New South Wales, Australia
- Other name: "Man with the Golden Arm"
- Known for: Blood donation
- Spouse: Barbara Lindbeck (died 2005)
- Children: 1

James Christopher Harrison OAM (27 December 1936 – 17 February 2025) was an Australian blood donor known as the "Man with the Golden Arm" for his prolific history of donations, 1,173 times between the ages 18 to 81.

Harrison primarily donated plasma after his blood was found to contain antibodies against the Rh D antigen, making them useful in preventing Rh disease, and was one of the founding donors for the New South Wales Rh Program.

== Early life ==
James Christopher Harrison was born in Junee, New South Wales, on 27 December 1936 to Peggy and Reginald Harrison.

In 1951, aged 14, he underwent major chest surgery that required the transfusion of a large amount of donated blood. Despite his fear of needles, he made a pledge to give back by donating blood as soon as he reached the required age of 18.

== Blood donations ==
Harrison started donating in 1954. After the first few donations, it was discovered that his blood contained unusually strong and persistent antibodies against the D Rh group antigen. Blood which contains a high level of anti-D antibodies can be processed to create immunoglobulin-based products used to prevent haemolytic disease of the newborn (HDN). These products are given to Rh(D)-negative mothers of unknown or Rh(D)-positive babies during and after pregnancy to prevent the formation of antibodies against the blood of the Rh(D)-positive child. This antigen sensitization and subsequent incompatibility phenomenon causes Rh disease, the most common form of HDN.

Harrison was one of the founding donors of the New South Wales Rh Program, one of the first in the world, in 1969; he continuously donated from then onwards. Unlike whole blood, blood plasma can be donated as often as once every two weeks, allowing him to reach his 1,000th donation in May 2011. This had required an average of one donation every three weeks across 57 years. Commenting on his record, he said: "I could say it's the only record that I hope is broken, because if they do, they have donated a thousand donations." On 11 May 2018, he made his 1,173rd and last donation in compliance with Australian policy prohibiting blood donations from those past age 81.

Through their donations, the members of NSW's Rh Program have provided millions of doses of anti-D and helped prevent thousands of deaths and stillbirths, as well as many more instances of sickness and disability caused by HDN. Over his lifetime, Harrison's donations amounted to tens of thousands of doses worth of antibodies and had contributed to every batch of anti-D produced in NSW. He was awarded the Medal of the Order of Australia (OAM) on 7 June 1999.

In 2007, Harrison was critical of plans to open up Australia's plasma donation to foreign corporations. He believed that opening up the trade will discourage volunteer donations. This opening of trade stemmed from a review of the country's free trade agreement with the US. In 2011, he was nominated in the New South Wales Local Hero division of the Australian of the Year awards.

Research is being conducted with the goal of creating a mixture of monoclonal antibodies, manufactured in bioreactors by hybridomas, that matches what is naturally produced in the bodies of donors such as Harrison with the goal being colloquially called "James in a Jar".

== Personal life and death ==
Harrison was married to Barbara Lindbeck, a fellow blood donor from his hometown of Junee, from an unknown date until her death in 2005. They resided in Umina Beach, New South Wales, about 500 km (310 mi) from their hometown. They had a daughter named Tracey, through whom they had two grandsons named Jarrod and Scott. Injections containing Harrison's donations were later used on Tracey when she was pregnant with Scott and again on Jarrod's wife Rebecca during her pregnancies, with Jarrod remarking, "It's pretty cool that part of him went into mum and got me a brother, then protected my kids [and] his great-grandkids."

On 17 February 2025, Harrison died in his sleep at the Peninsula Villages nursing home in Umina Beach. He was 88.
