= Ronald Finn =

- Born: 12 June 1930; Liverpool, England
- Died: 21 May 2004 (age 73)
- Occupation: Consultant physician
- Known for: Pioneering work on prevention of Rh disease

Ronald Finn (12 June 1930 – 21 May 2004) was a medical researcher born in Liverpool, England. His research work contributed to advancing knowledge on the Rhesus factor. He died of cancer of the stomach.

== Career and awards ==
1954 - Qualified as a medical doctor from Liverpool University.

1958 - MRCP

1961 - Appointed consultant in kidney disease at a Liverpool Hospital.

1980 - Finn, together with Cyril Clarke, John Gorman, Vincent Freda, and William Pollack were jointly awarded the 1980 Albert Lasker Award for Clinical Medical Research for pioneering work on the Rhesus blood group system, the role of anti-RhD antibodies in the causation of Rh disease, and the prevention of Rh disease with anti-D antibodies.

1997 - Retired from clinical work.

2000 - Appointed visiting professor in immunology at Liverpool University.
