= Hemolytic disease of the newborn (anti-Kell) =

HDN due to anti-Kell alloimmunization
- Specialty: Obstetrics, maternal–fetal medicine, neonatology

Hemolytic disease of the newborn (anti-Kell_{1}) is the second most common cause of severe hemolytic disease of the newborn (HDN) after Rh disease. Anti-Kell_{1} is becoming relatively more important as prevention of Rh disease is also becoming more effective.

Hemolytic disease of the newborn (anti-Kell_{1}) is caused by a mismatch between the Kell antigens of the mother and fetus. About 91% of the population are Kell_{1} negative and about 9% are Kell_{1} positive. A fraction of a percentage are homozygous for Kell_{1}. Therefore, about 4.5% of babies born to a Kell_{1} negative mother are Kell_{1} positive.

The disease results when maternal antibodies to Kell_{1} are transferred to the fetus across the placental barrier, breaching immune privilege. These antibodies can cause severe anemia by interfering with the early proliferation of red blood cells as well as causing alloimmune hemolysis. Very severe disease can occur as early as 20 weeks gestation. Hydrops fetalis can also occur early. The finding of anti-Kell antibodies in an antenatal screening blood test (indirect Coombs test) is an indication for early referral to a specialist service for assessment, management and treatment.

== Presentation ==
=== Complications ===
- High at birth or rapidly rising bilirubin
- Prolonged hyperbilirubinemia
- Bilirubin Induced Neuorlogical Dysfunction
- Cerebral Palsy
- Kernicterus
- Neutropenia
- Thrombocytopenia
- Hemolytic Anemia - MUST NOT be treated with iron
- Late onset anemia - Must NOT be treated with iron. Can persist up to 12 weeks after birth.

== Cause ==
Mothers who are negative for the Kell_{1} antigen develop antibodies after being exposed to red blood cells that are positive for Kell_{1}. Over half of the cases of hemolytic disease of the newborn owing the anti-Kell antibodies are caused by multiple blood transfusions, with the remainder due to a previous pregnancy with a Kell_{1} positive baby.

== Mechanism ==
Hemolytic disease of the fetus and newborn (HDN) is a condition where the passage of maternal antibodies results in the hemolysis of fetal/neonatal red cells. The antibodies can be naturally occurring such as anti-A, and anti-B, or immune antibodies developed following a sensitizing event. Isoimmunization occurs when the maternal immune system is sensitized to red blood cell surface antigens. The most common causes of isoimmunization are blood transfusion, and fetal-maternal hemorrhage. The hemolytic process can result in anemia, hyperbilirubinemia, neonatal thrombocytopenia, and neonatal neutropenia. With the use of RhD Immunoprophylaxis, (commonly called Rhogam), the incidence of anti-D has decreased dramatically and other alloantibodies are now a major cause of HDN.

=== Antibody specific ===
Anti-Kell can cause severe anemia regardless of titer. Anti-Kell suppresses the bone marrow, by inhibiting the erythroid progenitor cells.

anti-Kell_{2}, anti-Kell_{3} and anti-Kell_{4} antibodies

Hemolytic disease of the newborn can also be caused by anti-Kell_{2}, anti-Kell_{3} and anti-Kell_{4} IgG antibodies. These are rarer and generally the disease is milder.

== Diagnosis ==
Testing for HDN involves blood work from both mother and father, and may also include assessment with amniocentesis and Middle Cerebral Artery scans.

=== Mother ===
Blood testing for the mother is called an Indirect Coombs Test (ICT) or an Indirect Agglutination Test (IAT). This test tells whether there are antibodies in the maternal plasma. If positive, the antibody is identified and given a titer. Titers of 1:4 or higher is considered critical for Kell (compared to 1:16 for most other antibodies) and is considered to confer a high risk of fetal anemia. Such high titers may be managed by weekly follow-up by obstetric ultrasound, assessing the peak systolic velocity of the fetal middle cerebral arterial (MCA), amniotic fluid volume, as well as fetal signs of anemia or hydrops.

=== Father ===
Blood is generally drawn from the father to help determine fetal antigen status. If he is homozygous for the antigen, there is a 100% chance of all offspring in the pairing to be positive for the antigen and at risk for HDN. If he is heterozygous, there is a 50% chance of offspring to be positive for the antigen. This test can help with knowledge for the current baby, as well as aid in the decision about future pregnancies. With RhD, the test is called the RhD genotype. With RhCE, and Kell antigen it is called an antigen phenotype.

=== Fetus ===
There are 3 possible ways to test the fetal antigen status. Cell-free DNA, Amniocentesis, and Chorionic Villus Sampling (CVS). Of the three, CVS is no longer used due to risk of worsening the maternal antibody response. Once antigen status has been determined, assessment may be done with MCA scans.

- Cell-free DNA can be used the determine the Rh antigen of the fetus when the mother is Rh negative. Blood is taken from the mother during the pregnancy, and using PCR, can detect the K, C, c, D, and E alleles of fetal DNA. This blood test is non-invasive to the fetus and is an easy way of checking antigen status and risk of HDN. For patients in the United States, BillionToOne, Inc. based in Menlo Park, California offers a non-invasive prenatal test (NIPT) called Unity that can used to determine the fetal Rh antigen for mothers who are Rh negative. Because Unity is the only test in the world that uses next generation sequencing (NGS) to determine the fetal antigen, it is the only test that can screen for the fetal Rh antigen as early as the 10th week of gestation. For patients in the UK testing is offered through the International Blood Group Reference Laboratory in Bristol. Sanequin laboratory in Amsterdam, Netherlands also performs this test. The European tests for fetal Rh antigen utilize qPCR or real-time PCR technology; therefore, testing has to wait until at least the 20th week of gestation. Sensigene used to be offered by Sequenome to determine the fetal Rh antigen. However, this test has been taken off the market.
- Amniocentesis is another recommended method for testing antigen status and risk for HDN. Fetal antigen status can be tested as early as 15 weeks by PCR of fetal cells.
- CVS is possible as well to test fetal antigen status but is not recommended. CVS carries a higher risk of fetal maternal hemorrhage and can raise antibody titers, potentially worsening the antibody effect.

=== MCA scans ===
Middle cerebral artery - peak systolic velocity is changing the way sensitized pregnancies are managed. This test is done noninvasively with ultrasound. By measuring the peak velocity of blood flow in the middle cerebral artery, a MoM (multiple of the median) score can be calculated. MoM of 1.5 or greater indicates severe anemia and should be treated with intrauterine transfusion (IUT).

== Management ==
There are several intervention options available in early, mid and late pregnancies.

=== Early pregnancy ===
- IVIG - IVIG stands for Intravenous Immunoglobulin. It is used in cases of previous loss, high maternal titers, known aggressive antibodies, and in cases where religion prevents blood transfusion. Ivig can be more effective than IUT alone. Fetal mortality was reduced by 36% in the IVIG and IUT group than in the IUT alone group. IVIG and plasmapheresis together can reduce or eliminate the need for an IUT.
- Plasmapheresis - Plasmapheresis aims to decrease the maternal titer by direct plasma replacement. Plasmapheresis and IVIG together can even be used on women with previously hydropic fetuses and losses.

=== Mid to late pregnancy ===
- IUT - Intrauterine Transfusion (IUT) is done either by intraperitoneal transfusion (IPT) or intravenous transfusion (IVT). IVT is preferred over IPT. IUTs are only done until 35 weeks. After that, the risk of an IUT is greater than the risk from post birth transfusion.
- Steroids - Steroids are sometimes given to the mother before IUTs and early delivery to mature the fetal lungs.
- Phenobarbital - Phenobarbital is sometimes given to the mother to help mature the fetal liver and reduce hyperbilirubinemia.
- Early Delivery - Delivery can occur anytime after the age of viability. Emergency delivery due to failed IUT is possible, along with induction of labor at 35–38 weeks.

== After Birth ==
=== Testing ===
- Coombs - after birth baby will have a direct coombs test run to confirm antibodies attached to the infant's red blood cells. This test is run from cord blood.

In some cases, the direct coombs will be negative but severe, even fatal HDN can occur. An indirect coombs needs to be run in cases of anti-C, anti-c, and anti-M. Anti-M also recommends antigen testing to rule out the presence of HDN.

- Hgb - the infant's hemoglobin should be tested from cord blood.
- Reticulocyte count - Reticulocytes are elevated when the infant is producing more blood to combat anemia. A rise in the retic count can mean that an infant may not need additional transfusions. Low retic is observed in infants treated with IUT and in those with HDN from anti-Kell
- Neutrophils - as Neutropenia is one of the complications of HDN, the neutrophil count should be checked.
- Thrombocytes - as thrombocytopenia is one of the complications of HDN, the thrombocyte count should be checked.
- Bilirubin should be tested from cord blood.
- Ferritin - because most infants affected by HDN have iron overload, a ferritin must be run before giving the infant any additional iron.
- Newborn Screening Tests - Transfusion with donor blood during pregnancy or shortly after birth can affect the results of the Newborn Screening Tests. It is recommended to wait and retest 10–12 months after last transfusion. In some cases, DNA testing from saliva can be used to rule out certain conditions.

== Prevention ==
Suggestions have been made that women of child-bearing age or young girls should not be given a transfusion with Kell_{1} positive blood. Donated blood is not currently screened (in the U.S.A.) for the Kell blood group antigens as it is not considered cost effective at this time.

It has been hypothesized that IgG anti-Kell_{1} antibody injections would prevent sensitization to RBC surface Kell_{1} antigens in a similar way that IgG anti-D antibodies (Rho(D) Immune Globulin) are used to prevent Rh disease, but the methods for IgG anti-Kell_{1} antibodies have not been developed at the present time.

== Treatment ==
- Phototherapy - Phototherapy is used for cord bilirubin of 3 or higher. Some doctors use it at lower levels while awaiting lab results.
- IVIG - IVIG has been used to successfully treat many cases of HDN. It has been used not only on anti-D, but on anti-E as well. IVIG can be used to reduce the need for exchange transfusion and to shorten the length of phototherapy. The AAP recommends "In isoimmune hemolytic disease, administration of intravenousγ-globulin (0.5-1 g/kg over 2 hours) is recommended if the TSB is rising despite intensive phototherapy or the TSB level is within 2 to 3 mg/dL (34-51 μmol/L) of the exchange level . If necessary, this dose can be repeated in 12 hours (evidence quality B: benefits exceed harms). Intravenous γ-globulin has been shown to reduce the need for exchange transfusions in Rh and ABO hemolytic disease."
- Exchange transfusion - Exchange transfusion is used when bilirubin reaches either the high or medium risk lines on the nonogram provided by the American Academy of Pediatrics (Figure 4). Cord bilirubin >4 is also indicative of the need for exchange transfusion.

== Transfusion Reactions ==
Once a woman has antibodies, she is at high risk for a transfusion reaction. For this reason, she must carry a medical alert card at all times and inform all doctors of her antibody status.

"Acute hemolytic transfusion reactions may be either immune-mediated or nonimmune-mediated. Immune-mediated hemolytic transfusion reactions caused by immunoglobulin M (IgM) anti-A, anti-B, or anti-A,B typically result in severe, potentially fatal complement-mediated intravascular hemolysis. Immune-mediated hemolytic reactions caused by IgG, Rh, Kell, Duffy, or other non-ABO antibodies typically result in extravascular sequestration, shortened survival of transfused red cells, and relatively mild clinical reactions. Acute hemolytic transfusion reactions due to immune hemolysis may occur in patients who have no antibodies detectable by routine laboratory procedures"

Summary of transfusion reactions in the US

== See also ==
- Coombs test
- Hematology
- Hemolytic anemia
- Kell antigen system
- Hemolytic disease of the newborn
