= Exchange transfusion =

Exchange and transfusion blood

- Other names: Exsanguination transfusion, replacement transfusion, substitution transfusion
- ICD-9: 99.01
- MeSH: D005078
- OPS-301 code: 8-801
- MedlinePlus: 002923

An exchange transfusion (ET) is a blood transfusion in which the patient's blood or components of it are exchanged with (replaced by) other blood or blood products. The patient's blood is removed and replaced by donated blood or blood components. This exchange transfusion can be performed manually or using a machine (apheresis).

Most blood transfusions involve adding blood or blood products without removing any blood; these are also known as simple transfusions or top-up transfusions.

Exchange transfusion is used in the treatment of a number of diseases, including sickle-cell disease and hemolytic disease of the newborn. Partial exchange might be required for polycythemia.

Nearly all exchange transfusions are allogeneic (that is, the new blood or blood products come from another person or persons, via donated blood); autologous exchange transfusion is possible (using autologous blood banking), but there are not many situations in which a need for it arises, as most autologous transfusions involve no exchange.

== Description ==
An exchange transfusion requires that the patient's blood can be removed and replaced. In most cases, this involves placing one or more thin tubes, called catheters, into a blood vessel. The exchange transfusion is done in cycles: each one usually lasts a few minutes.

The patient's blood is slowly withdrawn (usually about 5 to 20 mL at a time, depending on the patient's size and the severity of illness), and a slightly larger amount of fresh, prewarmed blood or plasma flows into the patient's body. This cycle is repeated until the correct volume of blood has been replaced.

After the exchange transfusion, catheters may be left in place in case the procedure needs to be repeated.

In diseases such as sickle cell anemia, blood is removed and replaced with donor blood.

In conditions such as neonatal polycythemia, a specific amount of the child's blood is removed and replaced with normal saline, plasma (the clear liquid portion of blood), or an albumin solution. This decreases the total number of red blood cells in the body and makes it easier for blood to flow through the body.

== Medical uses ==
=== Sickle cell disease ===
Transfusion therapy is used as an emergency procedure to treat life-threatening complications of sickle-cell disease as well as an elective procedure to stop these complications occurring.

==== Treatment of life-threatening complications ====
- Acute cerebrovascular event (stroke)
- Acute chest syndrome with respiratory failure
- Multi-organ failure
- Mesenteric girdle syndrome

The commonest emergency reason is to treat an acute chest syndrome.

==== Prevention ====
- Prior to surgery in people with sickle cell anemia (HbSS) who already have a hemoglobin above 85g/L, or who require a prolonged operation with general anesthetic, or who need high-risk surgery
- To optimise hemoglobin S levels, for example to prevent a stroke occurring in a child. The target is usually to maintain a hemoglobin S level below 30% to prevent complications occurring.

The most common routine reason is to prevent a stroke occurring or re-occurring.

=== Hemolytic disease of the newborn ===
Exchange transfusion to treat hemolytic disease of the newborn is now uncommon since the introduction of Anti-D prophylaxis in pregnancy. However, it can occur due to the development of other antibodies such as anti-c, anti-E, and ABO.

=== Polycythemia ===
Polycythemia, a condition in which the number of red cells in the blood is too high, is usually diagnosed when the hematocrit is above 65%. Polycythemia can occur in neonates for multiple different reasons including: babies born after 42 weeks gestation (post-term), babies born to diabetic mothers, twin to twin transfusion, intrauterine growth restriction, and babies with genetic abnormalities. Polycythemia can make the blood thicker than normal and therefore lead to complications. Partial exchange transfusion has been used as a treatment to prevent complications, and has been shown to improve cerebral blood flow, but there is no evidence that it prevents long-term complications.

=== Severe malaria ===
Exchange transfusion has been used for the treatment of severe malaria in the past. However, in 2013 the CDC examined the limited evidence available and found no evidence that exchange transfusion has any beneficial effects (decreased mortality) in people with very high parasite loads (> 10%). Also, although uncommon, exchange transfusion can cause complications (low blood pressure (hypotension), abnormal heart rhythms (ventricular fibrillation) and breathing problems (acute respiratory distress syndrome)). Based on this evidence, the CDC no longer recommend the use of exchange transfusion in the treatment of malaria.

== Risks ==
General risks are the same as with any transfusion. Other possible complications include:

- Blood clots
- Changes in blood chemistry (high or low potassium, low calcium, low glucose, change in acid-base balance in the blood)
- Heart and lung problems
- Infection (greatly decreased risk due to careful screening of blood)
- Shock due to inadequate replacement of blood

== Recovery ==
The person may need to be monitored for several days in the hospital after the transfusion, but the length of stay generally depends on the condition for which the exchange transfusion was performed. Sickle cell disease patients may be exchanged in an outpatient setting and can be sent home the same day.

== History ==
The technique was originally developed by Alexander S. Wiener, soon after he co-discovered the Rh factor.

== See also ==
- Plasmapheresis
- Neonatal red cell transfusion
- Hemolytic disease of the newborn
- Exchange transfusion in sickle cell disease
