= Neonatal red cell transfusion =

Neonates are defined as babies up to 28 days after birth. Most extremely preterm babies (less than 28 weeks) require at least one red cell transfusion; this is partly due to the amount of blood removed with blood samples compared to the baby's total blood volume (iatrogenic anemia) and partly due to anemia of prematurity. Most transfusions are given as small volume top-up transfusions to increase the baby's hemoglobin above a certain pre-defined level, or because the baby is unwell due to the anemia. Possible side-effects of anemia in babies can be poor growth, lethargy and episodes of apnea. Exchange blood transfusion is used to treat a rapidly rising bilirubin that does not respond to treatment with phototherapy or intravenous immunoglobulin. This is usually due to hemolytic disease of the newborn, but may also be due to other causes, e.g., G6PD deficiency.

== When to transfuse ==
Below are suggested transfusion thresholds for very preterm neonates (less than 32 weeks gestation) by the British Society of Haematology. These are based on systematic reviews of transfusion in very preterm babies.

Age after birth	No respiratory support Hb g/L	On oxygen Hb g/L	Requiring ventilation Hb g/L
Up to 24 hours	< 100	< 120	< 120
1 to 7 days	< 100	<100	< 120
8 to 14 days	< 75	< 95	< 100
More than 14 days	< 75	< 85	< 100

There is no evidence for red cell transfusion thresholds in preterm neonates between 32 and 37 weeks gestation, and the British Society of Haematology suggests using the same thresholds as very preterm neonates that require no respiratory support.

== What to transfuse ==
A small volume transfusion is usually 10 to 20 ml/kg administered at a rate of 5 ml/kg/hour.

A large volume transfusion is the estimated entire blood volume of the baby (80 ml/kg) and is usually given during cardiac surgery.

A red cell exchange transfusion is usually given to treat severe hyperbilirubinemia or anemia in babies with hemolytic disease of the newborn. It removes neonatal red cells coated with maternal antibody and reduces the level of bilirubin. A 'double volume exchange' (160–200 ml/kg) removes around 90% of neonatal red cells and 50% of bilirubin.

The specification of the blood product differs depending on whether it is to be used for a small volume, large volume or exchange transfusion.

There does not appear to be any benefit to giving fresher red blood cells (less than a week from donation) compared to standard red cells (usually two weeks after donation) for small volume transfusions.

== Safety considerations ==
The Serious Hazards of Transfusion (SHOT) hemovigilance reporting scheme has shown that there are a disproportionate number of transfusion errors in babies. There are multiple reasons why this occurs. It can be due to confusion between samples from the mother and the baby, birth of more than one baby, babies who don't yet have a first name, or that no ID information has been attached to the baby (e.g. wristband).

Paedipacks are multiple aliquots made from one adult blood donation. By using paedipacks, the baby is exposed to blood from fewer blood donors.

ABO blood grouping and screening for antibodies in neonates differs from blood grouping in adults and older children. Any antibodies detected are the mother's antibodies rather than the baby's. Therefore, any donor blood given to the baby must be ABO and D compatible with both mother and baby; and antigen-negative for any clinically significant maternal antibodies.

Necrotising enterocolitis may occur after a red cell transfusion in neonates, although there is an association between the two there is no evidence that the transfusion causes the disorder.

== See also ==
- Hemolytic disease of the newborn
- Exchange transfusion
