= Hemolytic disease of the newborn (ABO) =

Maternal IgG antibodies

ABO HDN
- Specialty: Hematology/pediatrics

In ABO hemolytic disease of the newborn (also known as ABO HDN) maternal IgG antibodies with specificity for the ABO blood group system pass through the placenta to the fetal circulation where they can cause hemolysis of fetal red blood cells which can lead to fetal anemia and HDN. In contrast to Rh disease, about half of the cases of ABO HDN occur in a firstborn baby and ABO HDN does not become more severe after further pregnancies.

The ABO blood group system is the best known surface antigen system, expressed on a wide variety of human cells. For Caucasian populations about one fifth of all pregnancies have ABO incompatibility between the fetus and the mother, but only a very small minority develop symptomatic ABO HDN. The latter typically only occurs in mothers of blood group O due to an increased chance of the antibodies against A and B antigens being of the IgG subclass, as opposed to the more common IgM subclass which is unable to cross the placenta.

Although very uncommon, cases of ABO HDN have been reported in infants born to mothers with blood groups A and B.

== Presentation ==
=== Complications ===
- High at birth or rapidly rising bilirubin
- Prolonged hyperbilirubinemia
- Bilirubin Induced Neurological Dysfunction
- Cerebral Palsy
- Kernicterus
- Neutropenia
- Thrombocytopenia
- Hemolytic Anemia - MUST NOT be treated with iron
- Late onset anemia - Must NOT be treated with iron. Can persist up to 12 weeks after birth.

== Causes ==
Environmental exposure
Anti-A and anti-B antibodies are usually IgM and do not pass through the placenta, but some mothers "naturally" have IgG anti-A or IgG anti-B antibodies, which can pass through the placenta. Exposure to A-antigens and B-antigens, which are both widespread in nature, usually leads to the production of IgM anti-A and IgM anti-B antibodies but occasionally IgG antibodies are produced.

Fetal-maternal transfusion
Some mothers may be sensitized by fetal-maternal transfusion of ABO incompatible red blood and produce immune IgG antibodies against the antigen they do not have and their baby does. For example, when a mother of genotype OO (blood group O) carries a fetus of genotype AO (blood group A) she may produce IgG anti-A antibodies. The father will either have blood group A, with genotype AA or AO or, more rarely, have blood group AB, with genotype AB.

Blood transfusion
It would be very rare for ABO sensitization to be due to therapeutic blood transfusion as a great deal of effort and checking is done to ensure that blood is ABO compatible between the recipient and the donor.

== Risk factors ==
In about a third of all ABO incompatible pregnancies maternal IgG anti-A or IgG anti-B antibodies pass through the placenta to the fetal circulation leading to a weakly positive direct Coombs test for the neonate's blood. However, ABO HDN is generally mild and short-lived and only occasionally severe because:

- IgG anti-A (or IgG anti-B) antibodies that enter the fetal circulation from the mother find A (or B) antigens on many different fetal cell types, leaving fewer antibodies available for binding onto fetal red blood cells.
- Fetal RBC surface A and B antigens are not fully developed during gestation and so there are a smaller number of antigenic sites on fetal RBCs.

== Diagnosis ==
Routine antenatal antibody screening blood tests (indirect Coombs test) do not screen for ABO HDN. If IgG anti-A or IgG anti-B antibodies are found in the pregnant woman's blood, they are not reported with the test results, because they do not correlate well with ABO HDN. Diagnosis is usually made by investigation of a newborn baby who has developed jaundice during the first week of life.

Testing

- Coombs - after birth, the newborn will have a direct Coombs test run to confirm antibodies attached to the infant's red blood cells. This test is run from cord blood. In some cases, the direct Coombs will be negative but severe, even fatal HDN can occur. An indirect Coombs needs to be run in cases of anti-C, anti-c, or anti-M presence. In case of anti-M detection, it is also recommended to perform antigen testing to rule out the presence of HDN.
- Hgb - the infant's hemoglobin should be tested from cord blood.
- Reticulocyte count - Reticulocytes are elevated when the infant is producing more blood to combat anemia. A rise in the reticulocyte count can mean that an infant may not need additional transfusions. Low reticulocyte count is observed in infants treated with IUT and in those with HDN from anti-Kell
- Neutrophils - as Neutropenia is one of the complications of HDN, the neutrophil count should be checked.
- Thrombocytes - as thrombocytopenia is one of the complications of HDN, the thrombocyte count should be checked.
- Bilirubin should be tested from cord blood.
- Ferritin - because most infants affected by HDN have iron overload, ferritin levels must be measured before giving the infant any additional iron.
- Newborn Screening Tests - Transfusion with donor blood during pregnancy or shortly after birth can affect the results of the Newborn Screening Tests. It is recommended to wait and retest 10–12 months after the last transfusion. In some cases, DNA testing from saliva can be used to rule out certain conditions.

== Treatment ==
The antibodies in ABO HDN cause anemia due to destruction of fetal red blood cells and jaundice due to the rise in blood levels of bilirubin a by-product of hemoglobin break down. If the anemia is severe, it can be treated with a blood transfusion, however this is rarely needed. On the other hand, neonates have underdeveloped livers that are unable to process large amounts of bilirubin and a poorly developed blood–brain barrier that is unable to block bilirubin from entering the brain. This can result in kernicterus if left unchecked. If the bilirubin level is sufficiently high as to cause worry, it can be lowered via phototherapy in the first instance or an exchange transfusion if severely elevated.

- Phototherapy - Phototherapy is used for cord bilirubin of 3 or higher. Some doctors use it at lower levels while awaiting lab results.
- IVIG - Intravenous Immunoglobulin therapy (IVIG) has been used to successfully treat many cases of HDN. It has been used not only on anti-D, but on anti-E as well. IVIG can be used to reduce the need for exchange transfusion and to shorten the length of phototherapy. The AAP recommends "In isoimmune hemolytic disease, administration of intravenous γ-globulin (0.5-1 g/kg over 2 hours) is recommended if the TSB is rising despite intensive phototherapy or the TSB level is within 2 to 3 mg/dL (34-51 μmol/L) of the exchange level . If necessary, this dose can be repeated in 12 hours (evidence quality B: benefits exceed harms). Intravenous γ-globulin has been shown to reduce the need for exchange transfusions in Rh and ABO hemolytic disease."
- Exchange transfusion - Exchange transfusion is used when bilirubin reaches either the high or medium risk lines on the normogram provided by the American Academy of Pediatrics (Figure 4). Cord bilirubin >4 is also indicative of the need for exchange transfusion.

== See also ==
- Coombs test
- Hemolytic anemia
- Hematology
