= Arthur Mourant =

British Genetic anthropologist

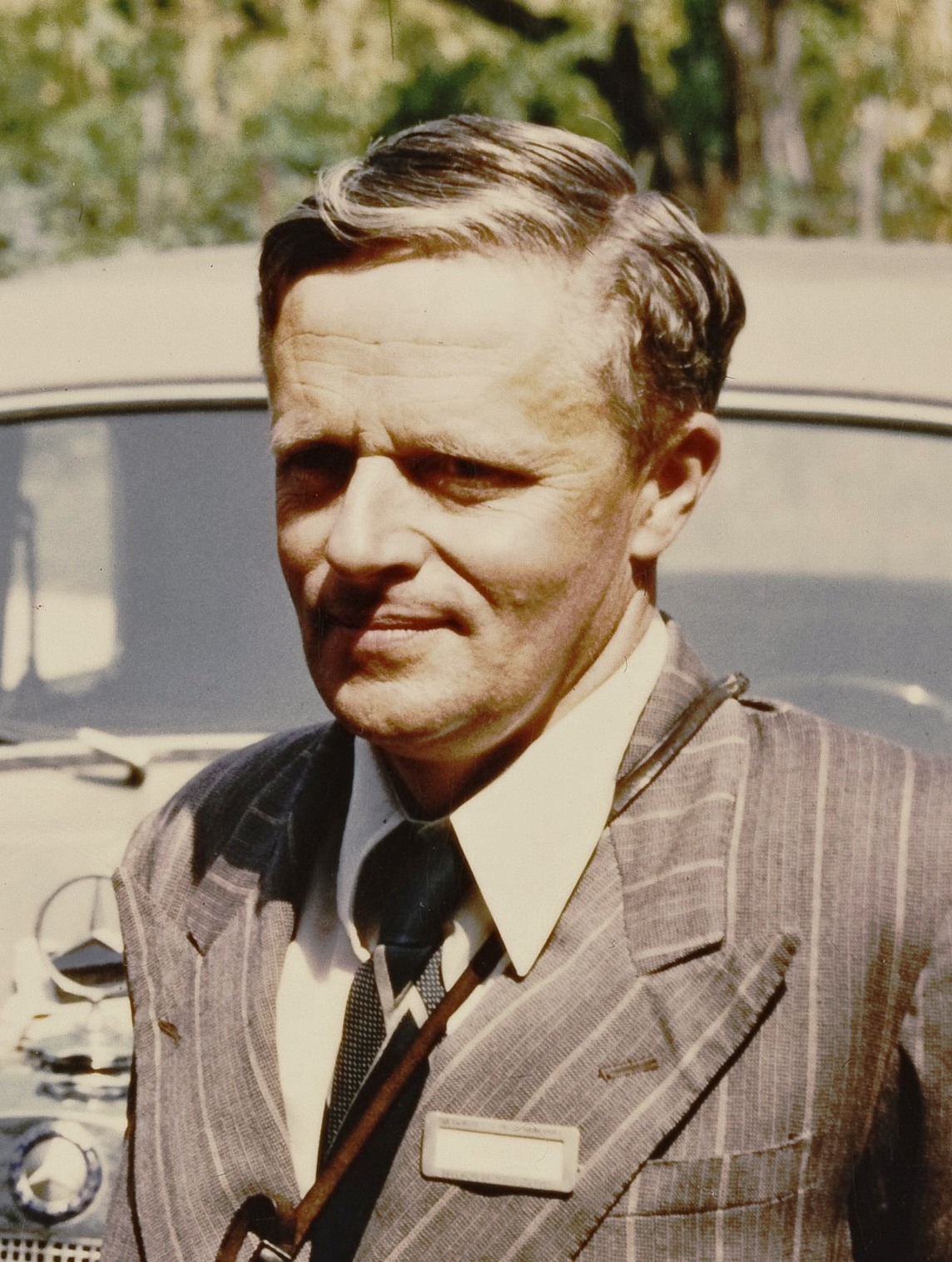
- Arthur Mourant in 1954
- Born: 11 April 1904; La Hougue Bie, Jersey
- Died: 29 August 1994 (aged 90); Jersey
- Education: Exeter College, Oxford University
- Known for: Biological anthropology and distribution
- Scientific career
- Fields: Anthropology and Medicine

Arthur Ernest Mourant FRS (11 April 1904 – 29 August 1994) was a British chemist, hematologist and geneticist who pioneered research into biological anthropology and its distribution, genetics, clinical and laboratory medicine, and geology.

Mourant graduated from the University of Oxford with honours in chemistry and a Doctor of Philosophy in geology in 1931. He was an early advocate of the then discredited Wegener theory of continental drift, which subsequently gained acceptability as plate tectonics. When he left Oxford he failed to find a position in his chosen discipline and returned to his childhood home of Jersey, where he set up a pathology laboratory.

He later studied medicine and surgery at St Bartholomew's Medical College, London, joining the Galton Laboratory Serum Unit in 1946 and then founding the Blood Group Reference Laboratory in London, where he was director for 20 years.

He pioneered a study of hematology of the worldwide distribution of blood groups. This work help build the genetic map of the world by studying and classifying blood groups across many populations and ethnic groups. His book, The Distribution of the Human Blood Groups, definitively drew together current knowledge on blood groups and their distribution. It launched anthropology on a new scientific basis as it described the genetic evidence for biological relationships, and allowed theories of population genetics to be developed and examined. This had far-reaching effects on medicine, research into genetic diseases, blood transfusion, and public health.

Mourant also studied the new blood group antigens of the Lewis, Henshaw, Kell, and Rhesus systems, biological polymorphisms, and animal serological characteristics for fish stocks and cattle breeds.

Amongst his many honours and recognitions, he gained a Fellowship of the Royal Society, the Huxley Memorial Medal of the Royal Anthropological Institute, Landsteiner Memorial Award of the American Association of Blood Banks and honorary member of the Human Biology Council.

== Bibliography ==
- The Distribution of the Human Blood Groups and Other Polymorphisms, 1954, updated 1976.
- The ABO Blood Groups, 1958
- Blood Groups and Disease, 1978
- The Genetics of the Jews, 1978
- Blood Relations 1983
