= Hemolytic disease of the newborn (anti-RhE) =

HDN due to anti-RhE alloimmunization
- Other names: anti-RhE
- Specialty: Pediatrics

Hemolytic disease of the newborn (anti-RhE) is caused by the anti-RhE antibody of the Rh blood group system. The anti-RhE antibody can be naturally occurring, or arise following immune sensitization after a blood transfusion or pregnancy.

The anti-RhE antibody is quite common especially in the Rh genotype CDe/CDe; it usually only causes a mild hemolytic disease, but can cause a severe condition in the newborn. It can occur with other antibodies, usually the anti-Rhc antibody, which can also cause a severe hemolytic disease.

One study done by Moran et al., found that titers are not reliable for anti-E. Their most severe case of hemolytic disease of the newborn occurred with titers 1:2. Moran states that it would be unwise routinely to dismiss anti-E as being of little clinical consequence.

== Presentation ==
=== Complications ===
- High at birth or rapidly rising bilirubin
- Prolonged hyperbilirubinemia
- Bilirubin-induced neurological dysfunction
- Cerebral palsy
- Kernicterus
- Thrombocytopenia
- Hemolytic anemia – must not be treated with iron
- Late onset anemia – must not be treated with iron. Can persist up to 12 weeks after birth.

== Mechanism ==
Hemolytic disease of the fetus and newborn (HDN) is a condition where the passage of maternal antibodies results in the hemolysis of fetal/neonatal red cells. The antibodies can be naturally occurring such as anti-A, and anti-B, or immune antibodies developed following a sensitizing event. Isoimmunization occurs when the maternal immune system is sensitized to red blood cell surface antigens. The most common causes of isoimmunization are blood transfusion, and fetal-maternal hemorrhage. The hemolytic process can result in anemia, hyperbilirubinemia, neonatal thrombocytopenia, and neonatal neutropenia. With the use of RhD Immunoprophylaxis, (commonly called Rhogam), the incidence of anti-D has decreased dramatically and other alloantibodies are now a major cause of HDN.

=== Antibody specific ===
One study done by Moran et al., found that titers are not reliable for anti-E. Their most severe case of hemolytic disease of the newborn occurred with titers 1:2. Moran states that it would be unwise routinely to dismiss anti-E as being of little clinical consequence.

In the case of anti-E, the woman should be checked around 28 weeks to see if she has developed anti-c as well.

== Testing ==
Testing for HDN involves blood work from both mother and father, and may also include assessment with amniocentesis and Middle Cerebral Artery scans.

=== Mother ===
Blood testing for the mother is called an indirect Coombs test (ICT) or an indirect agglutination test (IAT). This test tells whether there are antibodies in the maternal plasma. If positive, the antibody is identified and given a titer. Critical titers are associated with significant risk of fetal anemia and hydrops. Titers of 1:8 or higher is considered critical for Kell. Titers of 1:16 or higher are considered critical for all other antibodies. After critical titer is reached, care is based on MCA scans. If antibodies are low and have a sudden jump later in pregnancy, an MCA scan is warranted. If the titer undergoes a 4 fold increase, it should be considered significant regardless of if the critical value has been reached. Maternal titers are not useful in predicting fetal anemia after the first affected gestation and should not be used for the basis of care. Titers are tested monthly until 24 weeks, after which they are done every 2 weeks.

"In only 2 situations are patients not monitored identically to patients who are Rh sensitized. The first is that of alloimmunization to the c, E, or, C antigens. Some concern exists that hemolysis may occur in these patients with a lower than 1:16 titer. Thus, if the initial titer is 1:4 and stable but increases at 26 weeks' gestation to 1:8, assessment with MCA Doppler velocity at that point is reasonable. However, if the patient presents in the first trimester with a 1:8 titer that remains stable at 1:8 throughout the second trimester, continued serial antibody titers are appropriate. The second situation in which patients should not be treated identically to patients who are Rh D sensitized is that of Kell isoimmunization because several cases of severe fetal hemolysis with anti-Kell antibodies have occurred in the setting of low titers."

In the case of a positive ICT, the woman must carry a medical alert card or bracelet for life because of the risk of a transfusion reaction.

=== Father ===
Blood is generally drawn from the father to help determine fetal antigen status. If he is homozygous for the antigen, there is a 100% chance of all offspring in the pairing to be positive for the antigen and at risk for HDN. If he is heterozygous, there is a 50% chance of offspring to be positive for the antigen. This test can help with knowledge for the current baby, as well as aid in the decision about future pregnancies. With RhD, the test is called the RhD genotype. With RhCE, and Kell antigen it is called an antigen phenotype.

=== Fetus ===
There are three possible ways to test the fetal antigen status. Free cell DNA, amniocentesis, and chorionic villus sampling (CVS). Of the three, CVS is no longer used due to risk of worsening the maternal antibody response. Once antigen status has been determined, assessment may be done with MCA scans.

- Cell-free DNA can be run on certain antigens. Blood is taken from the mother, and using PCR, can detect the K, C, c, D, and E alleles of fetal DNA. This blood test is non-invasive to the fetus and is an easy way of checking antigen status and risk of HDN. Testing has proven very accurate and is routinely done in the UK at the International Blood Group Reference Laboratory in Bristol. Sanequin laboratory in Amsterdam, Netherlands also performs this test. For US patients, blood may be sent to either of the labs. In the US, Sensigene is done by Sequenome to determine fetal D status. Sequenome does not accept insurance in the US, but US and Canadian patients have had insurance cover the testing done overseas.
- Amniocentesis is another recommended method for testing antigen status and risk for HDN. Fetal antigen status can be tested as early as 15 weeks by PCR of fetal cells.
- CVS is possible as well to test fetal antigen status but is not recommended. CVS carries a higher risk of fetal maternal hemorrhage and can raise antibody titers, potentially worsening the antibody effect.

=== MCA scans ===
Middle cerebral artery – peak systolic velocity is changing the way sensitized pregnancies are managed. This test is done noninvasively with ultrasound. By measuring the peak velocity of blood flow in the middle cerebral artery, a MoM (multiple of the median) score can be calculated. MoM of 1.5 or greater indicates severe anemia and should be treated with IUT.

== Intervention ==
There are several intervention options available in early, mid and late pregnancies.

=== Early pregnancy ===
- IVIG – IVIG stands for intravenous immunoglobulin. It is used in cases of previous loss, high maternal titers, known aggressive antibodies, and in cases where religion prevents blood transfusion. Ivig can be more effective than IUT alone. Fetal mortality was reduced by 36% in the IVIG and IUT group than in the IUT alone group. IVIG and plasmapheresis together can reduce or eliminate the need for an IUT.
- Plasmapheresis – Plasmapheresis aims to decrease the maternal titer by direct plasma replacement. Plasmapheresis and IVIG together can even be used on women with previously hydropic fetuses and losses.

=== Mid to late pregnancy ===
- IUT – intrauterine transfusion (IUT) is done either by intraperitoneal transfusion (IPT) or intravenous transfusion (IVT). IVT is preferred over IPT. IUTs are only done until 35 weeks. After that, the risk of an IUT is greater than the risk from post birth transfusion.
- Steroids – steroids are sometimes given to the mother before IUTs and early delivery to mature the fetal lungs.
- Phenobarbital – Phenobarbital is sometimes given to the mother to help mature the fetal liver and reduce hyperbilirubinemia.
- Early delivery – delivery can occur anytime after the age of viability. Emergency delivery due to failed IUT is possible, along with induction of labor at 35–38 weeks.

== After birth ==
=== Testing ===
- Coombs – after birth the baby will have a direct Coombs test run to confirm antibodies attached to the infant's red blood cells. This test is run from cord blood.

In some cases, the direct Coombs will be negative but severe, even fatal HDN can occur. An indirect Coombs needs to be run in cases of anti-C, anti-c, and anti-M. Anti-M also recommends antigen testing to rule out the presence of HDN.

- Hgb – the infant's hemoglobin should be tested from cord blood.
- Reticulocyte count – Reticulocytes are elevated when the infant is producing more blood to combat anemia. A rise in the retic count can mean that an infant may not need additional transfusions. Low retic is observed in infants treated with IUT and in those with HDN from anti-Kell
- Neutrophils – as neutropenia is one of the complications of HDN, the neutrophil count should be checked.
- Thrombocytes – as thrombocytopenia is one of the complications of HDN, the thrombocyte count should be checked.
- Bilirubin should be tested from cord blood.
- Ferritin – because most infants affected by HDN have iron overload, a ferritin must be run before giving the infant any additional iron.
- Newborn screening tests – transfusion with donor blood during pregnancy or shortly after birth can affect the results of the newborn screening tests. It is recommended to wait and retest 10–12 months after last transfusion. In some cases, DNA testing from saliva can be used to rule out certain conditions.

== Treatment ==
- Phototherapy – Phototherapy is used for cord bilirubin of 3 or higher. Some doctors use it at lower levels while awaiting lab results.
- IVIG – IVIG has been used to successfully treat many cases of HDN. It has been used not only on anti-D, but on anti-E as well. IVIG can be used to reduce the need for exchange transfusion and to shorten the length of phototherapy. The AAP recommends "In isoimmune hemolytic disease, administration of intravenousγ-globulin (0.5–1 g/kg over 2 hours) is recommended if the TSB is rising despite intensive phototherapy or the TSB level is within 2 to 3 mg/dL (34–51 μmol/L) of the exchange level. If necessary, this dose can be repeated in 12 hours (evidence quality B: benefits exceed harms). Intravenous γ-globulin has been shown to reduce the need for exchange transfusions in Rh and ABO hemolytic disease."
- Exchange transfusion – exchange transfusion is used when bilirubin reaches either the high or medium risk lines on the nonogram provided by the American Academy of Pediatrics (Figure 4). Cord bilirubin >4 is also indicative of the need for exchange transfusion.

== Transfusion reactions ==
Once a woman has antibodies, she is at high risk for a transfusion reaction. For this reason, she must carry a medical alert card at all times and inform all doctors of her antibody status.

"Acute hemolytic transfusion reactions may be either immune-mediated or nonimmune-mediated. Immune-mediated hemolytic transfusion reactions caused by immunoglobulin M (IgM) anti-A, anti-B, or anti-A,B typically result in severe, potentially fatal complement-mediated intravascular hemolysis. Immune-mediated hemolytic reactions caused by IgG, Rh, Kell, Duffy, or other non-ABO antibodies typically result in extravascular sequestration, shortened survival of transfused red cells, and relatively mild clinical reactions. Acute hemolytic transfusion reactions due to immune hemolysis may occur in patients who have no antibodies detectable by routine laboratory procedures."

Summary of transfusion reactions in the US:

== See also ==
- Coombs test
- Hematology
- Hemolytic anemia
- Hemolytic disease of the newborn
