= Intrauterine transfusion =

An Intrauterine transfusion (IUT) is a procedure that provides blood to a fetus, most commonly through the umbilical cord. It is used in cases of severe fetal anemia, such as when fetal red blood cells are being destroyed by maternal antibodies, or parvovirus B19 infection, homozygous alpha-thalassemia, or twin-to-twin transfusion syndrome. IUTs are performed by perinatologists at hospitals or specialized centers.

== History ==
Intrauterine transfusion (IUT) was introduced in 1963 by A.W. Liley. Early IUTs involved transfusion into the fetal peritoneum (abdomen). Almost 20 years later, the procedure was improved to a transfusion into the umbilical vein, which allowed for better absorption of red blood cells.

== Indications ==
=== Hemolytic disease of the fetus ===
Hemolytic disease of the fetus and newborn (HDFN) is a rare condition that affects 3 out of 100,000 to 80 out of 100,000 patients per year. It occurs when maternal antibodies cross the placenta during pregnancy and destroy fetal red blood cells (RBCs). This process can lead to fetal anemia, and in severe cases can progress to hydrops (edema), ascites, heart failure, and death.

For HDFN to occur, the fetus must be antigen positive (paternally inherited) and the mother must have antibodies to the given antigen. Such antibodies typically form when the mother undergoes alloimmunization to the antigen during a previous pregnancy or transfusion. Historically, RhD alloimmunization accounted for the majority of cases. However, the rates of these cases have been significantly reduced by RhIg (RhoGam) administration. Measures are not available for preventing alloimmunization to non-RhD antigens (Kell, Duffy, Rhc, RhE, etc.), which can also cause HDFN.

Fetal anemia is monitored throughout pregnancy using Doppler measurement of the middle cerebral artery (MCA) peak systolic velocity (PSV). This non-invasive technique is used as a surrogate measurement for assessing fetal anemia. Doppler multiples of median (MoM) measurements exceeding 1.5 are correlated with moderate to severe anemia. At this point, invasive testing via percutaneous umbilical cord blood sampling (PUBS, also called cordocentesis), potentially followed by fetal transfusion is indicated.

== Procedure ==
Prior to the procedure, compatible blood is obtained. This is usually type O, RhD-negative, and antigen-negative for maternal RBC antibodies. The selected blood then undergoes irradiation and leukocyte reduction. Antenatal corticosteroids are typically given to mothers before IUT to anticipate the need for an emergency cesarean section

The procedure is usually performed in a hospital under sterile conditions, within or near an operating room in case an emergency cesarean section is necessary due to complications caused by the procedure. The mother's abdomen is cleaned with an antiseptic solution, and she may or may not be given a local anesthetic injection to numb the abdominal area where the transfusion needle will be inserted. During the procedure, medicine may be given to the fetus to temporarily stop fetal movement.

An ultrasound is performed to view the position of the fetus and to help guide the needle. The first step is to locate a relatively stable segment of the umbilical cord. The procedure may be achieved with more ease if the placenta is in the anterior position. However, if the placenta is in the posterior position, the fetus might block direct access to the umbilical cord. Once a suitable location is established, the needle is inserted through the mother's abdomen into an umbilical vessel using ultrasound guidance. If insertion into an umbilical vessel is not possible, blood may be transfused into the fetal abdomen.

Prior to the transfusion, percutaneous umbilical cord blood sampling (PUBS) is conducted. The fetal blood sample is drawn and immediately analyzed for hematocrit using an automated analyzer in the operating room or hospital hematology laboratory. The result confirms the level of fetal anemia and indicates the correct amount of blood to be transfused.

With the needle still in place, the blood is delivered into the fetus's umbilical cord blood vessel. Following the transfusion, an additional blood sample is drawn and analyzed to determine the ending hematocrit level. The target hematocrit is usually at least 40. In a study of 135 IUTs performed on 56 fetuses, the mean hematocrit was 25.2 before IUT and 40.3 after IUT. This study also noted that repeated IUTs were generally needed in anemic fetuses. In this study, there was a median of two IUTs per fetus, with a range of one to seven.

== Associated risks ==
An IUT is typically only performed when the fetus is known or suspected to have life-threatening anemia. Risks of intrauterine transfusions may include uterine infection, fetal infection, preterm labor, excessive bleeding and mixing of fetal and maternal blood, amniotic fluid leakage from the uterus, or (rarely) fetal death. Fetal survival rates after intrauterine transfusion through the umbilical cord are more than 90% for fetuses that do not have hydrops and about 75% for fetuses that have hydrops.

In a study of 135 IUTs performed on 56 fetuses over 14 years, 121 (90%) of the procedures were uneventful. In 14 cases, (10%), mild adverse events occurred. The most common mild events were prolonged hemorrhage from the puncture site and uterine contractions. In two cases, these led to a severe adverse event: one emergency cesarean section within 24 hours after IUT and one preterm birth within 7 days after IUT. There were no fetal or neonatal deaths in the study population.

Risks associated with an IUT may be avoided by delivering the fetus (via induction or cesarean section) if an acceptable gestational age has been reached. Following delivery, the majority of neonates will require treatment such as phototherapy and top-up transfusion and/or exchange transfusion.

== See also ==
- Hemolytic Disease of the Newborn
- Alloimmunity
- Perinatology
