= Bilirubin encephalopathy =

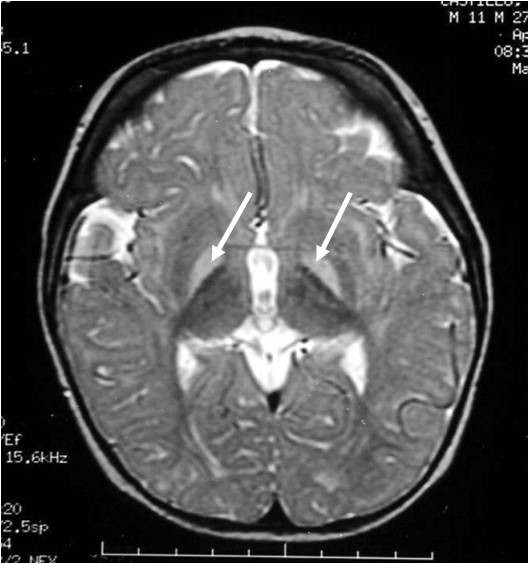
- Brain MRI. Hyperintense basal ganglia lesions on T2-weighted images, showing kernicterus bilirubin encephalopathy.
- Specialty: Neurology, pediatrics
- Diagnostic method: physical examination of moro reflex

Bilirubin encephalopathy is a clinical condition in neonates caused by increased levels of bilirubin that is accumulated within the brain. This disease is a progression of neonatal jaundice if it is not identified and treated. Bilirubin is a naturally occurring substance in the body of humans and many other animals, but it is toxic to brain cells when its concentration in the blood is too high, a condition known as hyperbilirubinemia. Hyperbilirubinemia may cause bilirubin to accumulate in the grey matter of the central nervous system, potentially causing irreversible neurological damage. Depending on the level of exposure, the effects range from clinically unnoticeable to severe brain damage and even death.

When hyperbilirubinemia increases past a mild level, it leads to jaundice, raising the risk of progressing to bilirubin encephalopathy. When this happens in adults, it is usually because of liver problems. Newborns are especially vulnerable to hyperbilirubinemia-induced neurological damage, because in the earliest days of life, the still-developing liver is heavily exercised by the breakdown of fetal hemoglobin as it is replaced with adult hemoglobin and the blood–brain barrier is not as developed. Mildly elevated serum bilirubin levels are common in newborns, and neonatal jaundice is not unusual, but bilirubin levels must be carefully monitored in case they start to climb, in which case more aggressive therapy is needed, usually via light therapy but sometimes even via exchange transfusion.

== Classification ==
=== Acute bilirubin encephalopathy ===
Acute bilirubin encephalopathy is the early stages of the disorder of hyperbilirubinemia during the first days of life. If it is not treated it can progress to Kernicterus which is fatal. Clinically, it encompasses a wide range of symptoms which can be divided into three phases:

Early phase: which is the first 3-5 days of disorder with patients showing signs of lethargy, decreased feeding, hypotonia, hyperreflexia, and a high-pitched cry.
Intermediate phase: At the end of first week of life, patients will show fever, irritability, hypo- and hyperonia, opisthotonos, and still have high-pitched cry.
Advanced phase: Patients will be in a coma, and opisthotonos remains.

=== Kernicterus spectrum disorder (chronic bilirubin encephalopathy) ===
Kernicterus is accumulation of high levels of unconjugated bilirubin within the basal ganglia of brain which can cause neurological lesions. Reduction of bilirubin in this state will not reverse the sequelae. Christian Georg Schmorl coined the term Kernicterus in 1904.

Clinically, manifestations of kernicterus include:

1. movement disorders – dyskinetic CP with often spasticity. 60% have severe motor disability (unable to walk).
2. auditory dysfunction – auditory neuropathy (ANSD)
3. visual/oculomotor impairments (nystagmus, strabismus, impaired upward or downward gaze, and/or cortical visual impairment). In rare cases, decreased visual acuity(blindness) can occur.
4. dental enamel hypoplasia/dysplasia of the deciduous teeth,
5. gastroesophageal reflux,
6. impaired digestive function.
7. slightly decreased intellectual function: Although most individuals (approximately 85%) with kernicterus fall in average or low-average range.
8. epilepsy is uncommon.

These impairments are associated with lesions in the basal ganglia, auditory nuclei of the brain stem, and oculomotor nuclei of the brain stem. Cortex and white matter are subtly involved. Cerebellum may be involved. Severe cortical involvement is uncommon.

=== Subtle bilirubin encephalopathy ===
Subtle bilirubin encephalopathy is a chronic state of mild bilirubin-induced neurological dysfunction (BIND). Clinically, this may result in neurological, learning and movement disorders, isolated hearing loss and auditory dysfunction.

- In the past, it was thought that kernicterus (KI) often causes an intellectual disability. This was assumed due to difficulty with hearing, which is typically not detected in a normal audiogram, accompanied by impairments of speech with choreoathetosis. With advances in technology this has proven to not be the case, as those living with KI have repeatedly demonstrated their intelligence using augmentative communication devices. Although most individuals with kernicteric cerebral palsy have normal intelligence, some children with mild choreoathetosis develop low-normal intelligence or mild intellectual disability even without auditory dysfunction.

== Causes ==
In the vast majority of cases, kernicterus is associated with unconjugated hyperbilirubinemia during the neonatal period. The blood–brain barrier is not fully functional in neonates and therefore bilirubin can cross into the central nervous system. Moreover, neonates have much higher levels of bilirubin in their blood due to:

1. Rapid breakdown of fetal red blood cells immediately before birth, with subsequent replacement by normal adult human red blood cells. This breakdown of fetal red blood cells releases large amounts of bilirubin.
2. Severe hemolytic disease of the newborn. Many children who survive exhibit permanent mental impairment or damage to motor areas of the brain because of precipitation of bilirubin in neurons.
3. Neonates have a limited ability to metabolize and excrete bilirubin. The sole pathway for bilirubin elimination is through the uridine diphosphate glucuronosyltransferase isoform 1A1 (UGT1A1) enzyme, which performs a reaction called "glucuronidation". This reaction adds a large sugar to the bilirubin, which makes the compound more water-soluble, so it can be more readily excreted via the urine and/or the feces. The UGT1A1 enzyme is not active in appreciable amounts until several months after birth. Apparently, this is a developmental compromise since the maternal liver and placenta perform glucuronidation for the fetus.
4. Administration of aspirin or specific antibiotics such as ceftriaxone to neonates and infants. Certain drugs such as aspirin displace bilirubin from serum albumin, thus generating an increased level of free bilirubin which can cross the developing blood–brain barrier, especially within the first month of life. This can lead to kernicterus and be life-threatening.

Bilirubin is known to accumulate in the gray matter of neurological tissue where it exerts direct neurotoxic effects. It appears that its neurotoxicity is due to mass-destruction of neurons by apoptosis and necrosis.

== Risk factors ==
- Premature birth
- Rh incompatibility
- Polycythemia – often present in neonates
- Sulfonamides (e.g., co-trimoxazole) – displaces bilirubin from serum albumin
- Crigler–Najjar syndrome, type I
- G6PD deficiency
- Bruising

Gilbert's syndrome and G6PD deficiency occurring together especially increases the risk for kernicterus.

== Diagnosis ==
Naturally, all neonates are prone to jaundice development due to immaturity of the liver that cannot filter the vast amount of fetal hemoglobin that is rapidly changing to Adult hemoglobin. Therefore, it is recommended to assess all newborns for jaundice.

Kernicterus presents as jaundice and neurological symptoms such as cerebral paresis, gaze palsy and hearing loss. Bilirubin tests needs to be done on newborns as an indirect bilirubin level above 25 mg/dl, is diagnostic for kernicterus. If a newborn's Rh is different from its mother's Rh, then there is Rh incompatibility, which increases the risk of developing kernicterus.

== Prevention ==
Measuring the serum bilirubin is helpful in evaluating a baby's risk for developing kernicterus. These numbers can then be plotted on the Bhutani nomogram. In neonates with hyperbilirubinemia, light therapy may be effective in reducing the serum bilirubin level. More severe cases may require the use of exchange transfusion.

== Treatment ==
Acute bilirubin encephalopathy's treatment in infants begins with phototherapy, where the newborn is exposed to 420-480nm light which helps conjugate bilirubin in the skin to become water-soluble, leaving it able to be excreted in the urine. When especially severe, exchange transfusion can be performed which rapidly lowers serum bilirubin concentrations by exchanging a newborn's blood.

Currently, no effective treatment exists for kernicterus. Future therapies may include neuroregeneration. A handful of patients have undergone deep brain stimulation and experienced some benefit. Drugs such as baclofen, clonazepam, gabapentin, and artane are often used to manage movement disorders associated with kernicterus. Proton pump inhibitors are also used to help with reflux. Cochlear implants and hearing aids can improve the hearing loss that can come with kernicterus (auditory neuropathy – ANSD).
