= Hemolytic disease of the newborn =

Fetal and neonatal alloimmune blood condition

- Other names: HDN, erythroblastosis fetalis
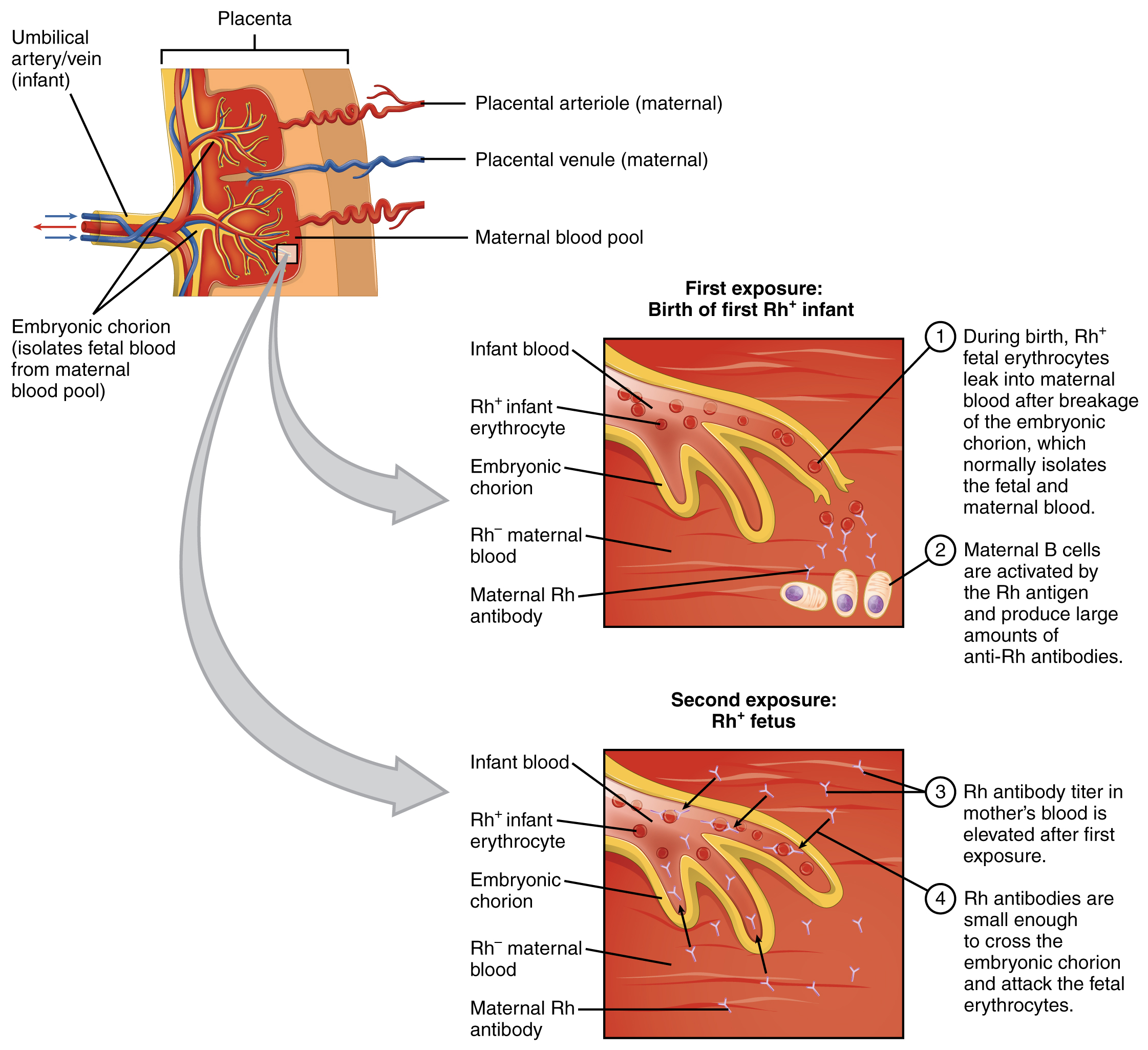
- Specialty: Pediatrics, immunohaematology
- Complications: heart failure, splenomegaly

Hemolytic disease of the newborn (HDN), hemolytic disease of the fetus and newborn (HDFN) or erythroblastosis fetalis, is an alloimmune condition that develops in a fetus at or around birth, when the IgG molecules (one of the five main types of antibodies) produced by the mother pass through the placenta. Among these antibodies are some which attack antigens on the red blood cells in the fetal circulation, breaking down and destroying the cells. The fetus can develop reticulocytosis and anemia. The intensity of this fetal disease ranges from mild to very severe, and fetal death from heart failure (hydrops fetalis) can occur. When the disease is moderate or severe, many erythroblasts (immature red blood cells) are present in the fetal blood, earning these forms of the disease the name erythroblastosis fetalis (British English: erythroblastosis foetalis).

HDFN represents a breach of immune privilege for the fetus or some other form of impairment of the immune tolerance in pregnancy. Various types of HDFN are classified by which alloantigen provokes the response. The types include ABO, anti-RhD, anti-RhE, anti-Rhc, anti-Rhe, anti-RhC, multiantigen combinations, and anti-Kell. Although global prevalence studies of the differential contribution of those types are lacking, regional population studies have shown the anti-RhD type to be the most common cause of HDFN, followed by anti-RhE, anti-RhC, and anti-Rhc.

== Signs and symptoms ==
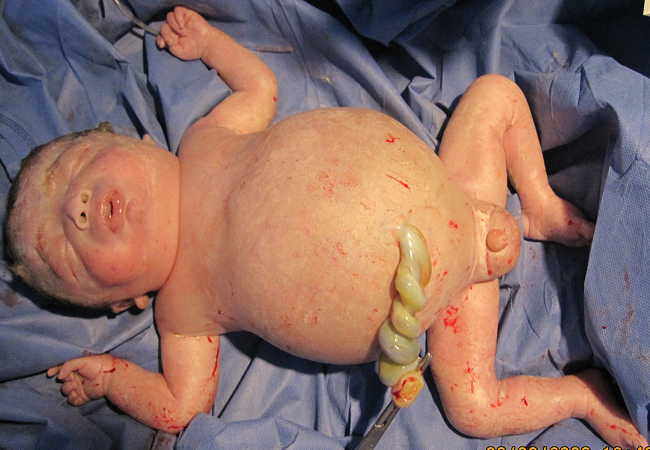
Newborn infant with Rhesus disease, a type of hemolytic disease of the newborn, suffering from hydrops fetalis (edema caused by heart failure). The infant did not survive.

Signs of hemolytic disease of the newborn include a positive direct Coombs test (also called direct agglutination test), elevated cord bilirubin levels, and hemolytic anemia. It is possible for a newborn with this disease to have neutropenia and neonatal alloimmune thrombocytopenia as well. Hemolysis leads to elevated bilirubin levels. After delivery, bilirubin is no longer cleared (via the placenta) from the neonate's blood and the symptoms of jaundice (yellowish skin and yellow discoloration of the whites of the eyes, or icterus) increase within 24 hours after birth. Like other forms of severe neonatal jaundice, there is the possibility of the neonate developing acute or chronic kernicterus, however the risk of kernicterus in HDN is higher because of the rapid and massive destruction of blood cells. Isoimmunization is a risk factor for neurotoxicity and lowers the level at which kernicterus can occur. Untreated profound anemia can cause high-output heart failure, with pallor, enlarged liver and/or spleen, generalized swelling, and respiratory distress.

HDN can be the cause of hydrops fetalis, an often-severe form of prenatal heart failure that causes fetal edema.

=== Complications ===
Complications of HDN could include kernicterus, hepatosplenomegaly, inspissated (thickened or dried) bile syndrome and/or greenish staining of the teeth, hemolytic anemia and damage to the liver due to excess bilirubin. Conditions that may cause similar symptoms in the newborn period include: acquired hemolytic anemia, congenital toxoplasma, congenital syphilis infection, congenital obstruction of the bile duct, and cytomegalovirus (CMV) infection.

- High at birth or rapidly rising bilirubin
- Prolonged hyperbilirubinemia
- Bilirubin Induced Neurological Dysfunction
- Cerebral Palsy
- Kernicterus
- Neutropenia
- Thrombocytopenia
- Hemolytic anemia – must not be treated with iron
- Late onset anemia – must not be treated with iron. Can persist up to 12 weeks after birth.

== Pathophysiology ==
Antibodies are produced when the body is exposed to an antigen foreign to the make-up of the body. If a mother is exposed to a foreign antigen and produces IgG (as opposed to IgM which does not cross the placenta), the IgG will target the antigen, if present in the fetus, and may affect it in utero and persist after delivery. However, the antibodies of the mother do not go away after the first incompatible pregnancy due to immunological memory. The maternal blood is likely to secrete more antibodies and attack the fetal erythrocytes during subsequent pregnancies because of re-exposure to the antigen. The three most common models in which a woman becomes sensitized toward (i.e., produces IgG antibodies against) a particular antigen are hemorrhage, blood transfusion, and ABO incompatibility.

Fetal-maternal hemorrhage, which is the movement of fetal blood cells across the placenta, can occur during abortion, ectopic pregnancy, childbirth, ruptures in the placenta during pregnancy (often caused by trauma), or medical procedures carried out during pregnancy that breach the uterine wall. In subsequent pregnancies, if there is a similar incompatibility in the fetus, these antibodies are then able to cross the placenta into the fetal bloodstream to attach to the red blood cells and cause their destruction (hemolysis). This is a major cause of HDN, because 75% of pregnancies result in some contact between fetal and maternal blood, and 15–50% of pregnancies have hemorrhages with the potential for immune sensitization. The amount of fetal blood needed to cause maternal sensitization depends on the individual's immune system and ranges from 0.1 mL to 30 mL.

The woman may have received a therapeutic blood transfusion. ABO blood group system and the D antigen of the Rhesus (Rh) blood group system typing are routine prior to transfusion. Suggestions have been made that women of child-bearing age or young girls should not be given a transfusion with Rhc-positive blood or Kell_{1}-positive blood to avoid possible sensitization, but this would strain the resources of blood transfusion services, and it is currently considered uneconomical to screen for these blood groups. HDFN can also be caused by antibodies to a variety of other blood group system antigens, but Kell and Rh are the most frequently encountered.

The third sensitization model can occur in women of blood type O. The immune response to A and B antigens, which are widespread in the environment, usually leads to the production of IgM or IgG anti-A and anti-B antibodies early in life. Women of blood type O are more prone than women of types A and B to making IgG anti-A and anti-B antibodies, and these IgG antibodies are able to cross the placenta. For unknown reasons, the incidence of maternal antibodies against type A and B antigens of the IgG type that could potentially cause hemolytic disease of the newborn is greater than the observed incidence of "ABO disease." About 15% of pregnancies involve a type O mother and a type A or type B child; only 3% of these pregnancies result in hemolytic disease due to A/B/O incompatibility. In contrast to antibodies to A and B antigens, production of Rhesus antibodies upon exposure to environmental antigens seems to vary significantly across individuals. In cases where there is ABO incompatibility and Rh incompatibility, the risk of alloimmunization is decreased because fetal red blood cells are removed from maternal circulation due to anti-ABO antibodies before they can trigger an anti-Rh response.

=== Serological types ===
HDN is classified by the type of antigens involved. The main types are ABO HDN, Rhesus HDN, Kell HDN, and other antibodies. Combinations of antibodies (for example, anti-Rhc and anti-RhE occurring together) can be especially severe.

ABO hemolytic disease of the newborn can range from mild to severe, but generally, it is a mild disease. It can be caused by anti-A and anti-B antibodies.

Rhesus D hemolytic disease of the newborn (often called Rh disease) is the most common and only preventable form of severe HDN. Since the introduction of Rho-D immunoglobulin, (Rhogam, at 1968, which prevents the production of maternal Rho-D antibodies, the incidence of anti-D HDN has decreased dramatically.

Rhesus c HDFN can range from a mild to severe disease and is the third most common form of severe HDN. Rhesus e and rhesus C hemolytic disease of the newborn are rare. Anti-C and anti-c can both show a negative DAT but still have a severely affected infant. An indirect Coombs must also be run.

Anti-Kell hemolytic disease of the newborn is most commonly caused by anti-K_{1} antibodies, the second most common form of severe HDN. Over half of the cases of anti-K_{1} related HDN are caused by multiple blood transfusions. Antibodies to the other Kell antigens are rare. Anti-Kell can cause severe anemia regardless of titer. It suppresses the bone marrow by inhibiting the erythroid progenitor cells.

Anti-M also recommends antigen testing to rule out the presence of HDN as the direct coombs can come back negative in a severely affected infant.

Kidd antigens are also present on the endothelial cells of the kidneys.

One study states that it would be unwise to routinely dismiss anti-E as being of little clinical consequence. It also found that the most severe case of anti-E HDFN occurred with titers 1:2, concluding that titers are not reliable for the diagnosis of the anti-E type.

== Diagnosis ==
The diagnosis of HDFN is based on history and laboratory findings. If a newly pregnant woman has red cell antibodies in her serum, the antibody titer should be followed with subsequent blood draws. The titer will rise if the fetus expresses the red cell antigen to which she is alloimmunized. In that case, fetal middle cerebral artery doppler ultrasonography is used to determine the degree of fetal anemia and the need for intrauterine transfusion.

Blood tests done on the newborn baby

- Biochemistry tests for jaundice including total and direct bilirubin levels.
- Complete blood count (CBC), which may show a decreased hemoglobin and hematocrit due to red blood cell destruction
- Reticulocyte count, which will usually be increased as the bone marrow makes new red blood cells to replace the ones that are being destroyed, and a peripheral blood smear to look at cell morphology. In the presence of significant hemolysis the smear will show schistocytes (fragmented red blood cells), reticulocytosis, and in severe cases erythroblasts (also known as nucleated red blood cells).
- Positive direct Coombs test (might be negative after fetal intrauterine blood transfusion)

Blood tests done on the mother

- Positive indirect Coombs test
- Cell free fetal DNA (cff-DNA) from maternal plasma may be used early in pregnancy to determine whether the fetus expresses the red cell antigen to which the pregnant mother is alloimmunized

Blood tests done on the father (rarely needed)

- Erythrocyte antigen status on the father might be a non-preferred alternative, if maternal cff-DNA testing is not available, in conjunction with monitoring the titer of the maternal plasma

== Prevention ==
In cases of Rho(D) incompatibility, Rho(D) immunoglobulin is given to prevent sensitization. However, there is no comparable immunotherapy available for other blood group incompatibilities.

Early pregnancy

- IVIG – IVIG stands for Intravenous Immunoglobulin. It is used in cases of previous loss, high maternal titers, known aggressive antibodies, and in cases where religion prevents blood transfusion. IVIG can be more effective than IUT alone. Fetal mortality was reduced by 36% in the IVIG and IUT group than in the IUT alone group. IVIG and plasmapheresis together can reduce or eliminate the need for an IUT.
- Plasmapheresis – Plasmapheresis aims to decrease the maternal titer by direct plasma replacement and physical removal of antibody. Plasmapheresis and IVIG together can even be used on women with previously hydropic fetuses and fetal losses.

Mid- to late- pregnancy

- IUT – Intrauterine Transfusion (IUT) is done either by intraperitoneal transfusion (IPT) or intravenous transfusion (IVT). IVT is preferred over IPT. IUTs are only done until 35 weeks. After that, the risk of an IUT is greater than the risk from post birth transfusion.
- Steroids – Steroids are sometimes given to the mother before IUTs and early delivery to mature the fetal lungs.
- Phenobarbital – Phenobarbital is sometimes given to the mother to help mature the fetal liver and reduce hyperbilirubinemia.
- Early Delivery – Delivery can occur anytime after the age of viability. Emergency delivery due to failed IUT is possible, along with induction of labor at 35–38 weeks.

Rhesus-negative mothers who are pregnant with a rhesus-positive infant are offered Rho(D) immune globulin (RhIG, or RhoGam) at 28 weeks during pregnancy, at 34 weeks, and within 48 hours after delivery to prevent sensitization to the D antigen. It works by binding any fetal red blood cells with the D antigen before the mother is able to produce an immune response and form anti-D IgG. A drawback to pre-partum administration of RhIG is that it causes a positive antibody screen when the mother is tested, which can be difficult to distinguish from natural immunological responses that result in antibody production. Without Rho(D) immunoglobulin, the risk of isoimmunization is approximately 17%; with proper administration, the risk is reduced to less than 0.1–0.2%.

== After birth testing ==
- Coombs – in certain instances (when there is concern for blood group incompatibility between mother and baby for example), after birth a baby will have a direct Coombs test run to confirm the antibodies attached to the infant's red blood cells. This test is run on the infant's cord blood.

In some cases, the direct Coombs will be negative but severe, even fatal HDN can occur. An indirect Coombs needs to be run in cases of anti-C, anti-c, and anti-M. Infants with Anti-M are also recommended to receive antigen testing to rule out the presence of HDN. The below tests are often useful in cases of hemolytic disease of the newborn but are not required for treatment of all newborns.

- Hgb – the infant's hemoglobin should be tested from cord blood.
- Reticulocyte count – Reticulocytes are elevated when the infant is producing more red blood cells in response to anemia. A rise in the retic count can mean that an infant may not need additional transfusions. Low retic is observed in infants treated with IUT and in those with HDN from anti-Kell.
- Neutrophils – as neutropenia is one of the complications of HDN, the neutrophil count should be checked.
- Thrombocytes – as thrombocytopenia is one of the complications of HDN, the thrombocyte count should be checked.
- Bilirubin should be tested from cord blood.
- Ferritin – because most infants affected by HDN have iron overload, a ferritin must be run before giving the infant any additional iron.
- Newborn Screening Tests – Transfusion with donor blood during pregnancy or shortly after birth can affect the results of the Newborn Screening Tests. It is recommended to wait and retest 10–12 months after last transfusion. In some cases, DNA testing from saliva can be used to rule out certain conditions.

== Treatment ==
After birth, treatment depends on the severity of the condition, but could include temperature stabilization and monitoring, phototherapy, transfusion with compatible packed red blood, exchange transfusion, sodium bicarbonate for correction of acidosis and/or assisted ventilation.

- Phototherapy – Exposure to blue light (400 nm to 480 nm) is recommended when the cord bilirubin is 3 or higher. Some doctors use it at lower levels while awaiting lab results. This converts unconjugated bilirubin to a conjugated form that is easier for the infant to clear.
- IVIG – IVIG has been used to successfully treat many cases of HDN. It has been used not only on anti-D, but on anti-E as well. IVIG can be used to reduce the need for exchange transfusion and to shorten the length of phototherapy. The AAP recommends "In isoimmune hemolytic disease, administration of intravenous γ-globulin (0.5–1 g/kg over 2 hours) is recommended if the TSB (total serum bilirubin) is rising despite intensive phototherapy or the TSB level is within 2 to 3 mg/dL (34–51 μmol/L) of the exchange level. If necessary, this dose can be repeated in 12 hours (evidence quality B: benefits exceed harms). Intravenous γ-globulin has been shown to reduce the need for exchange transfusions in Rh and ABO hemolytic disease."
- Exchange transfusion – Exchange transfusion is used when bilirubin reaches either the high or medium risk lines on the nonogram provided by the American Academy of Pediatrics (Figure 4). Cord bilirubin >4 is also indicative of the need for exchange transfusion.

== Transfusion reactions ==
Once a woman has antibodies, she is at high risk for a future transfusion reaction if she is in need of a blood transfusion. For this reason, she is advised to carry a medical alert card at all times and inform all doctors and emergency personnel of her antibody status. The absence of antibodies however does not preclude a woman from having a transfusion reaction:

"Acute hemolytic transfusion reactions may be either immune-mediated or nonimmune-mediated. Immune-mediated hemolytic transfusion reactions caused by immunoglobulin M (IgM) anti-A, anti-B, or anti-A, B typically result in severe, potentially fatal complement-mediated intravascular hemolysis. Immune-mediated hemolytic reactions caused by IgG, Rh, Kell, Duffy, or other non-ABO antibodies typically result in extravascular sequestration, shortened survival of transfused red cells, and relatively mild clinical reactions. Acute hemolytic transfusion reactions due to immune hemolysis may occur in patients who have no antibodies detectable by routine laboratory procedures."

For a summary of transfusion reactions in the US, see reference.

== Epidemiology ==
In 2003, the incidence of Rh(D) sensitization in the United States was 6.8 per 1000 live births; 0.27% of women with an Rh incompatible fetus experience alloimmunization.

== See also ==
- Exchange transfusion
- Hemolytic disease of the newborn (ABO)
- Hemolytic disease of the newborn (anti-Kell)
- Hemolytic disease of the newborn (anti-Rhc)
- Hemolytic disease of the newborn (anti-RhE)
- Neonatal isoerythrolysis
- Neonatal red cell transfusion
- Rh disease
