= Kell antigen system =

Human blood group classification

The Kell antigen system (also known as the Kell–Cellano system) is a human blood group system, that is, a group of antigens on the human red blood cell surface which are important determinants of blood type and are targets for autoimmune or alloimmune diseases which destroy red blood cells. The Kell antigens are K, k, Kp^{a}, Kp^{b}, Kp^{c}, Js^{a}, Js^{b}, Wk^{a}, Cote and other variants. The Kell antigens are peptides found within the Kell blood group glycoprotein, a 93-kilodalton transmembrane zinc-dependent endopeptidase which is encoded by the gene KEL, and is responsible for cleaving endothelin-3.

== Protein ==
The KEL gene encodes a type II transmembrane glycoprotein that is the highly polymorphic Kell blood group antigen. The Kell glycoprotein links via a single disulfide bond to the XK membrane protein that carries the Kx antigen. The encoded protein contains sequence and structural similarity to members of the neprilysin (M13) family of zinc endopeptidases.

There are several alleles of the gene which creates Kell protein. Two such alleles, K_{1} (Kell) and K_{2} (Cellano), are the most common. The kell protein is tightly bound to a second protein, XK, by a disulfide bond. Absence of the XK protein (such as through genetic deletion or through a single point mutation within the coding region of the XK gene), leads to marked reduction of the Kell antigens on the red blood cell surface. Absence of the Kell protein (K_{0}), however, does not affect the XK protein.

The Kell protein has also recently been designated CD238 (cluster of differentiation 238).

== Disease association ==
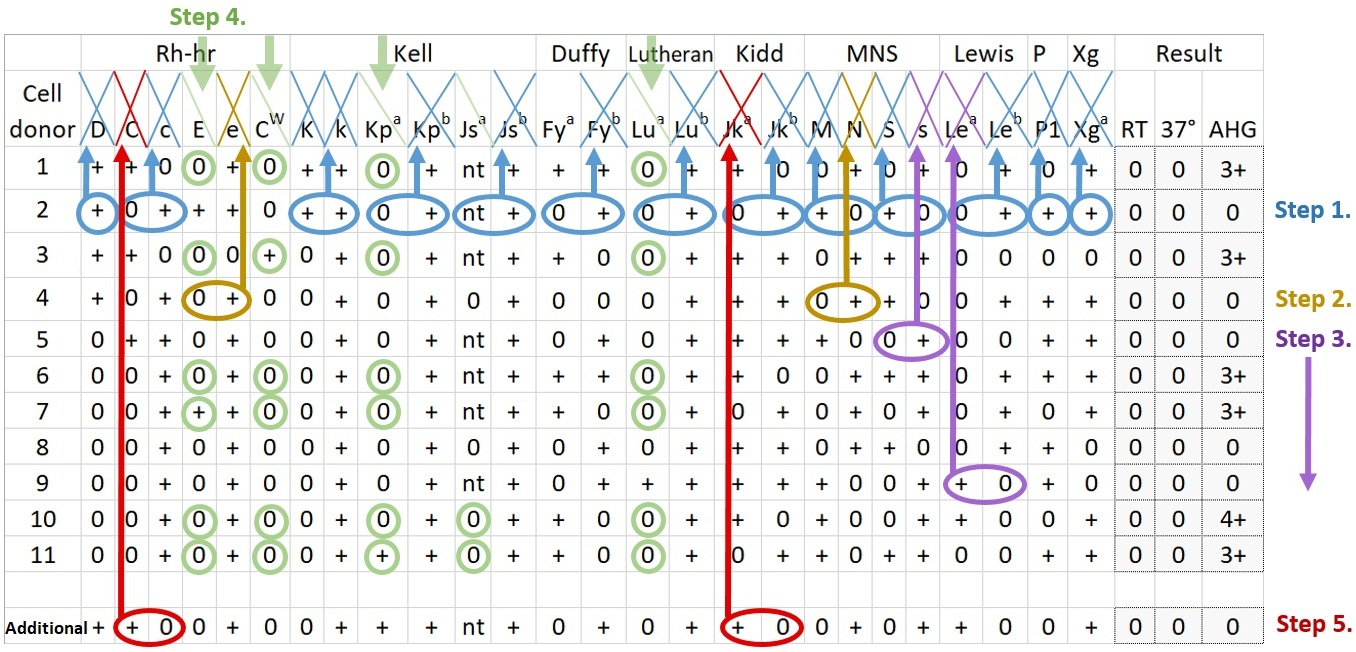
Interpretation of antibody panel to detect patient antibodies towards the most relevant human blood group systems, including Kell.

Kell antigens are important in transfusion medicine, autoimmune hemolytic anemia and hemolytic disease of the newborn (anti-Kell). Anti-K is the next most common immune red cell antibody after those in the ABO and Rh system. Anti-K typically presents as IgG class alloantibody. Individuals lacking a specific Kell antigen may develop antibodies against Kell antigens when transfused with blood containing that antigen. This is particularly true for the "K" antigen which shows a relatively high antigenicity and moderately low frequency (~9%) in Caucasian populations. Anti-K can also occur following transplacental hemorrhage associated with childbirth making Kell an important concern for hemolytic disease of the newborn. Following the formation of anti-K, subsequent blood transfusions may be marked by destruction of the new cells by these antibodies, a process known as hemolysis. Anti-K does not bind complement, therefore hemolysis is extravascular. Individuals without K antigens(K_{0}) who have formed an antibody to a K antigen, must be transfused with blood from donors who are also K_{0} to prevent hemolysis.

Autoimmune hemolytic anemia (AIHA) occurs when the body produces an antibody against a blood group antigen on its own red blood cells. The antibodies lead to destruction of the red blood cells with resulting anemia. Similarly, a pregnant woman may develop antibodies against fetal red blood cells, resulting in destruction, anemia, and hydrops fetalis in a process known as hemolytic disease of the newborn (HDN). Both AIHA and HDN may be severe when caused by anti-Kell antibodies, as they are the most immunogenic antigens after those of the ABO and Rhesus blood group systems.

== McLeod phenotype ==
McLeod phenotype (or McLeod syndrome) is an X-linked anomaly of the Kell blood group system in which Kell antigens are poorly detected by laboratory tests. The McLeod gene encodes the XK protein, a protein with structural characteristics of a membrane transport protein but of unknown function. The XK appears to be required for proper synthesis or presentation of the Kell antigens on the red blood cell surface.

== Other associations ==
Evidence supports a genetic link between the Kell blood group (on chromosome 7 q33) and the ability to taste phenylthiocarbamide, or PTC, a bitter-tasting thiourea compound. Bitter taste receptor proteins in the taste buds of the tongue that recognise PTC are encoded on nearby chromosome locus 7 q35-6.

== Clinical diagnostic ==
Clinical testing in patient care for Kell antigens follows published minimum quality and operational requirements, similar to red cell genotyping for any of the other recognized blood group systems. Molecular analysis can identify gene variants (alleles) that may affect Kell antigens expression on the red cell membrane.

== History ==
The Kell group was named after the first patient described with antibodies to K_{1}, a pregnant woman named Mrs. Kelleher in 1945. Mrs. Cellano was likewise a pregnant woman with the first described antibodies to K_{2}. The K_{0} phenotype was first described in 1957 and the McLeod phenotype was found in Hugh McLeod, a Harvard dental student, in 1961. King Henry VIII of England may have had Kell-positive blood type, explaining the deaths of seven of his ten children at, or soon after, birth, supported by the revelation that Henry may have inherited Kell from his maternal great-grandmother, Jacquetta of Luxembourg. Alternatively he may have had McLeod syndrome, explaining his mental deterioration around age 40.
