= Rh disease =

Blood disease of the fetus and newborn

- Other names: Rhesus isoimmunization, Rh (D) disease, rhesus incompatibility
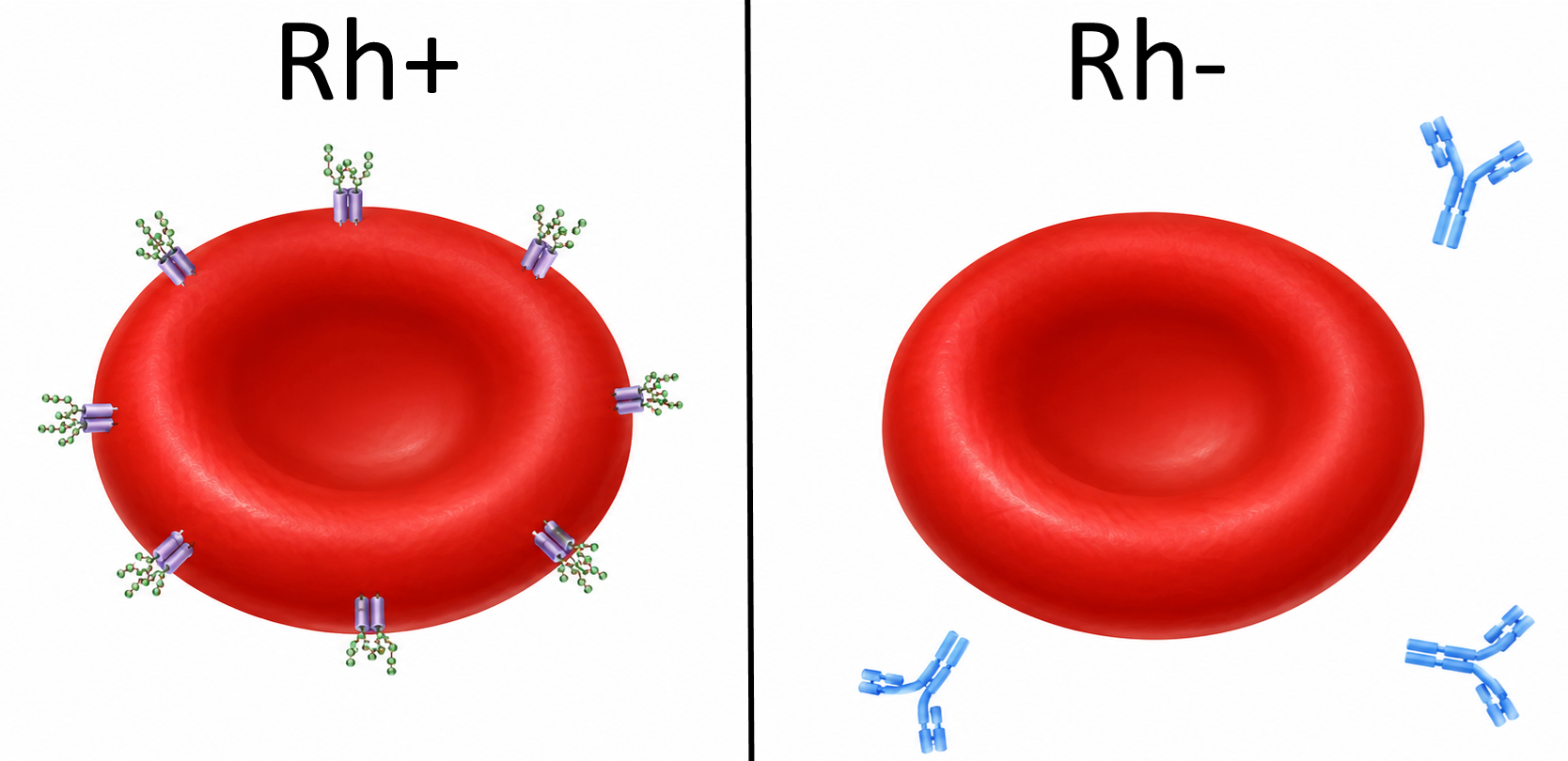
- Rh-positive individuals have red blood cells with the Rh antigen (left) while Rh-negative individuals do not but will have antibodies against the antigen (right).
- Specialty: Paediatrics, haematology, transfusion medicine
- Causes: Incompatibility between mother antibodies and fetal Rhesus factor
- Diagnostic method: Blood compatibility testing, sonography, physical assessment
- Prevention: Administration of antibody therapy to the mother
- Treatment: Prophylactic antibody therapy, intrauterine transfusion
- Medication: Rh_{o}(D) immune globulin
- Frequency: (of maternal–fetal blood incompatibilities) 16% without antibody therapy, 0.1% with therapy

Rh disease (also known as rhesus isoimmunization, Rh (D) disease, or rhesus incompatibility, and blue baby disease) is a type of hemolytic disease of the fetus and newborn (HDFN). The term "Rh disease" is commonly used to refer to HDFN as prior to the discovery of anti-Rh_{o}(D) immune globulin, it was the most common type of HDFN. The disease ranges from mild to severe, and occurs in the second or subsequent pregnancies of Rh-D negative women when the biological father is Rh-D positive due to the presence of anti-D antibodies (the D antigen being only one of more than 50 in the Rh complex).

Due to several advances in modern medicine HDFN can be prevented by treating the mother during pregnancy and soon after delivery with an injection of anti-Rh_{o}(D) immune globulin (Rhoclone, Rhogam, AntiD). With successful mitigation of this disease by prevention through the use of anti-Rh_{o}(D) immune globulin, other antibodies are more commonly the cause of HDFN today.

== Mechanism ==
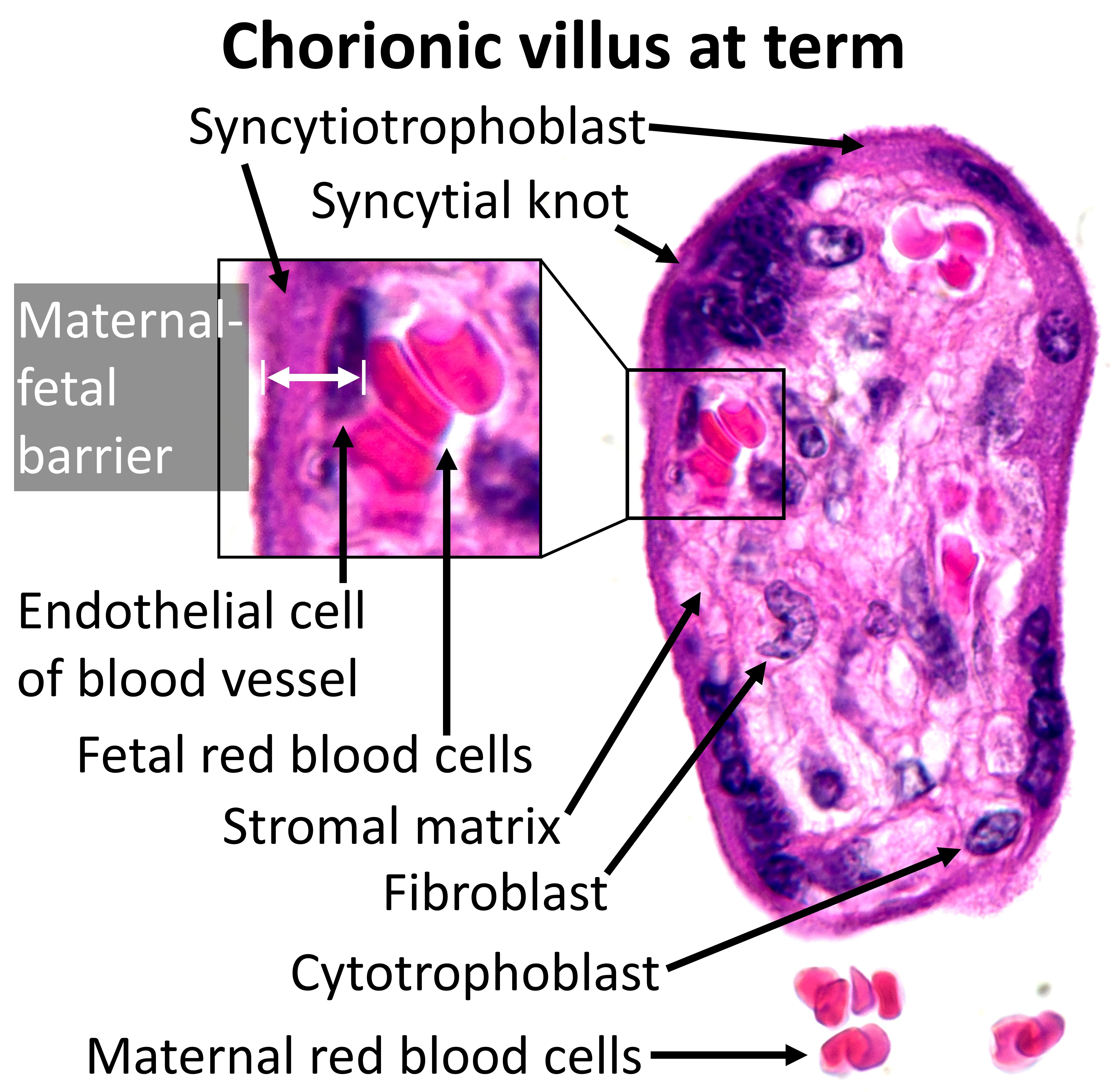
High-magnification H&E micrograph of a chorionic villus of the placenta at term with main cell types. Insert shows the maternal-fetal barrier that mainly consists of syncytiotrophoblast and endothelial cells, keeping fetal blood separate from the surrounding maternal blood while letting oxygen and nutrients pass through. This is the barrier that normally keeps fetal blood cells away from the maternal immune system so that no maternal antibodies are produced against the fetal blood cells.

During pregnancy, there is normally a barrier between maternal and fetal blood called the placenta, a temporary organ that connects a mother's uterus to the umbilical cord to provide nutrients and oxygen to the fetus. However, in certain circumstances, small amounts of fetal blood cells may enter the mother's circulation. Certain types of events where this occurs are during childbirth, miscarriage or abortion, trauma, and invasive procedures such as amniocentesis. Once the fetal Rh-positive red blood cells enter the bloodstream of a Rh-negative mother, they are recognized as foreign. The mother's immune system reacts to the Rh-positive red blood cells the same way that it would respond to something like a virus or bacteria, activating B cells—a type of white blood cell that is key to the triggering of an immune response. These activated B cells then differentiate into plasma cells, which produce anti-D antibodies. After the primary exposure, some of these B cells become memory cells that remember the original exposure, and produce IgG antibodies, which are smaller and can cross the placental barrier. Once they cross this barrier into the fetal bloodstream, they bind to fetal Rh-positive cells, triggering opsonization, which marks the red blood cells for destruction. The fetal spleen and liver then begin to break down those red blood cells, thinking that they are a foreign invader when in reality they are just mismatched.

== Signs and symptoms ==
Symptoms of Rh disease include yellowish amniotic fluid and enlarged spleen, liver or heart or buildup of fluid in the abdomen of the fetus.

== Pathophysiology ==
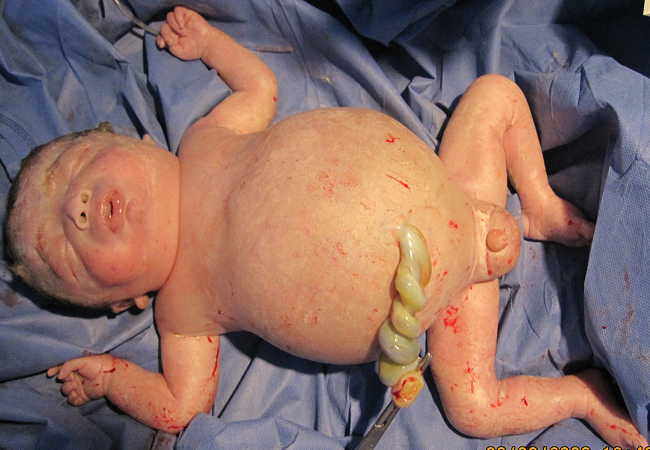
Newborn infant with severe Rhesus disease, suffering from hydrops fetalis. The infant did not survive.

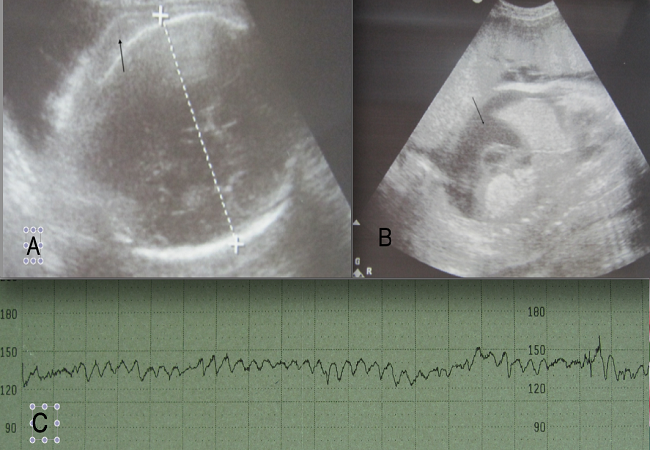
Ultrasound images and electrocardiogram of an infant with hydrops fetalis as the result of severe Rh disease. A) Ultrasound image of the fetal head showing scalp edema (arrow); (B) ultrasound image showing high abundance ascites (arrow) on a sagittal section of the abdomen; (C) Sinusoidal type fetal heart rate recording

During the first pregnancy, the Rh− mother's initial exposure to fetal Rh+ red blood cells (RBCs) is usually not sufficient to activate her Rh-recognizing B cells. However, during delivery, the placenta separates from the uterine wall, causing umbilical cord blood to enter the maternal circulation, which results in the mother's proliferation of IgM-secreting plasma B cells to eliminate the fetal Rh+ cells from her blood stream. IgM antibodies do not cross the placental barrier, which is why no effects to the fetus are seen in first pregnancies for Rh-D mediated disease. However, in subsequent pregnancies with Rh+ fetuses, the IgG memory B cells mount an immune response when re-exposed, and these IgG anti-Rh(D) antibodies do cross the placenta and enter fetal circulation. These antibodies are directed against the Rhesus (Rh) factor, a protein found on the surface of the fetal RBCs. The antibody-coated RBCs are destroyed by IgG antibodies binding and activating complement pathways.

The resulting anemia has multiple sequelae:

1. The immature haematopoietic system of the fetus is taxed as the liver and spleen attempt to put immature RBCs into circulation (erythroblasts, thus the previous name for this disease erythroblastosis fetalis).
2. As the liver and spleen enlarge under this unexpected demand for RBCs, a condition called portal hypertension develops, and this taxes the immature heart and circulatory system.
3. Liver enlargement and the prolonged need for RBC production results in decreased ability to make other proteins, such as albumin, and this decreases the plasma colloid osmotic pressure (the fluid-retaining ability of blood plasma) leading to leakage of fluid into tissues and body cavities, termed hydrops fetalis.
4. The severe anemia taxes the heart to compensate by increasing output in an effort to deliver oxygen to the tissues and results in a condition called high output cardiac failure.
5. If left untreated, the result may be fetal death.

The destruction of RBCs leads to elevated bilirubin levels (hyperbilirubinemia) as a byproduct. This is not generally a problem during pregnancy, as the maternal circulation can compensate. However, once the infant is delivered, the immature system is not able to handle this amount of bilirubin alone and jaundice or kernicterus (bilirubin deposition in the brain) can develop which may lead to brain damage or death. Sensitizing events during pregnancy include c-section, miscarriage, therapeutic abortion, amniocentesis, ectopic pregnancy, abdominal trauma and external cephalic version. However, in many cases there was no apparent sensitizing event. Approximately 50% of Rh-D positive infants with circulating anti-D are either unaffected or only mildly affected requiring no treatment at all and only monitoring. An additional 20% are severely affected and require transfusions while still in the uterus. This pattern is similar to other types of HDFN due to other commonly encountered antibodies (anti-c, anti-K, and Fy(a)).

== Diagnosis ==
=== Maternal blood ===
In the United States, it is a standard of care to test all expecting mothers for the presence or absence of the RhD protein on their RBCs. However, when medical care is unavailable or prenatal care not given for any other reason, the window to prevent the disease may be missed. In addition, there is more widespread use of molecular techniques to avoid missing women who appear to be Rh-D positive but are actually missing portions of the protein or have hybrid genes creating altered expression of the protein and still at risk of HDFN due to Anti-D.

- At the first prenatal visit, the mother is typed for ABO blood type and the presence or absence of RhD using a method sensitive enough to detect weaker versions of this antigen (known as weak-D) and a screen for antibodies is performed.
  - If she is negative for RhD protein expression and has not formed anti-D already, she is a candidate for RhoGam prophylaxis to prevent alloimmunization.
  - If she is positive for anti-D antibodies, the pregnancy will be followed with monthly titers (levels) of the antibody to determine if any further intervention is needed.
- A screening test to detect for the presence or absence of fetal cells can help determine if a quantitative test (Kleihauer-Betke or flow cytometry) is needed. This is done when exposure is suspected due to a potential sensitizing event (such as a car accident or miscarriage).
- If the screening test is positive or the appropriate dose of RhoGam needs to be determined, a quantitative test is performed to determine a more precise amount of fetal blood to which the mother has been exposed.
  - The Kleihauer–Betke test or flow cytometry on a maternal blood sample are the most common ways to determine this, and the appropriate dose of RhoGam is calculated based on this information.
- There are also emerging tests using Cell-free DNA. Blood is taken from the mother, and using PCR, can detect fetal DNA. This blood test is non-invasive to the fetus and can help determine the risk of HDFN. Testing has proven very accurate and is routinely done in the UK at the International Blood Group Reference Laboratory in Bristol.

=== Paternal blood ===
Blood is generally drawn from the biological father to help determine fetal antigen status. If he is homozygous for the antigen, there is a 100% chance of all offspring in the pairing to be positive for the antigen and at risk for HDFN. If he is heterozygous, there is a 50% chance of offspring to be positive for the antigen.

== Prevention ==
The protection that is offered today against Rh incompatibility involved preventive measures that primarily utilize Rh immunoglobulin, also known as RhoGAM. The aim of these treatments are to prevent the mother's immune system from becoming sensitized to the Rh antigen, which reduces the risk of hemolytic disease in future pregnancies. RhoGAM, Rh immunoglobulin administration, is a product that contains antibodies to the Rh(D) antigen; it is used to prevent the mother from developing an immune response to fetal red blood cells. RhIg 'coats' any Rh-positive fetal red blood cells that enter the mother's bloodstream, effectively 'hiding' them from the mother's immune system. RhoGAM is typically administered at around 28 weeks of pregnancy, then again within 72 hours after childbirth. It is also given during other events that happen during pregnancy like miscarriages, ectopic pregnancies, amniocentesis, and abdominal trauma.

In Arar, Saudi Arabia, results of a study showed that women had a low level of knowledge regarding maternal–fetal blood incompatibility (about 38% of the studied mothers during the research had knowledge about Rh incompatibility). Regarding their knowledge about anti-D, researchers found that 68.5% of the mothers had knowledge about it, while only 51% of the mothers had knowledge about the administration of prophylactic anti D after delivery.

== Management ==
=== Antenatal ===
- Routine prenatal labs drawn at the beginning of every pregnancy include a blood type and an antibody screen. Mothers who are Rh negative (A−, B−, AB−, or O− blood types) and have anti-D antibodies (found on the antibody screen) need to determine the fetus's Rh antigen. If the fetus is also Rh negative (A−, B−, AB−, or O− blood types) then the pregnancy can be managed like any other pregnancy. The anti-D antibodies are only dangerous to Rh positive fetuses (A+, B+, AB+, or O+ blood types).
  - The fetal Rh can be screened using non-invasive prenatal testing (NIPT). This test can screen for the fetus's Rh antigen (positive or negative) at the 10th week of gestation using a blood sample drawn from the mother. The Unity test uses NGS technology to look for Rh alleles (genes) in the cell free fetal DNA in the maternal bloodstream. In healthy pregnancies, at least 5% (fetal fraction) of the cell free DNA in the maternal bloodstream comes from the fetus (placenta cells shed DNA into the maternal bloodstream). This small fraction of cell free DNA from the fetus is enough to determine the fetus's Rh antigen.
- Once a woman has been found to have made anti-D (or any clinically significant antibody against fetal red cells), she is followed as a high risk pregnancy with serial blood draws to determine the next steps.
- Once the titer of anti-D reaches a certain threshold (normally 8 to 16), serial Doppler ultrasound examinations are performed to detect signs of fetal anemia.
  - Detection of increased blood flow velocities in the fetus are a surrogate marker for fetal anemia that may require more invasive intervention.
- If the flow velocity is found to be elevated a determination of the severity of anemia needs to ensue to determine if an intrauterine transfusion is necessary.
  - This is normally done with a procedure called percutaneous umbilical cord blood sampling (PUBS or cordocentesis).
- Intrauterine blood transfusion
  - Intraperitoneal transfusion—blood transfused into fetal abdomen
  - Intravascular transfusion—blood transfused into fetal umbilical vein—This is the method of choice since the late 1980s, and more effective than intraperitoneal transfusion. A sample of fetal blood can be taken from the umbilical vein prior to the transfusion.
  - Often, this is all done at the same PUBS procedure to avoid the needs for multiple invasive procedures with each transfusion.

=== Postnatal ===
- Phototherapy for neonatal jaundice in mild disease
- Exchange transfusion if the neonate has moderate or severe disease
- Intravenous immunoglobulin (IVIG) can be used to reduce the need for exchange transfusion and to shorten the length of phototherapy.

== History ==
In 1939, Philip Levine and Rufus E. Stetson published their findings about a 25-year-old mother who had a stillborn baby who died of hemolytic disease of the newborn. Both parents were blood group O, so the husband's blood was used to give his wife a blood transfusion due to blood loss during delivery. However, she had a severe transfusion reaction. Since both parents were blood group O, which was believed to be compatible for transfusion, they concluded that there must be a previously undiscovered blood group antigen that was present on the husband's RBCs but not present on his wife's. This suggested for the first time that a mother could make blood group antibodies because of immune sensitization to her fetus's RBCs, as her only previous exposure would be the earlier pregnancy. They did not name this blood group antigen at the time, which is why the discovery of the rhesus blood type is credited to Karl Landsteiner and Alexander S. Wiener with their first publication of their tables for blood-typing and cross-matching in 1940, which was the culmination of years of work. There were multiple participants in this scientific race and publications on this topic. Levine published his theory that the disease known as erythroblastosis fetalis was due to Rh alloimmunization in 1941, while Landsteiner and Wiener published their method to type patients for an antibody causing transfusion reactions, known as "Rh".

The first treatment for Rh disease was an exchange transfusion invented by Wiener and later refined by Harry Wallerstein. Approximately 50,000 infants received this treatment. Yet, this could treat the disease only after it took root and did nothing to prevent the disease. In 1960, Ronald Finn, in Liverpool, England, proposed that the disease might be prevented by injecting the at-risk mother with an antibody against fetal red blood cells (anti-RhD). William Pollack, (an immunologist and protein chemist at Ortho Pharmaceutical Corporation) and John Gorman (blood bank director at Columbia-Presbyterian) with Vincent Freda (an obstetrician at Columbia-Presbyterian Medical Center) came to the same realization in New York City. The three of them determined to prove it by injecting a group of male prisoners at Sing Sing Correctional Facility with antibody provided by Ortho, obtained by a fractionation technique developed by Pollack.

Animal studies had been conducted by Pollack using a rabbit model of Rh. This model, named the rabbit HgA-F system, was an animal model of human Rh, and enabled Pollack's team to gain experience in preventing hemolytic disease in rabbits by giving specific HgA antibody, as was later done with Rh-negative mothers. One of the needs was a dosing experiment that could be used to determine the level of circulating Rh-positive cells in an Rh-negative pregnant female derived from her Rh-positive fetus. This was first done in the rabbit system, and human tests at the University of Manitoba conducted under Pollack's direction confirmed that anti-Rh_{o}(D) immune globulin could prevent alloimmunization during pregnancy.

Marianne Cummins was the first at-risk woman to receive a prophylactic injection of anti-Rh_{o}(D) immune globulin (RhIG) after its regulatory approval. Clinical trials were set up in 42 centers in the US, Great Britain, Germany, Sweden, Italy, and Australia. RHIG was finally approved in the United Kingdom and the United States in 1968. The FDA approved the drug under the brand name RhoGAM, with a fixed dose of 300 μg, to be given within three days (72 hours) postpartum. Subsequently, a broader peripartum period was approved for dosing which included prophylaxis during pregnancy. Within a year, the antibody had been injected with great success into more than 500,000 women. Time magazine picked it as one of the top ten medical achievements of the 1960s. By 1973, it was estimated that in the US, more than 50,000 babies' lives had been saved. The use of Rh immune globulin to prevent the disease in babies of Rh negative mothers has become standard practice, and the disease, which once claimed the lives of 10,000 babies yearly in the US, has been virtually eradicated in the developed world. In 1980, Cyril Clarke, Ronald Finn, John G. Gorman, Vincent Freda, and William Pollack each received an Albert Lasker Award for Clinical Medical Research for their work on rhesus blood types and the prevention of Rh disease.

== See also ==
- James Harrison (blood donor) – Australian who donated blood over 1150 times to save babies with Rh disease
