= Percutaneous umbilical cord blood sampling =

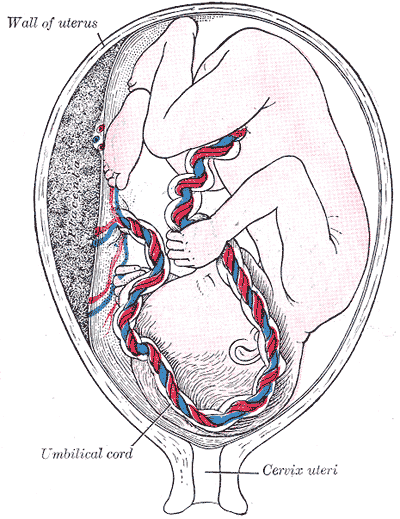
- Other names: Fetal blood sampling
- MeSH: D017218

Percutaneous umbilical cord blood sampling (PUBS), also called cordocentesis, fetal blood sampling, or umbilical vein sampling is a diagnostic genetic test that examines blood from the fetal umbilical cord to detect fetal abnormalities. Fetal and maternal blood supply are typically connected in utero with one vein and two arteries to the fetus. The umbilical vein is responsible for delivering oxygen rich blood to the fetus from the mother; the umbilical arteries are responsible for removing oxygen poor blood from the fetus. This allows for the fetus’ tissues to properly perfuse. PUBS provides a means of rapid chromosome analysis and is useful when information cannot be obtained through amniocentesis, chorionic villus sampling, or ultrasound (or if the results of these tests were inconclusive); this test carries a significant risk of complication and is typically reserved for pregnancies determined to be at high risk for genetic defect. It has been used with mothers with immune thrombocytopenic purpura.

== History ==
PUBS is a type of fetal blood sampling which was originally developed to determine the presence of hereditary abnormalities. Currently, it can detect a number of abnormalities including pH levels, oxygen levels, chromosomal issues, and infections. In 1958, James L.S. recognised that umbilical cord blood gas analysis can give an indication of preceding fetal hypoxic stress. It has since become widely accepted that umbilical cord blood gas analysis can provide important information about the past, present and possibly the future condition of the infant. PUBS dates back to 1964 when Freda and Adamsons reported the removal of a uterus containing a fetus who had a buildup of fluid and ended up dying; however, this was one of the first procedures that showed promise for current day PUBS. Valenti hypothesized in 1972 that the procedure he used to obtain fetal tissue could be used to obtain fetal blood, and in 1973, he was able to sample fetal vessels; fetoscopy was used and refined between 1974 and 1983 as a prenatal test to determine fetal status as well as obtain fetal blood and perform transfusions in some cases. Fetoscopy is a procedure in which a device is inserted through the abdomen of the mother in order to visualize the fetus. The first documented use of PUBS came in 1983 by Daffos and colleagues who sampled blood from an umbilical vein with a needle and monitored its maneuvers with an ultrasound. PUBS has presented a more successful and less dangerous alternative to fetoscopy, which had a miscarriage risk of 5-10%. With the development of modern medicine and new techniques, PUBS is not used often except when rapid diagnosis and decisions must be made in regards to the fetus and suspected abnormalities suspected. PUBS has been predominantly replaced by fluorescence in situ hybridization (FISH) which is a more detailed investigation of chromosomal abnormalities.

== Procedure ==
If the fetus is viable, the procedure is performed close to an operating room in case an emergency cesarean section is necessary due to complications caused by the procedure. Currently, there is no definite age of viability because this depends on the fetus’ ability to survive outside the womb, which in cases of premature births, can depend on access to medical care and technology needed to keep the fetus alive through the neonatal stage. Fetal viability typically occurs at about 24 to 25 weeks of gestation. When the fetus is in between the ages of 24–34 weeks, a glucocorticoid is given to the patient about 24 hours before the procedure to stimulate lung maturity. An ultrasound is performed before the procedure to view the position of the fetus and may be used during the procedure to help guide the needle. The mother’s blood is drawn for comparison against fetal blood, and intravenous access is established in the mother in order to supply medications as needed. To reduce the risk of intraamniotic infection, antibiotics are supplied through the intravenous access about 30–60 minutes before the procedure. If movement of the fetus is a risk to the success of the procedure, the fetus may be paralyzed using a fetal paralytic drug.

This image shows anterior blood sampling from the umbilical cord.

This image shows posterior blood sampling from the umbilical cord.

A 20 or 22 gauge spinal needle is typically used in PUBS and may be prepared with an anticoagulant, which helps to reduce the risk of clot formation. During the procedure, the first step is to locate a relatively stable segment of the umbilical cord. A typical sampling site would be where the segment of the umbilical cord is closest to the placenta. However, there is a risk of maternal blood contamination at this site. Blood sampling may be achieved with more ease if the placenta is in the anterior position. However, if the placenta is in the posterior position, the fetus might block direct access to the umbilical cord. Once the umbilical cord is reached and the correct position of the needle is confirmed, the fetal blood is drawn. The needle is removed after all necessary samples are taken. The site of puncture is monitored after the procedure for bleeding. Also, if the fetus is viable, fetal heart rate is monitored post-procedure for one to two hours.

After the blood samples are obtained, they are placed into tubes containing anticoagulants in order to stop the blood from clotting. If the blood sample was obtained at the site close to the placenta, a fetal blood confirmation test should be done to ensure no mixing of fetal and maternal blood occurred before the diagnostic tests are done on the blood. Fetal red blood cells (RBC) are usually bigger than maternal RBCs, and the average volume of RBCs, the mean corpuscular volume (MCV), is one of the methods used to determine whether or not the fetal blood has been contaminated. Another method, human chorionic gonadotropin (hCG) determination, can detect maternal blood because maternal blood has high levels of hCG. The hemoglobin alkaline denaturation test (Apt test) can detect the presence of maternal blood, which is indicated by a color change from red to brown when the sample is added to alkali reagent. Blood typing would also detect maternal blood, as the I antigen only occurs in adults. The Kleihauer–Betke test can detect very small amounts of maternal blood before the third trimester of pregnancy by monitoring hemoglobin elution in acid because adult and fetal hemoglobin elute differently in acid. Finally, a white blood cell count can detect maternal blood in the sample, as fetal white blood cells are primarily leukocytes, while maternal white blood cells are mostly neutrophils. If amniotic fluid infiltrated the sample, then there would be a reduction in the volume of RBCs, white blood cells, and platelets in the sample. Also, patterns consistent with amniotic fluid would be visible in the sample.

== Associated risks ==
The most common complication is a hemorrhage, or bleeding, of the puncture site and can be especially dangerous when the fetus is younger than 21 weeks. The risk of hemorrhage is greater if the fetus has a defect that affects its platelets. A transfusion of donor platelets is usually done in such cases to reduce the risk of bleeding. If the bleeding is severe, immediate delivery is an option as long as the fetus is old enough to survive, or fetal blood volume restoration may be considered. Another possible complication is cord hematoma, which doesn’t have any characteristic symptoms but can be indicated by sudden bradycardia. If the hematoma is under control, the fetus is monitored until stabilized. If the fetus remains unstable, a delivery may be done. Fetomaternal hemorrhage is another complication that occurs when the fetal blood mixes into the maternal blood. A small fetomaternal hemorrhage could cause an increase in maternal antigens, while a large fetomaternal hemorrhage could cause fetal anemia and death. Fetal bradycardia, low heart rate, is another complication that may occur. Most cases of fetal bradycardia are self-resolved within five minutes. The complication of infection has a low incidence rate, and preventative measures are implemented against the risk of infection, such as antibiotic usage and the aseptic technique. However, vertical transmission of a virus such as HIV may occur. Fetal loss may also occur, especially in the presence of several risk factors, including fetal abnormalities, operator errors, placental penetration, and viability of the fetus.

Intrahepatic vein fetal blood sampling may be done as an alternative to PUBS. It involves the needle being inserted into the intrahepatic part of the umbilical cord in the fetal abdomen. The benefits of this alternative, compared to PUBS, are that chances of contamination of the fetal blood are very low, the risk of fetomaternal hemorrhage are reduced, the risk of bleeding from the sampling site is reduced, and access to the sampling site is easy regardless of the position of the placenta. In pregnancies with high risk of fetal thrombocytopenia, this is the preferred method of blood samples due to the very low risk of site bleeding.

== Indications and contraindications ==
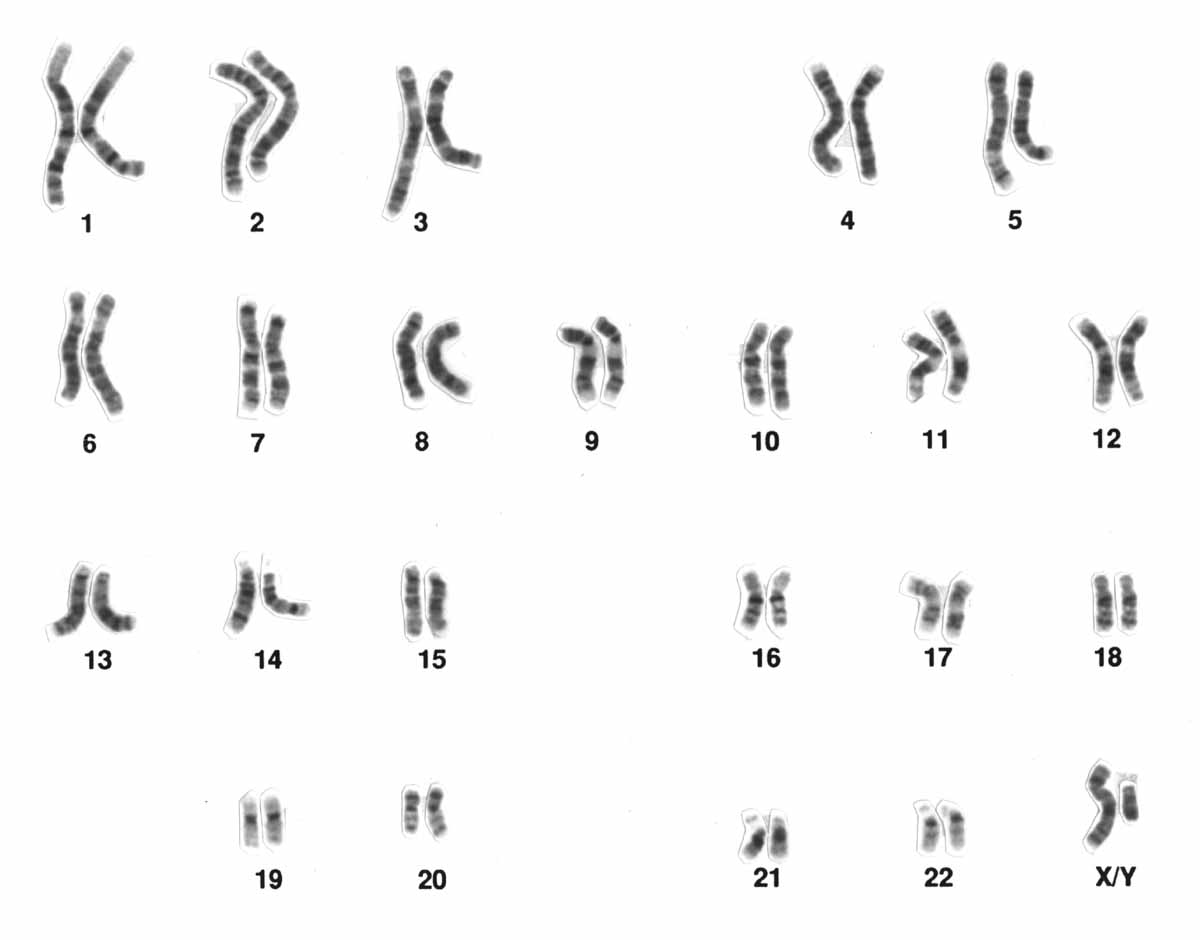
Human male karyotpe high resolution

PUBS is not a diagnostic test that is indicated in every pregnancy. It is, however, suggested in pregnancy cases in which the blood gas levels and pH would aid in diagnosis of a condition, such as anemia, or delivery plan, if termination of the pregnancy is being considered or special plans must be made. Umbilical cord blood gas analysis may assist with clinical management and excludes the diagnosis of birth asphyxia in approximately 80% of depressed newborns at term. Severe fetal growth issues in conjunction with low oxygen in the fetus’ blood and high levels in the mother’s blood also indicate the use of PUBS. With more detailed observations and information on fetal tissue perfusion and metabolism, better predictions on development can be made. For pregnancies in which genetic abnormalities may be present, PUBS can be used to construct a karyotype, usually within 48 hours, and detect irregular chromosomal patterns. Karyotypes are able to confirm or detect monosomies, trisomies, or missing portions of chromosomes to give a detailed picture of the severity of the genetic defect as well as predicting developmental future. PUBS is also indicated in the cases of twins with accumulation of amniotic fluid and substantially different growth rates (at least 10%), if the fetus is expected to be breaking down red blood cells improperly, and in the alleviation of hydrops fetalis, a build-up of fluid in at least 2 parts of the fetus. Suspicion of fetal infections, such as rubella and toxoplasmosis, as well as the need to supply medicine or blood transfusions to the fetus are indications for the use of PUBS.

Due to its invasive nature, the contraindications of PUBS, reasons to not undergo the procedure, must be taken into account in order to ensure the safety of the fetus and the mother. During the first 18 weeks of pregnancy, the umbilical vein from which the blood sample is taken is not very stable, which could lead to excessive bleeding; therefore, PUBS is contraindicated in any fetus under the age of 18 weeks old. While blood gas levels and pH values are able to give parents and medical professionals a snapshot of fetal status, these fetuses can be monitored with less invasive procedures and equipment, such as ultrasounds, cardiotocography, or maternal blood tests. Mothers affected by hepatitis B are not advised to undergo PUBS. In these cases, the fetus would be put at an increased risk of contracting the hepatitis virus from the mother. However, the necessity of the procedure should be considered along with this risk. PUBS should not be performed in mothers testing positive for the human immunodeficiency virus (HIV) due to increased risk of fetal contraction. If PUBS is being used to determine if the fetus has been infected with HIV it may not be contraindicated.

== Fetuses with a single umbilical artery ==
Single umbilical artery. Left: thin-walled vein Right: thick-walled single artery.

The most prevalent defect in about 1% of fetuses' umbilical region is a single umbilical artery. When a single umbilical artery is found, more tests are run including a detailed ultrasound to detect any other developmental abnormalities that may be the result of the single artery, genetic deviation, or other causes. Fetal developmental abnormalities along with the concern of an abnormal karyotype indicate PUBS; however, fetuses with a single umbilical artery may present a higher risk. In these cases, a single umbilical artery is required to perform the work of two arteries so it is often dilated up to one and a half times its size in order to meet these demands. A documented case of puncturing a single umbilical artery during PUBS resulted in a decrease in the heart rate of the fetus with irregular improvement; however, it is difficult to conclude that these symptoms were solely the result of the punctured umbilical artery because these fetuses often have preexisting defects and abnormalities. While ultrasounds and color flow mapping can be used to avoid the umbilical artery and sample from the umbilical vein, the dilation makes the single umbilical artery easier to puncture. Blood flow in the umbilical artery is seen to be twice the normal amount from about 20 weeks on so the effects of a punctured umbilical artery during PUBS are more severe.

== See also ==
- Prenatal diagnosis
- Genetic testing
- Amniocentesis
- Chorionic villus sampling
