= Erythrocyte rosetting =

Phenomenon in microscopy of red blood cells

Erythrocyte rosetting or E-rosetting is a phenomenon seen through a microscope where red blood cells (erythrocytes) are arranged around a central cell to form a cluster that looks like a flower. The red blood cells surrounding the cell form the petal, while the central cell forms the stigma of the flower shape. This formation occurs due to an immunological reaction between an epitope on the central cell's surface and a receptor or antibody on a red cell. The presence of E-rosetting can be used as a test for T cells although more modern tests such as immunohistochemistry are available. Rosetting is caused by parasites in the genus Plasmodium and is a cause of some malaria-associated symptoms.

== Rosetting techniques ==
Three types of rosette techniques have been developed and used experimentally.

=== Rosette test for Rh factor ===
The Rosette test is performed on postpartum maternal blood to estimate the volume of fetal-maternal hemorrhage in case of an Rh negative mother and an Rh positive child. This estimate, in turn, also estimates the required amount of Rho(D) immune globulin to administer. In this test, a sample of maternal blood is incubated with Rho(D) immune globulin, which will bind to any fetal Rh positive red blood cells, if present. Upon addition of enzyme-treated cDE indicator cells, the presence of Rh positive fetal blood causes rosetting, which can be seen by light microscopy. The test is recommended for Rh negative mothers within 72 hours of giving birth to an Rh-positive infant. In a positive test, it is recommended that a Kleihauer–Betke test should be performed to confirm and quantify any positive rosette tests.

=== E-rosetting ===
E-rosetting is used in the identification of T cells where a T cells CD2 surface protein is bound to a sugar based LFA-3 homologue on the surface of a sheep red blood cell. Because the LFA-3 homologue is only present on the surface of sheep red blood cells other species red blood cells can not be used in this type of rosetting.

=== EA-rosetting ===
Erythrocyte antibody rosetting (EA-rosetting), occurs when an antibody molecule that is specific for an epitope on another cell is embedded in the membrane of a red blood cell and then reacted against a cell carrying the epitope that the antibody is specific for.

=== EAC-rosetting ===
Erythrocyte antibody complement rosetting (EAC-rosetting), occurs when antibody in the presence of complement is bound to the surface of a red blood cell. The complement binds to the tail region (Fc region) of the antibody. Finally T-cells with a complement receptor are added and the T-cells bind to the complement on the antibody completing the rosette.
