= Polytypic =

Polytypic means of more than one type. It often refers to:

- Polytypic function, in computer science
- Polytypic habitat, in ecology, a habitat not dominated by a single species
- Polytypic taxon, in biology, a taxon with more than one immediately subordinate taxon

== See also ==
- Polyclonal antibodies
- Polytypes in crystallography
- Race (classification of human beings) for a discussion of whether the species Homo sapiens is polytypic
