= Mike Sheppard =

Mike Sheppard may refer to:

- Mike Sheppard (American football), American football coach
- Mike Sheppard (baseball), American college baseball coach
- Mike Sheppard (rugby union), Canadian rugby union player

== See also ==
- H. Michael Shepard, American cancer researcher
