= KB test =

KB test can refer to two different medical tests:

- The Kirby–Bauer test (agar diffusion test), a test of the antibiotic sensitivity of bacteria
- The Kleihauer–Betke test (acid elution test), a test of the amount of fetal hemoglobin transferred from a fetus to a mother's bloodstream
