= Polyclonal antibodies =

Type of immunoglobulin molecule

Polyclonal antibodies (pAbs) are antibodies that are secreted by different B cell lineages within the body (whereas monoclonal antibodies come from a single cell lineage). They are a collection of immunoglobulin molecules that react against a specific antigen, each identifying a different epitope.

== Production ==
The general procedure to produce polyclonal antibodies is as follows:

1. Antigen preparation
2. Adjuvant selection and preparation
3. Animal selection
4. Injection process
5. Blood serum extraction

An antigen/adjuvant conjugate is injected into an animal of choice to initiate an amplified immune response. After a series of injections over a specific length of time, the animal is expected to have created antibodies against the conjugate. Blood is then extracted from the animal and then purified to obtain the antibody of interest.

Inoculation is performed on a suitable mammal, such as a mouse, rabbit or goat. Larger mammals are often preferred as the amount of serum that can be collected is greater. An antigen is injected into the mammal. This induces the B-lymphocytes to produce IgG immunoglobulins specific for the antigen. This polyclonal IgG is purified from the mammal's serum.

By contrast, monoclonal antibodies are derived from a single cell line.

Many methodologies exist for polyclonal antibody production in laboratory animals. Institutional guidelines governing animal use and procedures relating to these methodologies are generally oriented around humane considerations and appropriate conduct for adjuvant (agents which modify the effect of other agents while having few if any direct effects when given by themselves) use. This includes adjuvant selection, routes and sites of administration, injection volumes per site and number of sites per animal. Institutional policies generally include allowable volumes of blood per collection and safety precautions including appropriate restraint and sedation or anesthesia of animals for injury prevention to animals or personnel.

The primary goal of antibody production in laboratory animals is to obtain high titer, high affinity antisera for use in experimentation or diagnostic tests. Adjuvants are used to improve or enhance an immune response to antigens. Most adjuvants provide for an injection site, antigen depot which allows for a slow release of antigen into draining lymph nodes.

Many adjuvants also contain or act directly as:

1. surfactants which promote concentration of protein antigens molecules over a large surface area, and
2. immunostimulatory molecules or properties. Adjuvants are generally used with soluble protein antigens to increase antibody titers and induce a prolonged response with accompanying memory.

Such antigens by themselves are generally poor immunogens. Most complex protein antigens induce multiple B-cell clones during the immune response, thus, the response is polyclonal. Immune responses to non-protein antigens are generally poorly or enhanced by adjuvants and there is no system memory.

Antibodies are currently also being produced from isolation of human B-lymphocytes to produce specific recombinant monoclonal antibody mixtures. The biotechnology company, Symphogen, develops this type of antibodies for therapeutic applications. They are the first research company to reach phase two trials with the monoclonal antibody mixtures that mimic the diversity of the polyclonal antibody drugs. This production prevents viral and prion transmission and this is the simple process.

== Animal selection ==
Animals frequently used for polyclonal antibody production include chickens, goats, guinea pigs, hamsters, horses, mice, rats, and sheep. However, the rabbit is the most commonly used laboratory animal for this purpose. Animal selection should be based upon:

1. the amount of antibody needed,
2. the relationship between the donor of the antigen and the recipient antibody producer (generally the more distant the phylogenetic relationship, the greater the potential for high titer antibody response) and
3. the necessary characteristics [e.g., class, subclass (isotype), complement fixing nature] of the antibodies to be made. Immunization and phlebotomies are stress associated and, at least when using rabbits and rodents, specific pathogen free (SPF) animals are preferred. Use of such animals can dramatically reduce morbidity and mortality due to pathogenic organisms, especially Pasteurella multocida in rabbits.

Goats or horses are generally used when large quantities of antisera are required. Many investigators favor chickens because of their phylogenetic distance from mammals. Chickens transfer high quantities of IgY (IgG) into the egg yolk and harvesting antibodies from eggs eliminates the need for the invasive bleeding procedure. One week's eggs can contain 10 times more antibodies than the volume of rabbit blood obtained from one weekly bleeding. However, there are some disadvantages when using certain chicken derived antibodies in immunoassays. Chicken IgY does not fix mammalian complement component C1 and it does not perform as a precipitating antibody using standard solutions.

Although mice are used most frequently for monoclonal antibody production, their small size usually prevents their use for sufficient quantities of polyclonal, serum antibodies. However, polyclonal antibodies in mice can be collected from ascites fluid using any one of a number of ascites producing methodologies.

When using rabbits, young adult animals (2.5–3.0 kg or 5.5–6.5 lb) should be used for primary immunization because of the vigorous antibody response. Immune function peaks at puberty and primary responses to new antigens decline with age. Female rabbits are generally preferred because they are more docile and are reported to mount a more vigorous immune response than males. At least two animals per antigen should be used when using outbred animals. This principle reduces potential total failure resulting from non-responsiveness to antigens of individual animals.

== Antigen preparation ==
The size, extent of aggregation and relative nativity of protein antigens can all dramatically affect the quality and quantity of antibody produced. Small polypeptides (< 10 kDa) and non-protein antigens generally need to be conjugated or crosslinked to larger, immunogenic, carrier proteins to increase immunogenicity and provide T cell epitopes. Generally, the larger the immunogenic protein the better. Larger proteins, even in smaller amounts, usually result in better engagement of antigen presenting antigen processing cells for a satisfactory immune response. Injection of soluble, non-aggregated proteins has a higher probability of inducing tolerance rather than a satisfactory antibody response.

Keyhole limpet hemocyanin (KLH) and bovine serum albumin are two widely used carrier proteins. Poly-L-lysine has also been used successfully as a backbone for peptides. Although the use of Poly-L-lysine reduces or eliminates production of antibodies to foreign proteins, it may result in failure of peptide-induced antibody production. Recently, liposomes have also been successfully used for delivery of small peptides and this technique is an alternative to delivery with oily emulsion adjuvants.

=== Antigen quantity ===
Selection of antigen quantity for immunization varies with the properties of the antigen and the adjuvant selected. In general, microgram to milligram quantities of protein in adjuvant are necessary to elicit high titer antibodies. Antigen dosage is generally species, rather than body weight, associated. The so-called "window" of immunogenicity in each species is broad but too much or too little antigen can induce tolerance, suppression or immune deviation towards cellular immunity rather than a satisfactory humoral response. Optimal and usual protein antigen levels for immunizing specific species have been reported in the following ranges:

1. rabbit, 50–1000 μg;
2. mouse, 10–50 μg;
3. guinea pig, 50–500 μg; and
4. goat, 250–5000 μg.

Optimal "priming" doses are reported to be at the low end of each range.

The affinity of serum antibodies increases with time (months) after injection of antigen-adjuvant mixtures and as antigen in the system decreases. Widely used antigen dosages for "booster" or secondary immunizations are usually one half to equal the priming dosages. Antigens should be free of preparative byproducts and chemicals such as polyacrylamide gel, SDS, urea, endotoxin, particulate matter and extremes of pH.

=== Peptide antibodies ===
When a peptide is being used to generate the antibody, it is extremely important to design the antigens properly. There are several resources that can aid in the design as well as companies that offer this service. Expasy has aggregated a set of public tools under its ProtScale page that require some degree of user knowledge to navigate. For a more simple peptide scoring tool there is a Antigen Profiler tool available that will enable you to score individual peptide sequences based upon a relation epitope mapping database of previous immunogens used to generate antibodies. Finally, as a general rule peptides should follow some basic criteria.

When examining peptides for synthesis and immunization, it is recommended that certain residues and sequences be avoided due to potential synthesis problems. This includes some of the more common characteristics:

- Extremely long repeats of the same amino acid (e.g. RRRR)
- Serine (S), Threonine (T), Alanine (A), and Valine (V) doublets
- Ending or starting a sequence with a proline (P)
- Glutamine (Q) or Asparagine (N) at the n-terminus
- Peptides over weighted with hydrophobic residues (e.g. V, A, L, I, etc....)

=== Reactivity ===
Investigators should also consider the status of nativity of protein antigens when used as immunogens and reaction with antibodies produced. Antibodies to native proteins react best with native proteins and antibodies to denatured proteins react best with denatured proteins. If elicited antibodies are to be used on membrane blots (proteins subjected to denaturing conditions) then antibodies should be made against denatured proteins. On the other hand, if antibodies are to be used to react with a native protein or block a protein active site, then antibodies should be made against the native protein. Adjuvants can often alter the nativity of the protein. Generally, absorbed protein antigens in a preformed oil-in-water emulsion adjuvant, retain greater native protein structure than those in water-in-oil emulsions.

=== Asepticity ===
Antigens should always be prepared using techniques that ensure that they are free of microbial contamination. Most protein antigen preparations can be sterilized by passage through a 0.22 μm filter. Septic abscesses often occur at inoculation sites of animals when contaminated preparations are used. This can result in failure of immunization against the targeted antigen.

== Adjuvants ==
There are many commercially available immunologic adjuvants. Selection of specific adjuvants or types varies depending upon whether they are to be used for research and antibody production or in vaccine development. Adjuvants for vaccine use only need to produce protective antibodies and good systemic memory while those for antiserum production need to rapidly induce high titer, high avidity antibodies. No single adjuvant is ideal for all purposes and all have advantages and disadvantages. Adjuvant use generally is accompanied by undesirable side effects of varying severity and duration. Research on new adjuvants focuses on substances which have minimal toxicity while retaining maximum immunostimulation. Investigators should always be aware of potential pain and distress associated with adjuvant use in laboratory animals.

The most frequently used adjuvants for antibody production are Freund's, Alum, the Ribi Adjuvant System and Titermax.

== Pharmaceutical uses ==
Digoxin Immune Fab is the antigen binding fragment of polyclonal antibodies raised to Digitalis derivative as a hapten bound to a protein and is used for the reversal of life-threatening digoxin or digitoxin toxicity.

Rho(D) immune globulin is made from pooled human plasma provided by Rh-negative donors with antibodies to the D antigen. It is used to provide passive immune binding of antigen, preventing a maternal active immune response which could potentially result in hemolytic disease of the newborn.

Rozrolimupab is the anti-RhD recombinant human polyclonal antibody composed of 25 unique IgG1 antibodies and is used for the treatment of immune thrombocytopenia purpura and prevention of isoimmunization in Rh-negative pregnant women.

REGN-COV2 (Regeneron Pharmaceuticals) – potential treatment for people with COVID-19 and to prevent SARS-CoV-2 coronavirus infection.

== Advantages ==
The use of polyclonal antibodies (pAbs) over monoclonal antibodies has its advantages. The technical skills needed to produce polyclonal antibodies is not as demanding. They're inexpensive to make and can be generated fairly quickly, taking up to several months to produce. PAbs are heterogeneous, which allows them to bind to a wide range of antigen epitopes. Because PAbs are produced from a large number of B cell clones, they're more likely to successfully bind to a specific antigen. PAbs remain stable in different environments, such as a change in pH or salt concentration, which allows them to be more applicable in certain procedures. Additionally, depending on the amount needed, PAbs can be made in large quantities in relation to the size of the animal used.

== Drawbacks ==
There are drawbacks using polyclonal antibodies over monoclonal antibodies. This is mostly on the reproducibility aspect. pAbs are generated by immune response to antigen. Individual animal or human will generate different antibodies against the same antigen. In the case of multiple exposure of the same antigen, the pAbs mixture will be different over time. This so called 'batch-to-batch' variability is one of the biggest concerns in using pAbs.

== Recombinant Polyclonal Antibodies ==
Despite the drawbacks, polyclonal antibodies' broad epitope recognition and higher sensitivity are key across different applications. Scientists use mixtures of monoclonal antibodies (mAbs) to mimic pAbs. The recombinant production of mAbs solved the variability and reproducibility concerns in pAbs. The mixture of many mAbs will mimic pAbs' broader epitope recognition and higher sensitivity. Recent technology advancements allowed the direct sequencing of polyclonal antibody proteins from human and immunized animals. Those antibody proteins can then be recombinantly produced to mimic the original pAbs generated by the immune system.

== See also ==
- Plasma B cell
- Clone (B-cell biology)
- Polyclonal response
