= William Pollack (immunologist) =

American immunologist (1926–2013)

William Pollack (February 26, 1926 – November 3, 2013) was a British-born American immunologist who developed the Rho(D) immune globulin vaccine against Rh disease, a leading cause of erythroblastosis fetalis. Pollack co-developed the vaccine, also known by the RhoGAM brand name, which is given to pregnant women to prevent Rh disease, with Dr. Vincent Freda and Dr. John G. Gorman of Columbia-Presbyterian Medical Center. Pollack's vaccine, introduced in 1968, virtually eliminated cases of Rh disease in developed countries. Prior to the RhoGAM vaccine, Rh disease was responsible for approximately 10,000 infant deaths in the United States annually.

The development of the RhoGAM vaccine has been called one of the ten greatest medical breakthroughs of the 20th Century. Pollack, Freda and Gorman were awarded the Albert Lasker Clinical Medical Research Award for their achievement in 1980.

== Early life and education ==
Pollack was born in London on February 26, 1926, to David and Rose Pollack. He served in the Royal Navy during World War II. He enrolled at Imperial College, London after the war, earning a bachelor's degree in chemistry in 1948. In 1950, Pollack received a master's degree from St. George's Hospital Medical School. He then worked in the pathology department at St. George's from 1948 to 1954.

== Career ==
Pollack moved to British Columbia, Canada, in 1954 to become a director of a blood bank and clinical laboratory. In 1956, he moved, this time to Princeton, New Jersey. He joined the staff of Ortho Pharmaceutical, where he began his research on his Rh disease vaccine. He would eventually become Ortho Pharmaceutical's vice president and director of research. Pollack obtained a doctorate in zoology at Rutgers University while researching Rh disease at Ortho.

Pollack later taught immunology at Rutgers University and Columbia University.

== Illness and death ==
Dr. William Pollack died from complications of diabetes and heart disease on November 3, 2013, in Yorba Linda, California, at the age of 87. He was survived by his sons, Malcolm and David, and predeceased by his wife, Alison Calder, who died in 2006.
