= John Gorman =

John Gorman may refer to:

- John Gorman (director) (1884–1936), American movie director
- John Gorman (entertainer) (born 1936), English vocalist and musician
- John Gorman (politician) (1923–2014), Northern Ireland politician
- John Gorman (footballer) (born 1949), former football player and coach
- John J. Gorman (1883–1949), U.S. Representative from Illinois
- John R. Gorman (1925–2025), American Roman Catholic bishop
- John Gorman (radio executive) (born 1950), WMMS radio personality
- Johnny Gorman (born 1992), Northern Ireland international football player
- John Gorman (physician) (born c. 1931), Australian medical researcher
- John P. Gorman (1897–1983), college football player and coach at Princeton University
- John Patrick Gorman (1876–1963), Canadian politician in the Nova Scotia House of Assembly
- John T. Gorman (1856–1926), American businessman and politician from New York
