= Elizabeth F. Neufeld =

French-American geneticist

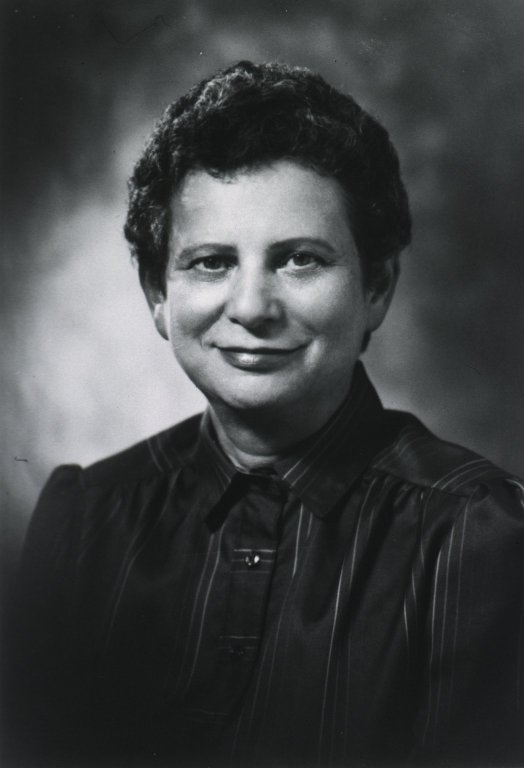
- Born: Elizabeth Fondal; September 27, 1928 (age 98); Paris, France
- Citizenship: American
- Education: B.S., Queens College, 1948; Ph.D, University of California, Berkeley, 1956
- Spouse: Benjamin S. Neufeld (m. 1951; died 2020)
- Children: 2
- Awards: Dickson Prize (1975); Wolf Prize; Albert Lasker Award for Clinical Medical Research; William Allan Award (1982); Elliott Cresson Medal (1984); National Medal of Science (1994)
- Scientific career
- Fields: Genetics
- Workplaces: Jackson Laboratory

Elizabeth Fondal Neufeld (born September 27, 1928) is a French-American geneticist whose research has focused on the genetic basis of metabolic disease in humans.

== Life ==
Neufeld and her Russian Jewish family emigrated to the United States from Paris in 1940; they had left Europe as refugees to escape Nazi persecution, after receiving transit visas from the Portuguese consul, Aristides de Sousa Mendes. The family settled in New York, where she attended Hunter College High School before graduating from Queens College in 1948 with a Bachelor of Science. She went on to work as a research assistant at the Jackson Laboratory in Bar Harbor, Maine, looking at blood disorders in mice. Later on, she attended graduate school at University of California, Berkeley, where she earned a Ph.D. in 1956 for her work on nucleotides and complex carbohydrates.

Neufeld has been widely recognized for her contributions to science. She is a member of the National Academy of Sciences and the American Philosophical Society. She was elected to the American Academy of Arts and Sciences in 1977. Neufeld has been awarded the Wolf Prize, the Albert Lasker Award for Clinical Medical Research, and was awarded the National Medal of Science in 1994 "for her contributions to the understanding of the lysosomal storage diseases, demonstrating the strong linkage between basic and applied scientific investigation." Neufeld was a biochemist researcher at the National Institute of Health studying mucopolysaccharidosis disorders, a group of lysosomal storage disorders in which mucopolysaccharides cannot be metabolized properly in the body. Her work showed that the genetic defects observed in Hunter and Hurler syndrome are due to a degradation of mucopolysaccharides. Neufeld's work helped advance the treatment of Hurler and Hunter syndrome.

In 1973, Neufeld became chief of NIH section of Human Biochemical Genetics, and in 1979, she became the chief of the Genetics and Biochemistry branch of National Institute of Arthritis, Diabetes, and Digestive and Kidney Diseases (NIADDK). Neufeld retired in 2004 from UCLA as Chair of the Department of Biological Chemistry, a position she occupied since 1984.

== Personal life ==
Elizabeth Fondal married Benjamin S. Neufeld in 1951; they had two children together.

== Selected publications ==
Ohmi K, Greenberg DS, Rajavel KS, Ryazantsev S, Li HH, Neufeld EF., (2003), "Activated microglia in cortex of mouse models of mucopolysaccharidoses I and IIIB." Proceedings of the National Academy of Sciences of the United States of America. 100: 1902-7. PMID 12576554 doi:10.1073/pnas.252784899

Elizabeth F. Neufeld, W.Z. Hassid,(1963), "Biosynthesis of Saccharides from Glycopyranosyl Esters of Nucleotides ("Sugar Nucleotides")", Editor(s): Melville L. Wolfrom, R. Stuart Tipson, Advances in Carbohydrate Chemistry, Academic Press, Volume 18, 1963, Pages 309-356, ISSN 0096-5332, ISBN 978-0-12-007218-7, doi:10.1016/S0096-5332(08)60246-5

== See also ==
- Inborn error of metabolism
