= Joseph Edward Smadel =

American virologist (1907–1963)

Joseph Edward Smadel (1907–1963) was a U.S. medical doctor and virologist. He introduced chloramphenicol as treatment for rickettsial diseases. In 1962, he became the first recipient of the Albert Lasker Award for Clinical Medical Research.

== Biography ==
Smadel was born in Vincennes, Indiana, the son of medical doctor Joseph William Smadel and former nurse Clara Greene Smadel. He completed his undergraduate work at the University of Pennsylvania then obtained a medical degree from the Washington University School of Medicine, St. Louis in 1931. It was at Washington University that he met his future wife, Elizabeth Moore. Smadel was a member of the virological team that first recognized an outbreak of St. Louis encephalitis in 1933.

Smadel then moved on to New York City to work under scientists Homer Swift and Thomas M. Rivers at the Rockefeller Institute. While there, Smadel took a strong interest in the new field of virology. He formed a productive, long term professional association with Dr. Rivers, the two of them jointly publishing numerous articles. Utilizing the then new techniques of ultra-centrifugation and chemical fractionation, Smadel made significant contributions to the understanding of myxomatosis, viral encephalitis, variola, vaccinia, and psittacosis.

Smadel joined the U.S. Naval Reserve in December, 1940, but went on full-time active duty with the U.S. Army’s Medical Department Professional Service School (MDPSS) in August, 1942. (The MDPSS officially became the Walter Reed Army Institute of Research (WRAIR) in 1953 after a number of intermediate name changes.) The freshly commissioned Captain Smadel was assigned as Chief Virologist with the First Medical General Laboratory in the European Theater with the mission of controlling the outbreak of typhus fever in the Mediterranean region in May 1943. Following the Normandy invasion, he was assigned to an advanced field laboratory in France. Following the Allied victory in Europe, Lieutenant Colonel Smadel became the director of the Department Of Virus and Rickettsial Diseases with at the WRAIR, a position he held after his return to civilian life. Perhaps Smadel's most notable professional achievement was the series of field studies in Kuala Lumpur in 1948 which established chloramphenicol as an effective treatment for typhus and typhoid fever.

In the 1950s, under Smadel's direction, WRAIR established itself as one of the première institutes for the study of infectious diseases. Research programs there included the study of leptospirosis, plague, hemorrhagic fever, arboviral diseases, enteric diseases, cholera, and rickettsial diseases such as typhus.

Smadel after exerting much pressure on Jonas Salk and Basil O'Connor was in early 1954 given the assignment of writing the production protocols for the Polio Vaccine.

In 1956 Smadel left the institute to become the associate director of the National Institutes of Health. In 1963, he assumed a new position as chief, Laboratory of Virology and Rickettsiology, Division of Biologics Standards, National Institutes of Health, which he held until his death.

== Honors and accolades ==
- In 1962, Smadel was awarded the Albert Lasker Clinical Medical Research Award.
