= Edmund Klein =

American physician

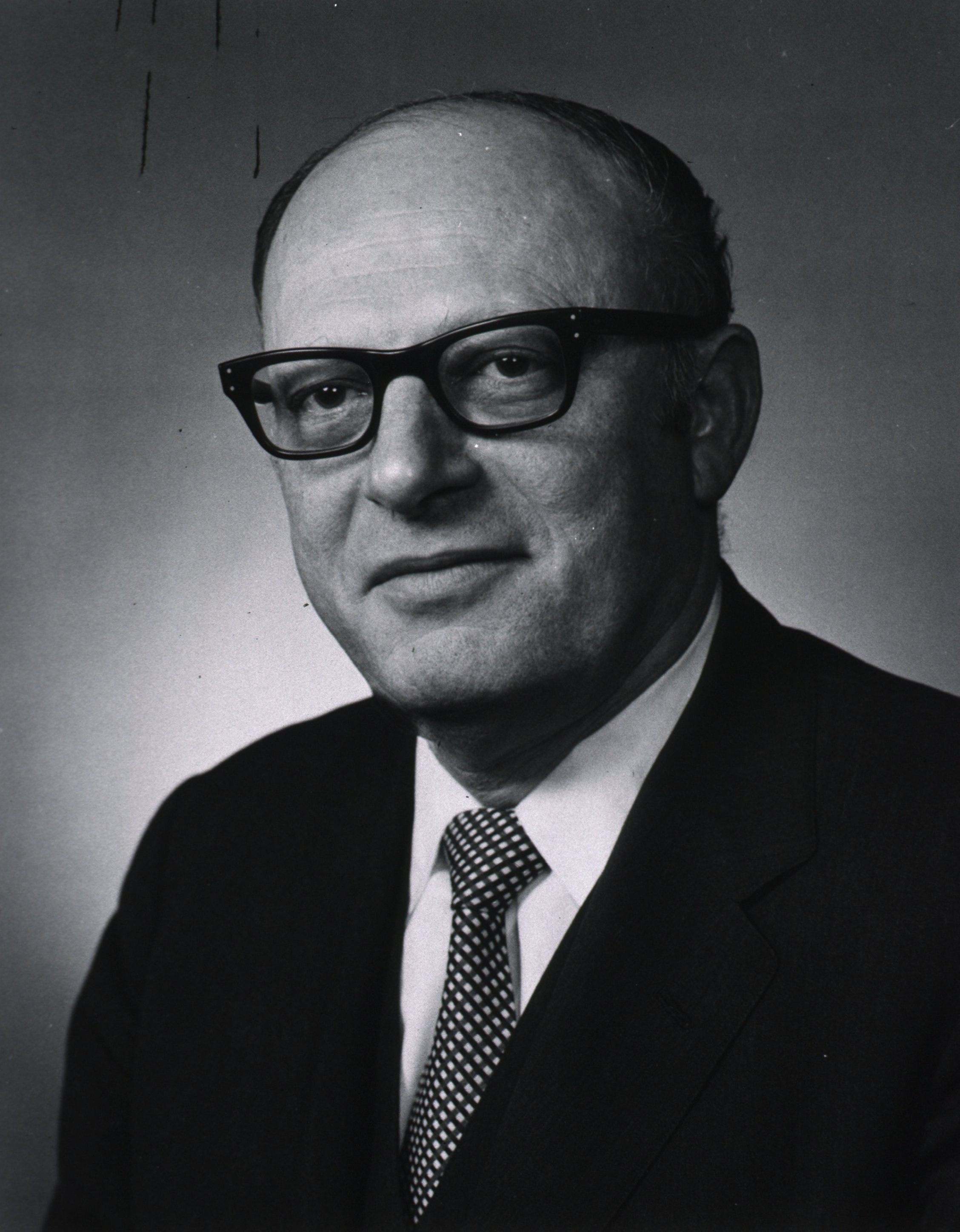
- Born: October 22, 1922; Vienna, Austria
- Died: July 23, 1999 (aged 76)
- Education: University of London; University of Toronto
- Known for: Development of effective treatments for Kaposi's sarcoma Development of technique to separate whole human blood into its components
- Medical career
- Profession: Medical Doctor
- Field: Dermatology
- Institutions: Roswell Park Comprehensive Cancer Center; University at Buffalo
- Awards: Lasker Award (1972); William B. Coley Award (1975)

Edmund Klein (22 October 1922 – 23 July 1999) was an Austrian-born American dermatologist.

He was born in Vienna, Austria, to David Klein, a cantor, and Helen Bibelman Klein. Jewish, he escaped from Austria in 1938, during the Anschluss.

He was a research professor at the University at Buffalo and served as chief of dermatology at Roswell Park Comprehensive Cancer Center. Klein developed a topical treatment for skin cancer with 5-fluorouracil, developed one of the first effective treatments for Kaposi's sarcoma, and was amongst the first to clinically explore the use of lymphocytes to help cancer patients, earning him the nickname "the Father of Immunotherapy." He won the 1972 Lasker Award.

Klein developed a technique that allowed the separation of whole human blood into its component parts of plasma, platelets, white blood cells, and red blood cells, greatly increasing the efficiency of the entire transfusion process; now three people could benefit from a single donor instead of one, with red blood cells used for anemic individuals, platelets for cancer patients, and plasma for those with decreased blood volume. Klein's results were published in both the New England Journal of Medicine and the Journal of Pediatrics and earned him the first prize for originality of research from the International Society for Hematology in 1956.
