= Louis Katz =

American cardiologist

Louis Nelson Katz (1897 in Pinsk, Russian Empire – 1973) was an American cardiologist. Katz wrote more than 500 publications on hemodynamics, electrocardiography, hypertension, experimental atherosclerosis, the coronary circulation, myocardial metabolism, and more.

== Awards ==
- Lasker-DeBakey Clinical Medical Research Award (1956)
