= Symphogen =

Symphogen is a biotechnology company located in Copenhagen, Denmark that develops protein drugs based on recombinant monoclonal antibody mixtures. These drugs are different from the polyclonal antibodies, as each antibody in the mixture is produced from one carefully selected clone. Their three main areas of therapeutic research are immunoglobulin replacement, cancer, and infectious diseases. The company was founded in 2000 and has patents on a drug discovery platform called Symplex and a drug manufacturing platform called Sympress. By 2009, ten drugs were being developed with rozrolimupab (Sym001) being the lead product. Laboratoires Servier acquired Symphogen in 2020.

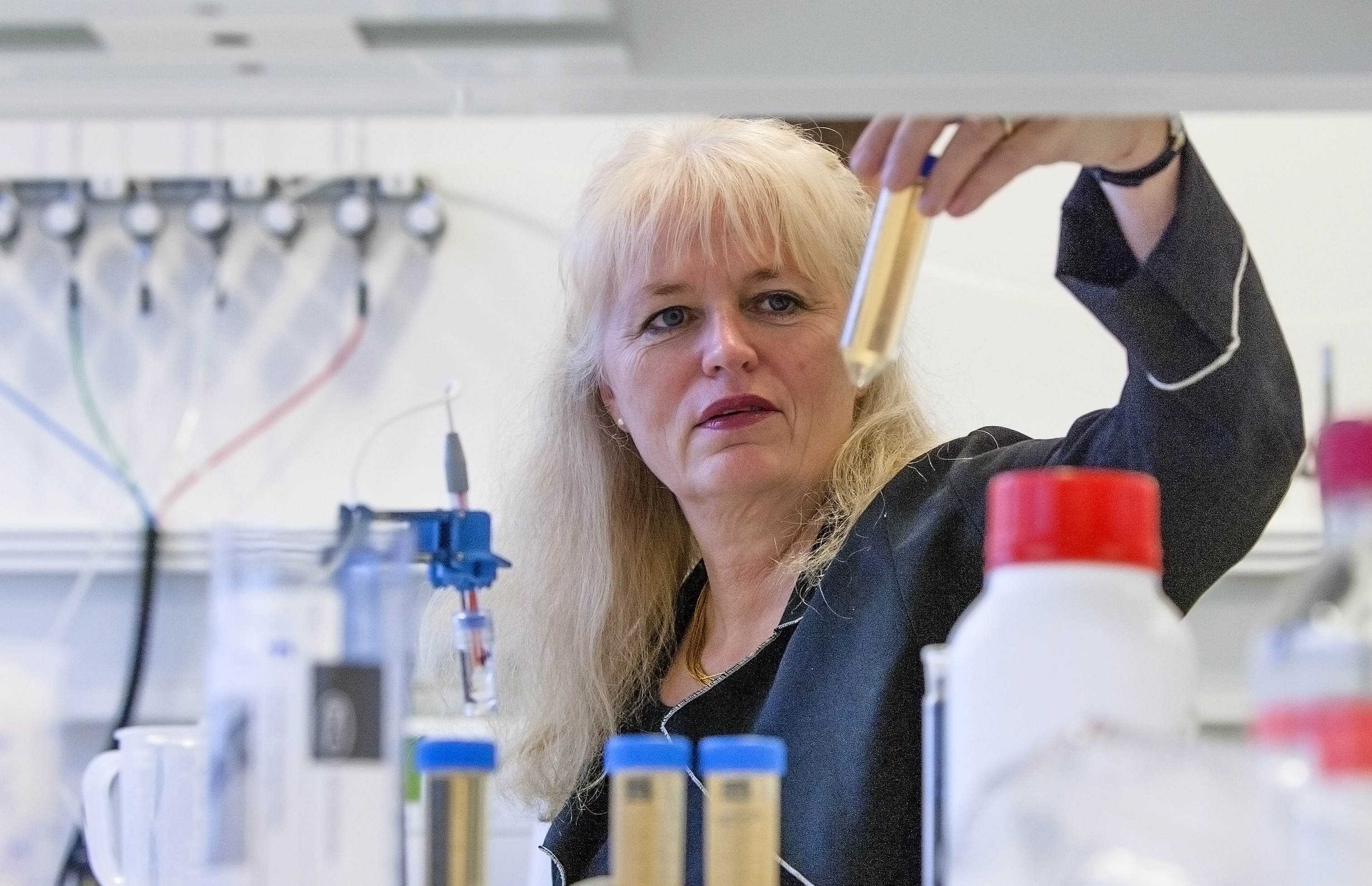
Founder Kirsten Drejer

== Partner collaborations ==
Genentech, Inc.: Collaboration pact with Genentech which enables both companies to utilize Symplex technology to help discover new antibodies against three undisclosed infectious disease targets.

Meiji Seika Kaisha, Ltd: Sym006 development and license agreement with Meiji Seika that establishes a collaboration of research, development, and commercialization.

Biovitrum: A co-development and commercialization agreement with Biovitrum for Sym001. The United States Food and Drug Administration granted an orphan drug designation to Sym001.

NIAID/NIH: Sym002 developmental grant with the National Institutes of Health for a recombinant polyclonal antibody against smallpox. The grant enables Symphogen to complete pre-clinical development of Sym002, which allows submission of an Investigational New Drug application for new safety studies.

== Multiclonal antibodies ==
Recombinant monoclonal antibody mixtures mimic the diversity, specificity and binding capability of the natural immune system and increase the likelihood of the rapid elimination of the desired antigens. IgG antibodies are typically used due to their effectiveness in binding to many kinds of pathogens as well as protecting the body against the pathogens by immobilization, complement activation, opsonization for phagocytosis and neutralization of their toxins.

Multi-clonal antibodies developed at Symphogen are mixtures of monoclonal antibodies, where each of the mAbs binds specifically to one unique epitope of the target. Technically, Symphogen products are not polyclonal antibodies, since the latter bind to different epitopes of the target molecule. By producing mixtures of the monoclonal antibodies, Symphogen avoids the major drawback of the polyclonal antibodies, which quality is difficult to control due to the diversity in their biophysical characteristics and biological activity.

According to Symphogen, their proprietary monoclonal antibody mixtures reflect both the diversity of immunoglobulins and specificity of monoclonal antibodies. It is possible to produce an unlimited supply of these antibodies using traditional large-scale biological manufacturing techniques; these antibodies are produced with no risk of viral or prion transmission according to Symphogen. This new class of therapeutic antibodies could be effective in treating complex diseases such as cancer for it allows the combination of several treatment modalities in one drug.

Recombinant multi-clonal antibodies, or mixtures of mAbs, could be advantageous for the following reasons:

- less sensitive to target diversification such as viral escape mutants
- hit multiple targets simultaneously
- create large immune complexes that activate effector functions
- create a higher density of antibodies on target surfaces enhancing downstream effector functions such as complement lysis, phagocytosis and antibody-dependent cell-mediated cytotoxicity

== Symplex technology ==
Symplex Technology is a process used to discover antibodies that are customized from plasma cells for a particular therapeutic application, and it involves direct isolation of the antibody genes from the immune system.

Symplex Process:

1. Immune cells are isolated from the spleen of mice or purified from human blood
2. B-lymphocytes are separated using differences in cell densities
3. Cells are individually sorted and antibodies are isolated
4. Symplex PCR uses reverse transcription
5. Heavy and light chains are amplified and conservatively paired back together in natural configuration
6. Each antibody is cloned, placed into a bacterial vector and stored in a library
7. Antibodies are placed into a well (repertoire arraying) and the DNA is extracted and prepared
8. DNA is transected to make protein and antibodies are cloned
9. The cloned antibodies are placed into wells and specifically chosen for further development based on antibody expression
10. Antibody of choice from the original gene pairs (conjugate pairs) is chosen by screening
11. A fully human antigen-specific antibody is produced

== Sympress technology ==
Sympress Technology is the manufacturing platform used to produce recombinant polyclonal antibodies in high yields. This technology enables the production of consistent mixtures of polyclonal antibodies with high batch-to-batch consistency at an industrial scale.

Sympress Process:

1. Antibodies are encoded on plasmids using Chinese hamster ovary cell lines
2. Cells undergo transfection
3. Cells where the antibody is most highly expressed are selected through fluorescent tagging
4. Cell lines are preserved and stored in cell banks
5. The individual cell lines encoding the highest quality antibodies are mixed and produced in high yields

Sympress I Technology has been used to develop the product Sym001. Recently, Sympress II Technology has been developed, and it uses random gene integration to improve the expression yield.

== Major products ==
Of the ten products that Symphogen is in the process of developing, two have completed pre-clinical phases and have entered clinical trials. Both Sym001 and Sym004 are in Phase 2 clinical trials.

=== Sym001 ===
Rozrolimupab (Sym001), an orphan drug, is a recombinant polyclonal antibody consisting of twenty-five monoclonal antibodies that is being developed for treatment of various hematological diseases such as, Idiopathic Thrombocytopenic Purpura and Hemolytic disease of the newborn.

=== Sym004 ===
Mechanism: Sym004 is a combination of two chimeric monoclonal antibodies (mAB), 992 and 1024, discovered and developed using the Symplex process that inhibits tumor growth in a number of cancerous cell lines including A431NS (A431 cells). When used together, 992 and 1024 cross link epidermal growth factor receptor (EGFR) and the EGFR is rapidly internalized and undergoes degradation. Alone, these mAbs are unable to effectively induce degradation of EGFR and inhibit tumor growth. mAb 992 and 1024 are thought to work synergistically. The antibodies bind to different epitopes on the EGFR and their cooperation shows a statistically significant improvement on tumor growth inhibition over non-synergistic use of the antibodies. Alone, Sym004 has been shown to be more potent than Cetuximab, a monoclonal antibody used to block ligands from accessing the EGFR, because Sym004 induces removal of the receptor from the cell surface. Sym004 also inhibits tumor cell growth because removal of the EGFR prevents it from cooperating with other receptors and signaling molecules in the tumor cell.

Clinical Results: Cynomolgus monkeys were used in preclinical studies. Dose range finding studies showed an increase in cynomolgus monkey kidney weight and decrease in body weight in respect to the control group, but both effects were reversible. The clearance of Sym004 is dependent on antibody mediated receptor internalization. Due to the efficiency of Sym004 induction of receptor internalization, repeat dose studies showed little accumulation of Sym004 and the clearance rate was higher than Cetuximab. Because EGFR is expressed in the skin and gastrointestinal tract, the only toxic side effects observed were rash and diarrhea, and presented much earlier than Cetuximab.

Current Status: Phase I trials finished in June 2011 in patients with colorectal cancer and squamous cell carcinoma of the head and neck. Phase II trials were announced on 23 August 2011 and are continuing for 24 weeks, beginning at Antwerp University Hospital in Belgium. Patients are receiving weekly doses, and the drug is being evaluated on "safety, efficacy, and pharmacokinetics".
