= Catharine Macfarlane =

American obstetrician and gynecologist

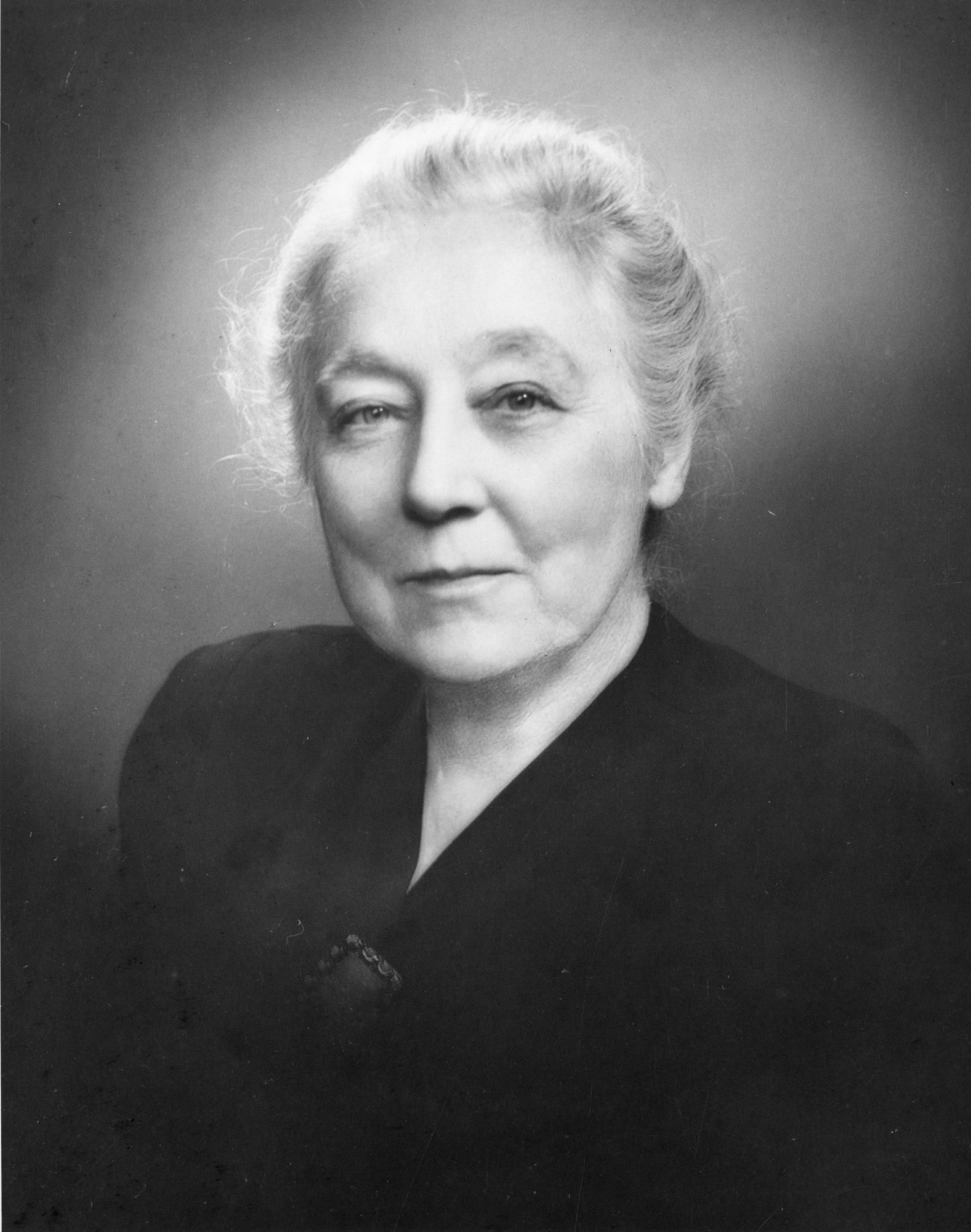
- Education: Woman's Medical College of Pennsylvania; University of Pennsylvania; Johns Hopkins University
- Medical career
- Institutions: Woman's Medical College of Pennsylvania Women's Hospital in Philadelphia American Cancer Society's Philadelphia Division
- Awards: Strittmatter Award Gimbel Award Distinguished Daughter of Pennsylvania Award Lasker Award for Clinical Medical Research Elizabeth Blackwell Citation from the Trustees of the New York Infirmary Mary Silberman Award

Catharine Macfarlane (1877–1969) was an American obstetrician and gynecologist who founded one of the first screening centers for uterine cancer in the United States. She was the first woman fellow of the College of Physicians of Philadelphia, and the first woman president of the Obstetrical Society of Philadelphia.

== Education ==
At the age of sixteen, Catherine Macfarlane entered the University of Philadelphia in 1893 and earned her Bachelor of Science in biology in 1895. By 1898 she earned her medical degree from the Women's Medical College of Pennsylvania before beginning postgraduate work at Johns Hopkins University. Macfarlane interned at the Women's Hospital of Philadelphia from the end of her medical education to 1900.

== Medical career ==
During her time interning at the Women's Hospital of Philadelphia, Macfarlane held the position of instructor in obstetrics at the Women's Medical College of Pennsylvania. She began a private practice in 1900 and continued this until 1903 at which time she accepted a position with the Women's Medical College of Pennsylvania as an instructor of gynecology. In her last year of private practice, she became the first practitioner to use radium in cancer treatment. After accepting the position of instructor of gynecology at the Women's Medical College of Pennsylvania, Macfarlane pursued graduate study in urology, obstetrics, gynecology, and radiology between 1903 and 1905. In 1908 she was appointed chief of gynecology at Women's Hospital in Philadelphia and in 1913 she was admitted to the American College of Surgeons. In 1922, Macfarlane was appointed professor of gynecology at the Women's Medical College of Pennsylvania, a position that she held until 1942. This same year she attended the first Pennsylvania State Conference on Birth Control alongside Margaret Sanger to advocate for women's right to vote and obtain birth control. Two years later in 1924, Catherine Macfarlane was appointed Chief of Obstetrics and Gynecology at Philadelphia General Hospital and accepted the position of research professor of gynecology at Woman's Medical College of Pennsylvania which she held until death. In 1938, Macfarlane co-founded the Cancer Control Research Project at the Woman's Medical College of Philadelphia. The same year, she received a grant from the Committee on Clinical Research of the American Medical Association to establish a cancer research and prevention clinic alongside which she opened the first uterine cancer screening program in the United States. In 1962, near the end of her career, Macfarlane began research on breast self exams with the Philadelphia Division of the American Cancer Society.

== Legacy and honors ==
In 1936, Macfarlane was appointed to the head of the Medical Women's National Association, later renamed the American Medical Women's Association. A year later, in 1937, she was appointed to the position of Vice President of the Medical Women's International Association which she held until 1947. The same year, in 1947, her five-year tenure as the chairman of the Cancer Committee of the Philadelphia Medical Society ended. Macfarlane served as the president of the Obstetrical Society of Philadelphia from 1943 to 1944.

In 1948 Macfarlane was the first woman to be awarded the Strittmatter Award. In 1949 she was awarded the Gimbel Award for humanitarian service. In 1951, Macfarlane was jointly awarded the Lasker Award for Clinical Medical Research for her applications of preventive medicine to cancer control. In 1953, Macfarlane was awarded the first annual Mary Silberman Award for her work on cancer prevention.
