= John Gorman (physician) =

Australian physician and medical researcher who co-developed Rho(D) immune globulin

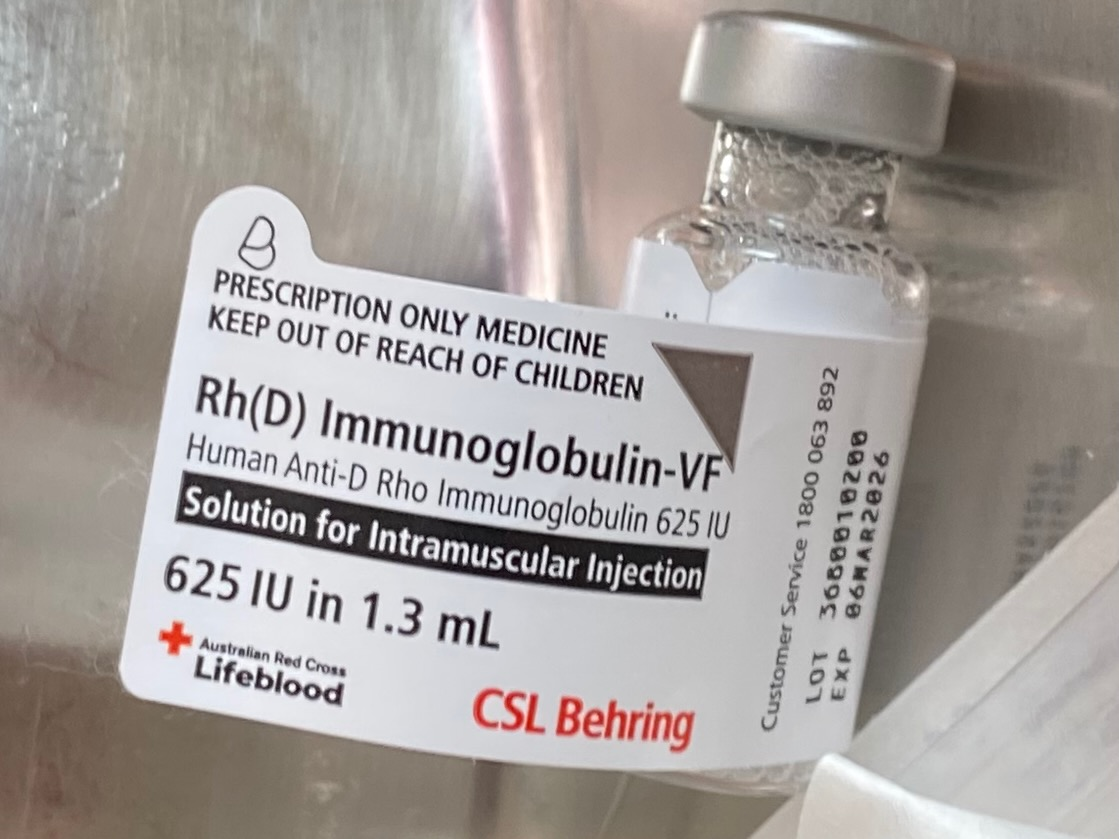
An ampoule of Rho(D) immune globulin, the prophylactic treatment Gorman co-developed, which has saved an estimated millions of lives since its introduction in 1968

John Grant Gorman AC (born c. 1931) is an Australian physician and medical researcher who co-developed Rho(D) immune globulin, the treatment responsible for the near-total elimination of hemolytic disease of the newborn in the developed world. His central insight — that passive administration of anti-Rh antibodies could prevent maternal immune sensitisation — was described by contemporaries as counterintuitive and by the Lasker Foundation as leading to "the conquest of hemolytic disease of the newborn."

Before Gorman's treatment was approved in 1968, Rh disease killed an estimated 10,000 infants annually in the United States and hundreds of thousands worldwide. Since the routine introduction of RhoGAM, those figures in the developed world have fallen to near zero. No maternal deaths attributable to Rh disease have been reported in high-income countries in over fifty years.

The treatment remains largely unavailable across much of the Global South. Approximately three million at-risk women annually — around 50 percent of those who require it — do not receive Rh immune globulin, resulting in an estimated 160,000 preventable fetal and neonatal deaths and 100,000 cases of lifelong neurological disability each year. Gorman has described this access gap as the central unfinished problem of his career, and continues to advocate for its resolution through the Worldwide Initiative for Rh Disease Eradication (WIRhE).

For his contributions, Gorman shared the 1980 Lasker-DeBakey Clinical Medical Research Award and, in 2024, was appointed an Honorary Companion of the Order of Australia (AC) — Australia's highest civilian honour — for "eminent service to medicine in co-discovering and pioneering a treatment for Rhesus disease for worldwide benefit to humanity."

== The problem Gorman set out to solve ==
=== Rh disease before prophylaxis ===
Rh disease — formally known as hemolytic disease of the newborn (HDN) due to Rh incompatibility — arises when an Rh-negative mother is exposed to Rh-positive fetal blood cells, typically during delivery, and mounts an immune response producing anti-D antibodies. In subsequent pregnancies carrying Rh-positive fetuses, these antibodies cross the placenta and destroy fetal red blood cells, causing progressive haemolytic anaemia, jaundice, kernicterus (brain damage from bilirubin toxicity), and frequently fetal or neonatal death.

The condition was common: approximately 15 percent of white women carry the Rh-negative blood type, and without intervention, around 10–15 percent of those delivering Rh-positive infants would become sensitised per pregnancy, with cumulative risk rising substantially with each subsequent affected birth. In Melbourne during Gorman's early career, Rh disease accounted for approximately ten percent of all neonatal deaths. In the United States as a whole, it caused an estimated 10,000 infant deaths annually before prophylaxis became available. Treatments existed — exchange transfusion and intrauterine transfusion — but were reactive, technically demanding, and applied after damage had already begun.

The field understood that maternal sensitisation was the mechanism. What it lacked was a method of prevention.

=== The scientific landscape at Columbia ===
By the late 1950s, several researchers across the United Kingdom and United States were working independently on the hypothesis that immune suppression might prevent sensitisation. In Liverpool, Cyril Clarke and Ronald Finn had observed that ABO incompatibility between mother and fetus appeared to offer some natural protection against Rh sensitisation, suggesting that rapid clearance of fetal cells from the maternal circulation might interrupt the immune cascade before it became established.

At Columbia-Presbyterian Medical Center in New York, Gorman arrived at a parallel but mechanistically distinct formulation. Drawing on Howard Florey's immunology textbook and concepts of antibody-mediated immune suppression documented by Theobald Smith in the context of diphtheria, Gorman proposed in 1958 that passive administration of exogenous anti-D antibodies — introduced directly into the maternal bloodstream — would bind to and clear Rh-positive fetal red blood cells before the immune system could recognise and respond to them. The approach was paradoxical: it proposed using the antibody responsible for causing Rh disease, in hyperimmune form, to prevent it entirely.

== Research and development of Rho(D) immune globulin ==
=== Formulating the theory ===
Gorman's theoretical framework rested on two well-established immunological principles that had not previously been synthesised in this context. First, that passive antibody administration could suppress active immune responses — a phenomenon documented in animal models since the early twentieth century. Second, that the timing of antigen clearance was critical: if fetal red blood cells could be eliminated from the maternal circulation within a sufficiently narrow window following delivery, the immune cascade might never be initiated.

The counterintuitive character of the proposal — introducing the causative antibody to prevent the disease — met with considerable scepticism. Its eventual vindication through clinical trial is now regarded as one of the more elegant demonstrations of applied immunological reasoning in twentieth-century medicine.

=== Collaboration with Freda and Pollack ===
To develop and test the preparation, Gorman partnered with two Columbia colleagues: Vincent Freda, an obstetrician with the clinical network necessary to conduct human trials, and William Pollack of Ortho Pharmaceuticals, who had developed the laboratory techniques required to isolate and concentrate anti-D antibodies from the plasma of sensitised Rh-negative donors into a stable, safe hyperimmune globulin preparation.

Pollack's contribution — the fractionation and purification of human serum into a pharmaceutically usable form without transmissible contamination — was technically critical and built directly on prior work in plasma fractionation. Freda's clinical access and obstetric expertise shaped the trial design. Gorman's role was the generative theoretical insight and the coordination of the overall research programme from his position as Director of the Columbia Blood Bank.

=== Clinical trials ===
Initial safety trials were conducted on male volunteers at Sing Sing Correctional Facility in the early 1960s, deliberately exposing participants to Rh-positive red blood cells following administration of the immune globulin preparation. The trials confirmed safety and demonstrated effective suppression of antibody formation, establishing proof of concept for human application.

The first application in a pregnant woman occurred in 1964, when Gorman administered the preparation to his sister-in-law, Kath Gorman, in London. She subsequently carried Rh-positive children without complications — a result that validated the treatment's practical application outside a controlled trial setting.

Larger multicentre trials across the mid-to-late 1960s — including the 1966–1968 Western Canadian study and an international multicentre trial — produced definitive results. Postpartum administration of Rh immune globulin within 72 hours of delivery reduced sensitisation rates from 10–15% in untreated controls to 0.3–3.4%, a prevention rate consistently exceeding 90 percent. Subsequent follow-up showed near-elimination of HDN incidence in treated cohorts.

=== FDA approval and global adoption ===
RhoGAM received FDA approval in 1968 and was rapidly integrated into routine perinatal care across the United States, Canada, Europe, and Australia. The addition of antenatal dosing at 28 weeks — combined with postpartum administration — subsequently raised effectiveness to over 99 percent, reducing sensitisation rates in at-risk pregnancies from 13–16% to 0.14–0.2%. The treatment was made available without patent licensing constraints, facilitating its rapid adoption as a global standard of care.

The speed and completeness of the disease's elimination in countries with routine access to RhoGAM is regarded as one of the most effective public health interventions of the twentieth century. In the United States, the treatment is estimated to prevent approximately USD $1 billion in annual healthcare costs associated with neonatal intensive care and long-term disability management.

== Career ==
=== Early life and training ===
John Grant Gorman was born c. 1931 in Bendigo, Victoria, Australia, into a family of medical professionals. Both parents were general practitioners; his father practised in Bendigo and maintained a particular interest in scientific questions that Gorman later cited as a formative influence, recalling that his father "was the one [who] inspired me, more than anything." He initially considered a career in engineering before following his parents into medicine, a transition he later described as "the path of least resistance."

Gorman completed his medical degree at the University of Melbourne in 1954, followed by a residency at St Vincent's Hospital, Melbourne, where early clinical encounters with Rh disease — then responsible for approximately ten percent of neonatal deaths in Melbourne — first directed his interest toward haematology and transfusion medicine. In 1955 he travelled to the United States, initially working in paediatrics at St. Francis Hospital in the South Bronx, New York, before joining Columbia-Presbyterian Medical Center in 1958.

=== Columbia-Presbyterian Medical Center (1958–1982) ===
In 1958, Gorman joined Columbia-Presbyterian Medical Center in New York as a resident in blood banking and laboratory medicine. It was during this early period at Columbia that he formulated the central theoretical insight that would underpin the eventual treatment for Rh disease: drawing on immunological principles described in Howard Florey's textbook and concepts of antibody-mediated immune suppression documented by Theobald Smith, Gorman proposed that passive administration of exogenous anti-D antibodies to Rh-negative mothers shortly after delivery could clear fetal red blood cells from the maternal circulation before the immune system mounted an active response — a counterintuitive approach that used the same antibody implicated in causing the disease to prevent it entirely.

He advanced to become Director of the Blood Bank at Presbyterian Hospital in 1964, overseeing transfusion services and interdisciplinary clinical research within the pathology department. In 1970 he was appointed Clinical Professor of Pathology at Columbia University College of Physicians and Surgeons, a position he held until 1982. His tenure at Columbia encompassed the full arc of the RhoGAM development programme — from theoretical formulation in 1958 through clinical trials, FDA approval in 1968, and the early years of global adoption. His contributions to the department are commemorated through the John Gorman Lectureship in Transfusion Medicine, established in 2016.

Notably, Gorman and Freda — alongside Columbia University as their institution — made the RhoGAM discovery available to patients without licensing fees or royalty payments, a decision compared by Columbia's Department of Pathology to Jonas Salk's approach to the polio vaccine.

=== New York University Medical Center (1982–1999) ===
Following his resignation from Columbia in 1982, Gorman continued his career in transfusion medicine as Director of the Blood Bank at New York University Medical Center, a position he held until 1999. During this seventeen-year tenure he oversaw blood banking and transfusion services at one of New York's principal academic medical centres, extending his operational and clinical contributions to laboratory haematology well beyond his foundational research years at Columbia. His directorship at NYU coincided with a period of significant change in transfusion medicine, including the introduction of universal HIV and hepatitis screening protocols following the blood supply contamination crisis of the early 1980s, and the subsequent development of nucleic acid amplification testing for donor blood.

== Awards and recognition ==
=== Lasker-DeBakey Clinical Medical Research Award (1980) ===
In 1980, Gorman shared the Lasker-DeBakey Clinical Medical Research Award with Cyril Clarke, Ronald Finn, Vincent Freda and William Pollack. The award citation recognised the group "for illuminating the genetics of the Rh factor and for directing essential research into hemolytic disease of the newborn, and for developing an anti-Rh vaccine, leading to the conquest of hemolytic disease of the newborn."

The Lasker Award is widely considered among the most prestigious prizes in biomedical science. Of its recipients since 1945, nearly thirty percent have subsequently received the Nobel Prize in Physiology or Medicine. The 1980 ceremony was attended by philanthropist Mary Lasker, cardiothoracic surgeon Michael DeBakey, U.S. Congressman John Brademas, and Nobel laureate Sune Bergström.

=== Honorary Companion of the Order of Australia (2024) ===
On 19 July 2024, the Australian Government announced Gorman's appointment as an Honorary Companion of the Order of Australia (AC), gazetted by the Governor-General on behalf of the King. The honorary distinction — reserved for non-residents or those of exceptional international merit — has previously been conferred upon Mother Teresa and Nelson Mandela.

The investiture was conducted on 30 August 2024 in California by Kevin Rudd, Australia's Ambassador to the United States. Australian Assistant Minister Patrick Gorman stated: "Dr Gorman gave the gift of life to millions. His determination to improve maternal healthcare is an inspiration to us all."

== Legacy and ongoing work ==
=== The unfinished problem ===
Despite the near-total elimination of Rh disease in high-income countries, the condition remains a significant and largely preventable cause of death and disability in low- and middle-income countries. Approximately 50 percent of at-risk women worldwide — around three million annually — do not receive Rh immune globulin, primarily due to cost, supply chain constraints, and the absence of universal screening programmes across sub-Saharan Africa, South Asia, and parts of Latin America. This gap results in an estimated 160,000 preventable fetal and neonatal deaths and 100,000 cases of lifelong neurological disability each year — figures that have remained largely static for decades.

Gorman has described the persistence of this access gap as the defining challenge of his later career. In published interviews, he has emphasised that the scientific and logistical barriers to elimination in the Global South are not insurmountable: the treatment is well understood, manufacturable at scale, and its efficacy is uncontested. The remaining obstacles are financial and organisational.

=== Worldwide Initiative for Rh Disease Eradication (WIRhE) ===
Gorman is a founding member and ongoing contributor to the Worldwide Initiative for Rh Disease Eradication (WIRhE), an international consortium of physicians, scientists and public health advocates working to extend access to Rh prophylaxis in low-resource settings. WIRhE coordinates research, policy advocacy, and funding initiatives aimed at establishing the infrastructure necessary for universal Rh screening and treatment across the Global South.

=== John Gorman Lectureship in Transfusion Medicine ===
In 2016, the Department of Pathology & Cell Biology at Columbia University Irving Medical Center established the John Gorman Lectureship in Transfusion Medicine, endowed in 2018 by Kedrion Biopharma, in recognition of Gorman's contributions to the field during his decades at Columbia. Speakers have included Nobel laureate Peter Agre (2018) and fetal medicine specialist Kenneth J. Moise Jr. (2022).

Since 2018, WIRhE has also hosted the John Gorman Lectureship as part of its BIRTH Congress series, with the fifth iteration held at the BIRTH Congress in Milan in 2022.

== Selected bibliography ==
- Gorman, J.G., Freda, V.J., & Pollack, W. (1963). "Prevention of sensitization of Rh-negative mothers by Rh-positive infants." Proceedings of the 9th Congress of the International Society of Haematology.
- Guthrie, Julian (2020). Good Blood: A Doctor, a Donor, and the Incredible Breakthrough That Saved Millions of Babies. New York. ISBN 978-1-4197-4331-3. OCLC 1140780842.
- Thompson, Gilbert (2014). Pioneers of Medicine Without a Nobel Prize. World Scientific. p. 163. ISBN 9781783263868.
