= Leonard Apt =

American pediatrician and ophthalmologist

- Born: June 28, 1922; Philadelphia
- Died: February 1, 2013 (aged 90); Santa Monica, California
- Known for: Apt test
- Scientific career
- Fields: Pediatrics, ophthalmology
- Institutions: David Geffen School of Medicine at UCLA

Leonard Apt (June 28, 1922 – February 1, 2013) was an American pediatrician and ophthalmologist. He was one of the first U.S. physicians to complete a fellowship in pediatric ophthalmology. Apt identified that povidone-iodine could be safety used as an antimicrobial for the eyes. In addition to his work in ophthalmology, Apt devised a number of diagnostic tests. The Apt test is performed on blood in a baby's stools to determine whether it is of maternal or fetal origin.

== Biography ==
Apt was born in Philadelphia. He started college at the University of Pennsylvania when he was 14. After graduating from Penn, he earned a medical degree from Jefferson Medical College in 1945. After residency training at Harvard University and the University of Cincinnati, he became the first pediatric ophthalmology fellow at the National Institutes of Health.

Associated with the David Geffen School of Medicine at UCLA from 1961 to his death, Apt established the pediatric ophthalmology division there, the first such division at a U.S. medical school. He was a co-founder of the Jules Stein Eye Institute at UCLA. Apt and a colleague, Sherwin Isenberg, examined the practice of instilling silver nitrate or antibiotics in the eye before an eye surgery. They found that such techniques increased the risk of infection. Apt proposed the use of povidone-iodine to treat or prevent eye infections. A 1990s study in Kenya established the solution as effective. The low cost of povidone-iodine provided another advantage for its use, especially in the developing world.

Early in Apt's career, eye surgeons commonly used sutures that were made of catgut or collagen materials. Some children experienced allergic reactions to these substances, sometimes leading to severe visual problems. Apt studied the problem and determined that a suture could first be placed in a child's forearm to observe for reactions. The AAP Section on Ophthalmology established the Leonard Apt, MD, Lectureship, which is delivered every two years at the meeting of the American Association for Pediatric Ophthalmology and Strabismus by a nationally known expert in a field related to pediatric ophthalmology.

Many of Apt's innovations were outside of pediatric ophthalmology. He was one of the early physicians to adopt the use of plastic tubing and containers in blood transfusions. Such transfusions had usually been given with glass or metal equipment. He was the first to report on a case of an immune system disorder known as agammaglobulinemia. The Apt test is performed when a newborn passes blood into the stool; it differentiates between swallowed maternal blood and blood originating from the newborn. Swallowing of maternal blood can occur at delivery, while infant gastrointestinal bleeding may account for blood coming from the baby.

In February 2013, Apt died of a brief heart-related illness in Santa Monica, California.
