= H. Michael Shepard =

American biologist

- Education: University of California, Davis; Indiana University Bloomington
- Known for: Co-development of Herceptin
- Awards: Lasker-DeBakey Clinical Medical Research Award (2019)

H. Michael Shepard (born 1949) is an American cancer researcher who was awarded the 2007 Harvard Medical School Warren Alpert Foundation Prize and the 2019 Lasker Clinical research award, which he shared with Dennis Slamon and Axel Ullrich for their development of Herceptin

== Education and career ==
Shepherd holds a bachelor's degree from the University of California, Davis, and a Ph.D. from Indiana University Bloomington in 1977. Dr. Shepard was a Damon Runyon Cancer Research Foundation Fellow at Indiana University Bloomington. His introduction to biotechnology came when he joined Genentech in 1980. Following Genentech, he has been a Founder or Principal in several biotech companies. These include Canji, Inc., NewBiotics, Receptor Biologix, and Halozyme.

== Development of Herceptin ==
Following Ullrich's characterization of the HER2 protooncogene, Shepard collaborated with Ullrich and Slamon to explore possible links to breast cancer. Slamon discovered, along with other colleagues in the field, that HER2 overexpression in breast cancer predicts shorter survival. However, a lot of proteins are overexpressed in cancer cells and correlate with shorter survival. Therefore, the remaining question was: Is the overexpression of HER2 a significant driver in tumor progression and how does this work? Shepard and Hudziak discovered that too much HER2 made tumor cells grow better. Then made a key discovery about how HER2 can cause resistance to immune cell killing of tumor cells. Overexpression of HER2 makes cells resistant to killing by macrophages, which are the first line of defense against cancer. This work was done in collaboration with Dr. Hans Schreiber at the University of Chicago. Shepard and colleagues at Genentech (Paul Carter, Gail Lewis) then invented Herceptin, the first monoclonal antibody that blocks a cancer-causing protein, and developed it into a life-saving therapy for women with breast cancer. The innovation reduces the risk of recurrence and extends survival time for patients with metastatic as well as early-stage disease. Every year, more than 50,000 women in the US are diagnosed with the type of breast cancer that the drug attacks, and over 2.3 million individuals have received the treatment since it became available.

== Other activity ==
Shepard has made seminal contributions to gene therapy of cancer, to tumor suppressor gene targeted small molecule therapeutics, and to drugs which target the tumor extracellular matrix. He continues his work, now expanding successful treatment paradigms used in cancer to approach inflammatory and autoimmune diseases. Shepard also consults for biopharma companies on how to develop meaningful biomarkers that will speed drug development. Education is another of Dr. Shepard's passions, and he gives lectures meant to teach, stimulate, excite and give hope to interested scientists and students, and to cancer patients who need to more about how the disease works. Dr. Shepard has co-authored many peer-reviewed publications and patents.

== Patents ==
- U.S. patent 7,138,388 — Methods to treat autoimmune and inflammatory conditions
- U.S. patent 7,105,156 — Method of using an adenoviral vector encoding a retinoblastoma protein to treat hyperproliferating cells
- U.S. patent 6,946,259 — Compositions and methods for treating cells having double minute DNA
- U.S. patent 6,683,061 — Enzyme catalyzed therapeutic activation
- U.S. patent 6,551,585 — Use of tumor necrosis factor as an adjuvant
- U.S. patent 6,495,553 — Methods and compositions for overcoming resistance to biologic and chemotherapy
- U.S. patent 6,399,063 — Monoclonal antibodies directed to the HER2 receptor
- U.S. patent 6,387,371 — Monoclonal antibodies directed to the HER2 receptor
- U.S. patent 6,348,352 — Methods for selectively transducing pathologic mammalian cells using a tumor suppressor gene
- U.S. patent 6,339,151 — Enzyme catalyzed therapeutic agents
- U.S. patent 6,333,169 — HER2 extracellular domain
- U.S. patent 6,331,524 — Organ-specific targeting of cationic amphiphile / DNA complexes for gene therapy
- U.S. patent 6,245,750 — Enzyme catalyzed therapeutic agents
- U.S. patent 6,165,464 — Monoclonal antibodies directed to the HER2 receptor
- U.S. patent 6,159,706 — Application of enzyme prodrugs as anti-infective agents
- U.S. patent 6,015,567 — HER2 extracellular domain
- U.S. patent 5,851,991 — Therapeutic use of the retinoblastoma susceptibility gene product
- U.S. patent 5,837,520 — Method of purification of viral vectors
- U.S. patent 5,772,997 — Monoclonal antibodies directed to the HER2 receptor
- U.S. patent 5,720,954 — Monoclonal antibodies directed to the HER2 receptor
- U.S. patent 5,710,255 — Characterization of a novel anti-p110.sup.RB monoclonal antibody
- U.S. patent 5,677,171 — Monoclonal antibodies directed to the HER2 receptor
- U.S. patent 4,963,354 — Use of tumor necrosis factor (TNF) as an adjuvant
- U.S. patent 4,808,402 — Method and compositions for modulating neovascularization
