= Alkali denaturation test =

Test to differentiate neonatal blood from maternal blood

- Purpose: differentiate neonatal from maternal blood

The alkali denaturation test, also known as A or Apt test, is a medical test used to differentiate fetal or neonatal blood from maternal blood found in a newborn's stool or vomit, or from maternal vaginal blood.

== History ==
The test was developed by Leonard Apt (1922–2013), an American pediatric ophthalmologist. The test was originally used to identify the source of bloody stools in newborn infants. It has been modified to distinguish fetal from maternal hemoglobin in blood samples from any source.

== Uses ==
It is used to differentiate whether the blood coming out of vagina is of the mother or fetus during delivery, i.e., placenta previa versus vasa previa. It is based on the principle that fetal HbF is resistant to acids and alkali whereas the mother's blood which has HbA is sensitive to acid and alkaline.

== Theory ==
The test is based on differences between maternal and fetal hemoglobin. Maternal blood contains adult hemoglobin composed of two alpha and two beta subunits (aka hemoglobin A or HbA; i.e., normal adult hemoglobin). Fetal blood contains fetal hemoglobin composed of two alpha and two gamma subunits (aka hemoglobin F or HbF; i.e., normal fetal hemoglobin). This difference in composition gives the different types of hemoglobin different chemical properties (in addition to the higher affinity HbF has for dissolved blood oxygen over HbA, allowing baby to extract oxygen from the mother's blood). Fetal hemoglobin is resistant to alkali (basic) denaturation, whereas adult hemoglobin is susceptible to such denaturation. Therefore, exposing the blood specimen to sodium hydroxide (NaOH) will denature the adult but not the fetal hemoglobin. The fetal hemoglobin will appear as a pinkish color under the microscope while the adult hemoglobin will appear as a yellow-brownish color.

== Method ==
The blood is mixed with a small amount of sterile water to cause hemolysis of the RBCs, yielding free hemoglobin. The sample is next centrifuged for several minutes. The pink hemoglobin-containing supernatant is then mixed with 1 mL of 1% NaOH for each 5 mL of supernatant. The color of the fluid is assessed after 2 minutes. Fetal hemoglobin will stay pink and adult hemoglobin will turn yellow-brown since adult hemoglobin is less stable and will convert to hematin which has a hydroxide ligand.

== See also ==
- Kleihauer-Betke test
