= Lasker–DeBakey Clinical Medical Research Award =

Biomedical award

Lasker–DeBakey Clinical Medical Research Award is one of four annual awards presented by the Lasker Foundation. The Lasker–DeBakey award is given to honor outstanding work for the understanding, diagnosis, prevention, treatment, and cure of disease. This award was renamed in 2008 in honor of Michael E. DeBakey. It was previously known as the Albert Lasker Award for Clinical Medical Research.

== List of past winners ==
- 1946 John Friend Mahoney, Karl Landsteiner (posthumously), Alexander S. Wiener, Philip Levine
- 1947 Thomas Francis Jr.
- 1948 not awarded
- 1949 Max Theiler, Edward C. Kendall, Philip S. Hench
- 1950 Georgios Papanikolaou
- 1951 Élise L'Esperance, Catharine Macfarlane, William G. Lennox, Frederic A. Gibbs
- 1952 Conrad A. Elvehjem, Frederick Sumner McKay, H. Trendley Dean
- 1953 Paul Dudley White
- 1954 Alfred Blalock, Helen B. Taussig, Robert E. Gross
- 1955 C. Walton Lillehei, Morley Cohen (de), Herbert E. Warden, Richard L. Varco, Hoffmann-La Roche Research Laboratories, Squibb Institute for Medical Research, Edward H. Robitzek, Irving Selikoff, Walsh McDermott, Carl Muschenheim
- 1956 Louis N. Katz, Jonas E. Salk, V. Everett Kinsey, Arnall Patz
- 1957 Rustom Jal Vakil, Nathan S. Kline, Robert H. Noce, Henri Laborit, Pierre Deniker, Heinz E. Lehmann, Richard E. Shope
- 1958 Robert W. Wilkins
- 1959 John Holmes Dingle, Gilbert Dalldorf, Robert Edward Gross
- 1960 Karl Paul Link, Irving S. Wright, Edgar V. Allen
- 1961 not awarded
- 1962 Joseph E. Smadel
- 1963 Michael E. DeBakey, Charles Huggins
- 1964 Nathan S. Kline
- 1965 Albert B. Sabin
- 1966 Sidney Farber
- 1967 Robert Allan Phillips
- 1968 John Heysham Gibbon
- 1969 George C. Cotzias
- 1970 Robert A. Good
- 1971 Edward D. Freis
- 1972 Min Chiu Li, Roy Hertz, Denis Burkitt, Joseph H. Burchenal, V. Anomah Ngu, John L. Ziegler, Edmund Klein, Emil Frei III, Emil J. Freireich, James F. Holland, Donald Pinkel, Paul P. Carbone, Vincent T. DeVita, Jr., Eugene J. Van Scott, Isaac Djerassi, C. Gordon Zubrod
- 1973 Paul M. Zoll, William B. Kouwenhoven
- 1974 John Charnley
- 1975 Godfrey N. Hounsfield, William Oldendorf
- 1976 Raymond P. Ahlquist, James W. Black
- 1977 Inge Edler, C. Hellmuth Hertz
- 1978 Michael Heidelberger, Robert Austrian, Emil C. Gotschlich
- 1979 not awarded
- 1980 Cyril A. Clarke, Ronald Finn, Vincent Freda, John G. Gorman, William Pollack
- 1981 Louis Sokoloff
- 1982 Roscoe O. Brady, Elizabeth F. Neufeld
- 1983 F. Mason Sones, Jr.
- 1984 Paul C. Lauterbur
- 1985 Bernard Fisher
- 1986 Myron Essex, Robert C. Gallo, Luc Montagnier
- 1987 Mogens Schou
- 1988 Vincent P. Dole
- 1989 Étienne-Émile Baulieu
- 1990 not awarded
- 1991 Yuet Wai Kan
- 1992 not awarded
- 1993 Donald Metcalf
- 1994 John Allen Clements
- 1995 Barry J. Marshall
- 1996 Porter Warren Anderson, Jr., David H. Smith (de), John B. Robbins, Rachel Schneerson
- 1997 Alfred Sommer
- 1998 Alfred G. Knudson Jr., Peter C. Nowell, Janet Rowley
- 1999 David W. Cushman, Miguel Ondetti
- 2000 Harvey J. Alter, Michael Houghton
- 2001 Robert Edwards
- 2002 Willem J. Kolff, Belding H. Scribner
- 2003 Marc Feldmann, Ravinder N. Maini
- 2004 Charles Kelman
- 2005 Alec Jeffreys, Edwin Southern
- 2006 Aaron T. Beck
- 2007 Alain Carpentier, Albert Starr
- 2008 Akira Endo
- 2009 Brian Druker, Nicholas Lydon, and Charles Sawyers
- 2010 Napoleone Ferrara
- 2011 Tu Youyou
- 2012 Roy Calne, Thomas E. Starzl
- 2013 Graeme Milbourne Clark, Ingeborg Hochmair, Blake S. Wilson
- 2014 Alim-Louis Benabid, Mahlon R. DeLong
- 2015 James P. Allison
- 2016 Ralf F. W. Bartenschlager, Charles M. Rice, Michael J. Sofia
- 2017 Douglas R. Lowy, John T. Schiller
- 2018 John B. Glen
- 2019 H. Michael Shepard, Dennis J. Slamon, Axel Ullrich
- 2020 not awarded
- 2021 Katalin Karikó, Drew Weissman
- 2022 Yuk Ming Dennis Lo
- 2023 James G. Fujimoto, David Huang, Eric A. Swanson
- 2024 Joel Habener, Lotte Bjerre Knudsen, Svetlana Mojsov
- 2025 Michael J. Welsh, Jesús (Tito) González, Paul A. Negulescu
- 2026 Kunihiro Hattori, Takehisa Kitazawa, Tomoyuki Igawa

== See also ==
- List of biomedical science awards
