= Fetal-maternal haemorrhage =

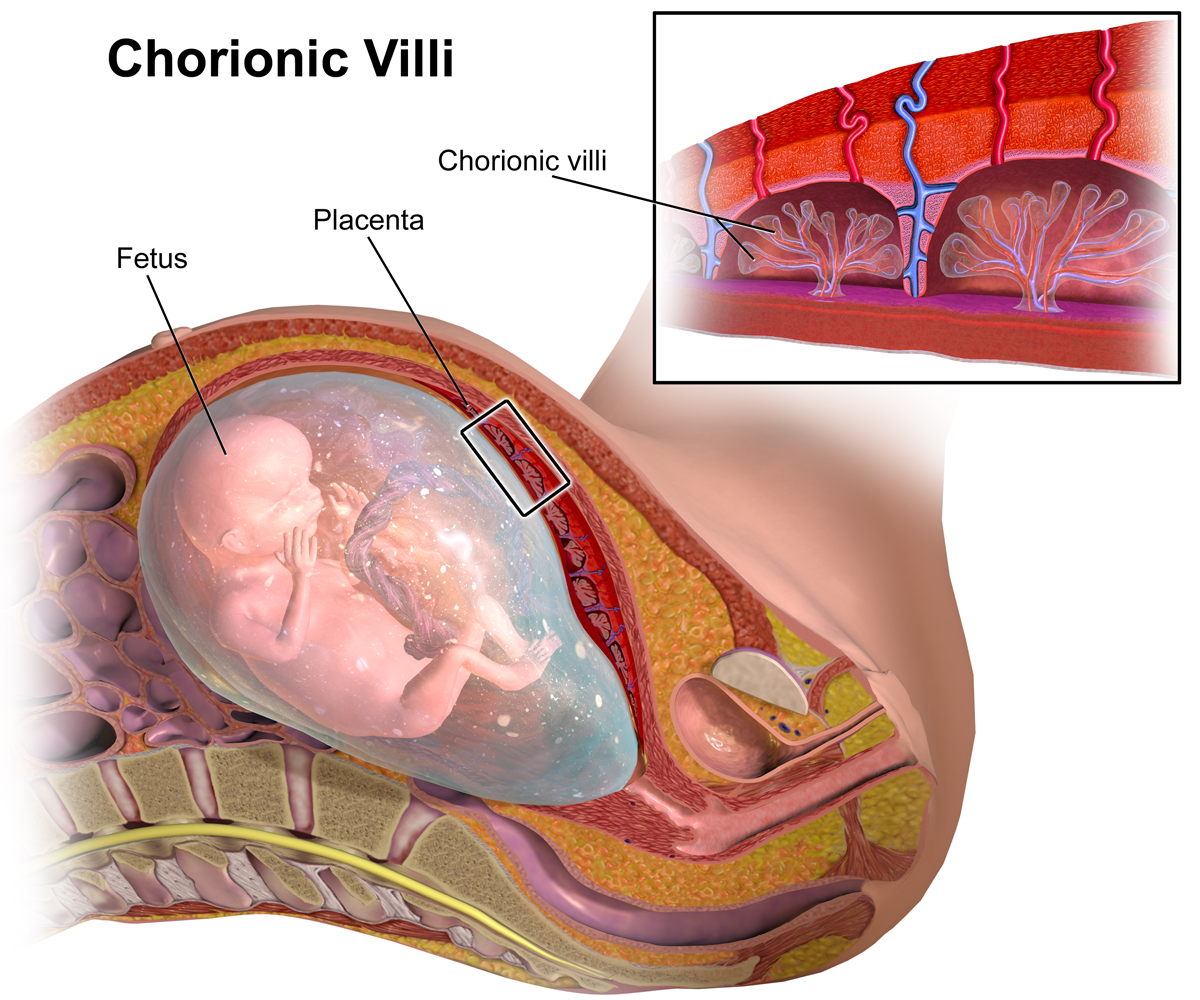
- Placenta with chorionic villi
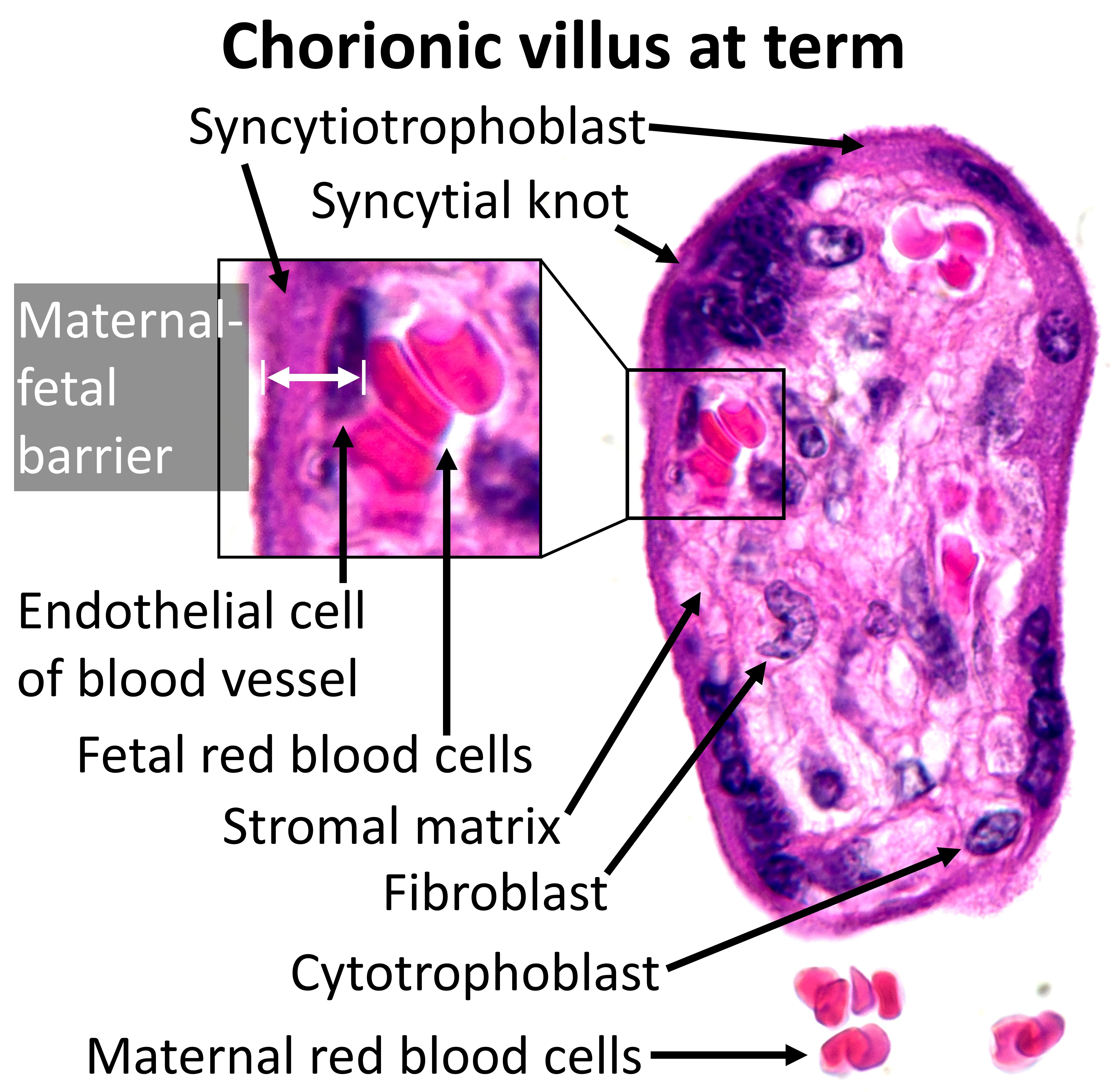
- High-magnification H&E micrograph of a chorionic villus of the placenta at term with main cell types. Insert shows the maternal-fetal barrier that mainly consists of syncytiotrophoblast and endothelial cells, keeping fetal blood separate from the surrounding maternal blood while letting oxygen and nutrients pass through. Cytotrophoblasts (one labeled near bottom) are scarce in late pregnancy.
- Specialty: Obstetrics

Fetal-maternal haemorrhage is the loss of fetal blood cells into the maternal circulation. It takes place in normal pregnancies as well as when there are obstetric or trauma related complications to pregnancy.

Normally the maternal circulation and the fetal circulation are kept from direct contact with each other, with gas and nutrient exchange taking place across a membrane in the placenta made of two layers, the syncytiotrophoblast and the cytotrophoblast. Fetal-maternal haemorrhage occurs when this membrane ceases to function as a barrier and fetal cells may come in contact with and enter the maternal vessels in the decidua/endometrium.

== Description ==
=== Normal pregnancy ===
It is estimated that less than 1ml of fetal blood is lost to the maternal circulation during normal labour in around 96% of normal deliveries. The loss of this small amount of blood may however be a sensitising event and stimulate antibody production to the foetal red blood cells, an example of which is Rhesus disease of the newborn.

=== Abnormal pregnancy ===
Causes of increased foetal-maternal haemorrhage are seen as a result of trauma, placental abruption or may be spontaneous with no cause found.

Up to 30ml of foetal-maternal transfusion may take place with no significant signs or symptoms seen in either mother or foetus. Loss in excess of this may result in significant morbidity and mortality to the fetus. Fetal-maternal haemorrhage is one cause of intrauterine death (IUD).

== Diagnosis ==
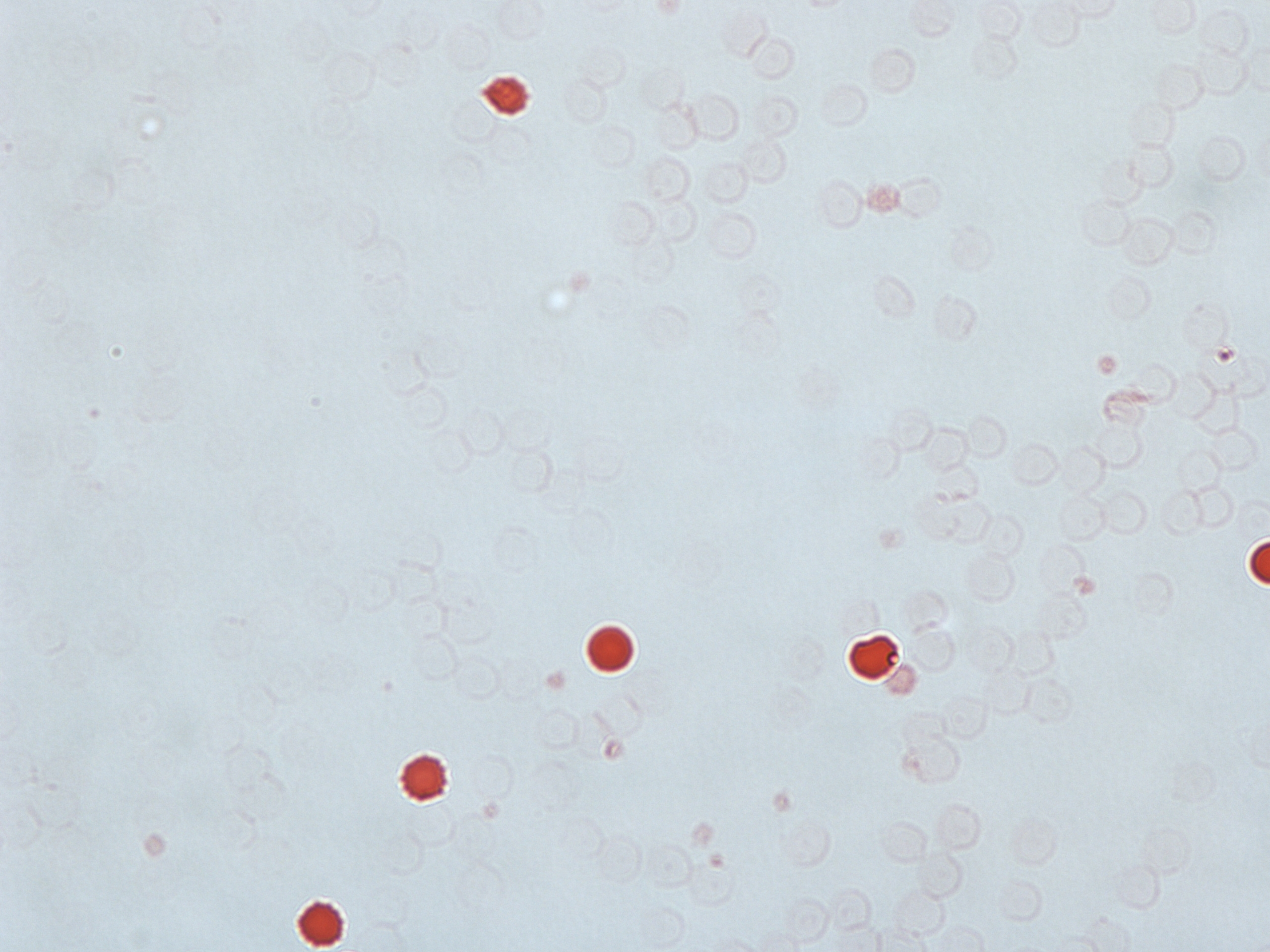
Kleihauer test, showing foetal red blood cells in rose-pink color, while adult red blood cells are only seen as "ghosts".

The Kleihauer–Betke test is a blood test used to measure the amount of foetal hemoglobin transferred from a foetus to its mother's bloodstream. It takes advantage of the differential resistance of foetal hemoglobin to acid. A standard blood smear is prepared from the mother's blood, and exposed to an acid bath. This removes adult hemoglobin, but not foetal hemoglobin, from the red blood cells. Subsequent staining, using Shepard's method, makes fetal cells (containing foetal hemoglobin) appear rose-pink in color, while adult red blood cells are only seen as "ghosts". 2000 cells are counted under the microscope and a percentage of foetal to maternal cells is calculated.

Fetal-maternal haemorrhage can also be diagnosed by flow cytometry, using anti-foetal hemoglobin antibodies (anti-HbF).

== Treatment ==
If ongoing and rapid haemorrhage is occurring then immediate delivery of the foetus may be indicated if the fetus is sufficiently developed. If the haemorrhage has already occurred and now stopped, an inutero transfusion of red cells to the foetus may be recommended.
