= Rozrolimupab =

Chemical compound

Monoclonal antibody
- Type: ?

Clinical data
- ATC code: none

Legal status
- Legal status: Investigational

Identifiers
- CAS Number: 909402-77-3
- ChemSpider: none
- UNII: S134V96RPQ
- KEGG: D09663

Chemical and physical data
- Molar mass: Antibodies 144.8–148.8 kg/mol

Rozrolimupab is a recombinant antibody mixture, specifically containing 25 Rhesus D, or RhD, human antibodies, and is currently under development by Symphogen for the treatment of immune thrombocytopenic purpura (ITP) and for the prevention of hemolytic disease of the newborn (HDN).

== Clinical trials ==
Phase two trials have proved to be promising. Utilizing a single intravenous infusion dosing, this phase was held in 41 centers across the United States, Europe, and Asia in order to evaluate an effective dose. The 61 patient study was assessing rozrolimupab's ability to effectively treat ITP and HDN as well as how safe and tolerable the drug is. Common adverse effects included mild to moderate headache, pyrexia, chills, and fatique. The study showed that administration of the drug did effect platelet responses in the blood, with a median time of response of roughly two and a half days, and on average lasting a total of 14 days.

== Current ITP and HDN treatment ==
While the current blood-derived treatment has proved successful, its dependence on a donor population proves problematic. Rozrolimupab's manufactured antibody mixture may be an alternative.
