= Vincent Freda =

American obstetrician

Vincent J. Freda (16 December 1927 – 7 May 2003) was an American obstetrician who shared the 1980 Lasker-DeBakey Clinical Medical Research Award for pioneering work on the rhesus blood group system, the role of rhesus D antibodies in the causation of Rh disease and the prevention of Rh disease. He graduated from Columbia University and the New York University School of Medicine.
