= Lacy Overby =

Virologist (1920–1994)

- Born: 27 July 1920
- Died: 5 December 1994 (aged 74)
- Education: Vanderbilt University
- Known for: Hepatitis B Hepatitis C
- Awards: Karl Landsteiner Memorial Award (1992)
- Scientific career
- Fields: Virology
- Workplaces: Chiron Corporation

Lacy Rasco Overby (27 July 1920 – 5 December 1994) was an American virologist known for his contributions to Hepatitis B and Hepatitis C research.

Overby earned bachelor's, master's and doctorate degrees in science and physics at Vanderbilt University (BA, 1941; MS, 1945; PhD, 1951).

Overby was awarded the Karl Landsteiner Memorial Award of the American Association of Blood Banks in 1992 together with Harvey J. Alter, Daniel W. Bradley, Qui-Lim Choo, Michael Houghton and George Kuo.
