= Karl Landsteiner Memorial Award =

The Karl Landsteiner Memorial Award is a scientific award given by the American Association of Blood Banks (AABB) to scientists with "an international reputation in transfusion medicine or cellular therapies" "whose original research resulted in an important contribution to the body of scientific knowledge". Recipients give a lecture at the AABB Annual Meeting and receive a $7,500 honorarium. The prize was initiated in 1954 to honor Karl Landsteiner, whose research laid the foundation for modern blood transfusion therapy. In 2023, the AABB renamed the Karl Landsteiner Memorial Award as the Landsteiner-Alter Award in honor of both Karl Landsteiner and Harvey J. Alter.

== Recipients ==
- 1954 Reuben Ottenberg
- 1955 Richard Lewisohn
- 1956 Philip Levine, Alexander Solomon Wiener
- 1957 Ruth Sanger, Robert Russell Race
- 1958 Oswald Hope Robertson, Francis Peyton Rous, J. R. Turner
- 1959 Ernest Witebsky
- 1960 Patrick L. Mollison
- 1961 Robin Coombs
- 1962 William C. Boyd
- 1963 Fred H. Allen Jr., Louis K. Diamond
- 1964 J. J. van Loghem
- 1965 Ruggero Ceppellini
- 1966 Elvin A. Kabat
- 1967 Walter Morgan, Winifred Watkins
- 1968 Rodney R. Porter
- 1969 Vincent J. Freda, John G. Gorman, William Pollack
- 1970 Jean Dausset
- 1971 Bruce Chown, Marion Lewis
- 1972 Richard E. Rosenfield
- 1973 Arthur E. Mourant
- 1974 Manfred M. Mayer, Hans J. Müller-Eberhard
- 1975 Baruch S. Blumberg, Alfred M. Prince
- 1976 Marie Cutbush Crookston, Eloise R. Giblett
- 1977 Rose Payne, Jon van Rood
- 1978 Fred Stratton
- 1979 Nevin C. Hughes-Jones, Serafeim P. Masouredis
- 1980 Donald M. Marcus, James M. Stavely
- 1981 James F. Danielli, S. Jonathan Singer
- 1982 Georges J. F. Köhler, César Milstein
- 1983 Vincent T. Marchesi
- 1984 Oliver Smithies
- 1985 Saul Krugman
- 1986 Claes F. Högman, Grant R. Bartlett
- 1987 E. Donnall Thomas
- 1988 Charles P. Salmon
- 1989 George W. Bird
- 1990 Robert Gallo, Luc Montagnier
- 1991 Paul I. Terasaki
- 1992 Harvey J. Alter, Daniel W. Bradley, Qui-Lim Choo, Michael Houghton, George Kuo, Lacy Overby
- 1993 C. Paul Engelfriet
- 1994 Kenneth Brinkhous, Harold Roberts, Robert Wagner, Robert Langdell
- 1995 W. Laurence Marsh
- 1996 Eugene Goldwasser
- 1997 Wendell F. Rosse
- 1998 Richard H. Aster, Scott Murphy, Sherrill J. Slichter
- 1999 Kary B. Mullis
- 2000 Michael E. DeBakey
- 2001 John Bowman
- 2002 Hal E. Broxmeyer
- 2003 Victor A. McKusick
- 2004 Tibor Greenwalt
- 2005 Peter Agre
- 2006 James D. Watson
- 2007 Peter Issitt
- 2008 Ernest Beutler
- 2009 Curt I. Civin
- 2010 Steven A. Rosenberg
- 2011 David Weatherall, Yuet Wai Kan
- 2012 Kenneth Kaushansky
- 2013 Barry S. Coller
- 2014 Carl June
- 2015 Nancy C. Andrews
- 2016 Stuart Orkin
- 2017 Irving Weissman
- 2018 David A. Williams
- 2019 David Anstee, Jean-Pierre Cartron, Colvin Redman, Fumiichiro Yamamoto
- 2020 Katherine A. High
- 2021 Anneke Brand
- 2022 Jeffrey L. Carson, Paul C. Hébert, Nancy Heddle, Ian Roberts

== See also ==
- List of medicine awards
