= Dana Devine =

American-born Canadian immunologist (died 2024)

- Born: October 5, 1956 (New Bedford, Mass.)
- Died: November 12, 2024
- Education: Boston University (BA, MA); Duke University (PhD)
- Awards: Queen’s Golden Jubilee Award; 2015 Ortho Award, Canadian Society for Transfusion Medicine AABB Hemphill-Jordan Leadership Award, 2021
- Scientific career
- Fields: Transfusion medicine
- Workplaces: AABB; University of British Columbia; Canadian Blood Services

Dana Devine (1956-2024) was an American-born Canadian blood transfusion researcher and the president of AABB. She was the editor-in-chief of Vox Sanguinis from 2012 to 2020. Devine was also the Chief Scientist at Canadian Blood Services and the director of the Centre for Blood Research at the University of British Columbia. In 2015, she was elected as a fellow of the Canadian Academy of Health Sciences. In 2022, she was elected as the President of the Biomedical Excellence for Safer Transfusion Collaborative.

== Education ==
Under the direction of Dr. Wendell F. Roose, Devine received her Ph.D. in immunology from Duke University in 1986. She previously completed a bachelor's degree in biology and a master's degree in marine biology, both at Boston University.

== Research and career ==
Devine first joined Canadian Blood Services (CBS) in 1999, following its creation as a result of the Krever Inquiry, as the executive director of research and development. As director, she was instrumental in the development of the CBS’ accomplished Centre for Innovation, including its netCAD Blood4Research facility in Vancouver which is recognized globally for its work to drive innovation in transfusion medicine by collecting blood for research in blood collection, manufacturing, and storage. Other countries are taking inspiration from this model, including the U.S. and Australia. She was vice-president of medical, scientific, and research affairs for 11 years before becoming Chief Scientist. Her work at CBS included improvements to testing for transfusion transmitted infection, donor and transplantation services, surveillance and epidemiology, and improvements to platelet unit manufacturing processes. Also in response to the Krever Inquiry, Devine co-founded the Centre for Blood Research in 2002. In 2021, she became its director.

Devine was elected president of AABB in 2020 and took office in October 2021. She was previously a vice-president of AABB. An AABB member since 1998, Dana recognized the challenges that the field was facing, including the maintenance of a stable and adequate blood supply, ensuring a sufficient and well-trained workforce, and advancing research. As President, Devine committed to being an advocate for research in this field, suggesting that the challenges being faced could be addressed through innovation.

For her "critical scientific leadership to Canada’s blood system," Devine was elected a fellow of the Canadian Academy of Health Sciences in 2015.

Devine joined the University of British Columbia's Department of Pathology and Laboratory Medicine in 2000, and served as the Graduate Studies Program Director.

Devine's research specialties were in blood system management and quality improvement, platelet biology and coagulation, and complement biochemistry. She was President of the Biomedical Excellence for Safer Transfusion (BEST) Collaborative, where her projects focused on improving the processing, quality, and utilization of conventional blood components. She attended her first BEST meeting in 2002, subsequently joining the Conventional Components team under the direction of Dr. Sherrill Slitchter and Nancy Heddle. Following this she co-led the team with Dr. Pieter van der Meer. Devine's efforts with BEST as an executive led to the publishing of papers in notable journals. As President, Devine was keen on leading Best Collaborative to address pressing issues in the community including the loss of DEHP from blood storage containers and reminding blood operators of the need to revalidate everything that they make.

Her laboratory at the University of British Columbia was focused on improving the storage quality of platelet units. Devine was also involved in research on the use of convalescent plasma to treat COVID-19, as well as research using Raman spectroscopy to assess the quality of stored red blood cells.

Devine was a member of various boards for biotechnology companies and blood operators. Devine was the chair of the medical advisory board for Macopharma, a transfusion product company based in Lille, France. She also served as a member of the board of directors for a gene therapy start-up based in Boston, US, STMR.Bio. She sat on the research advisory boards for blood operators, including the Australian Red Cross Lifeblood, Vitalant, and the Bloodworks Northwest (formerly Puget Sound Blood Centre). Devine chaired the medical advisory committee for the largest blood operator in the United States, the American Red Cross.

Devine was credited with over one-hundred paper publications in scientific journals. Her publications have garnered over ten-thousand citations. Her most cited paper is title "Clinical outcomes following institution of the Canadian universal leukoreduction program for red blood cell transfusions", with over 400 citations.

Devine retired from Canadian Blood Services in 2023. She died on November 12, 2024. In 2024, Canadian Blood Services and the Canadian Society of Transfusion Medicine jointly introduced the Dana Devine Award to further careers in transfusion research.
