= John Maxwell Bowman =

Canadian pediatrician (1925–2005)

John Maxwell "Jack" Bowman (24 May 1925, Winnipeg – 22 May 2005, Winnipeg) was a Canadian pediatrician, medical researcher, and professor of medicine. He was an internationally recognized expert in the treatment and prevention of Rh disease in newborns.

== Biography ==
After secondary education at Gordon Bell High School, Bowman studied medicine at the University of Manitoba Medical College with M.D. in 1949. After serving his medical internship at Winnipeg General Hospital, he spent two years in rural general practice in Oakville, Manitoba. He then trained as a pediatrician at the Children's Hospital of Winnipeg, at the Winnipeg General Hospital's Newborn Service and Rh Laboratory, and at the Babies Hospital of Columbia Presbyterian Medical Center. He became a certified pediatrician in 1956 and then from 1956 to 1957 studied and lectured in clinical pediatrics at Queen's University in Kingston, Ontario. In 1957 he joined his identical twin brother William David "Bill" Bowman (1925–2011) in the pediatric department of the Manitoba Medical Clinic. In 1957 J. M. Bowman began working as a part-time associate with Bruce Chown and Marion Lewis at Winnipeg's Rh Laboratory and as a part-time member of the University of Manitoba's pediatric department.

From 1961 to 1996 Jack Bowman was the Rh Laboratory's medical director. In 1967 he resigned from the Manitoba Medical Clinic to become a full professor in the University of Manitoba's pediatric department, holding the professorship until his retirement in 1996. He also served until 1982 as the medical director of the Manitoba Red Cross Blood Services.

In 1969, Dr. Bowman co-founded the Winnipeg Rh Institute, a private, non-profit institute supporting research and development of blood and blood related products. With his assistance, the Rh Institute introduced the column chromatographic method of blood fractionation to North America in 1972.

He was one of the main contributors to Cangene Corporation's development and licensing in Canada in 1980 of WinRho, in which "Win" represents Winnipeg. He was an active lecturer during his retirement and gave his last lecture 3 days before his death.

Upon his death he was survived by three daughters, a son, and eight grandchildren. He was predeceased by his wife, a son, and a granddaughter.

== Awards and honours ==
- 1977 — Queen Elizabeth II Silver Jubilee Medal
- 1983 — Officer of the Order of Canada
- 1986 — Fellow of the Royal Society of Canada
- 1996 — Provost in the Manitoba Order of the Buffalo Hunt
- 1996 — F.N.G. Starr Award
- 2001 — Karl Landsteiner Memorial Award

== Selection publications ==
- with Janet M. Pollock: Bowman, J. M.; Pollock, J. M. (18 March 1978). "Antenatal prophylaxis of Rh isoimmunization: 28-weeks'-gestation service program". Can Med Assoc J. 118 (6): 627–630. PMC 1818036. PMID 77715.
- with Janet M. Pollock, Frank A. Manning, Chris R. Harman, and Savas Menticoglou: Bowman, J. M.; Pollock, J. M.; Manning, F. A.; Harman, C. R.; Menticoglou, S. (February 1992). "Maternal Kell blood group alloimmunization". Obstetrics and Gynecology. 79 (2): 239–244. PMID 1731292.
- with V. de Almeida: De Almeida, V.; Bowman, J. M. (March 1994). "Massive fetomaternal hemorrhage: Manitoba experience". Obstet Gynecol. 83 (3): 323–328. PMID 8127519.
