= Anneke Brand =

Dutch physician-scientist

- Born: 7 June 1946; The Hague, Netherlands
- Died: 2021 (aged 74–75)
- Scientific career
- Fields: Medicine, Transfusion Medicine, Hematology

Anneke Brand (1946 – 2021) was a Dutch physician-scientist whose work on platelet and red blood cell transfusion and cord blood transplantation earned her transfusion medicine's three highest honors: the AABB Karl Landsteiner Memorial Award; International Society of Blood Transfusion Presidential Award; and the British Blood Transfusion Society James Blundell Award.

== Early life and education ==
Brand was born on 7 June 1946 in The Hague, the Netherlands. In 1973, she obtained her medical degree from the Free University Amsterdam. Brand earned her Ph.D. in 1978 from the Leiden Academic Hospital under Professors Jon van Rood and George Eernisse, on the topic of 'Platelet Supportive Care'. Brand trained in internal medicine in Haarlem and in hematology at the Leiden Academic Hospital.

== Career ==
Brand studied the management of platelet refractoriness and the role of leukocytes in erythrocyte alloimmunization and transfusion outcomes. She helped establish the need for leukoreduction to diminish transfusion reactions. She studied the optimal conditions for the storage and expansion of cord blood for transplantation, along with platelets and red cells for transfusion.

Brand developed peri-operative blood management strategies and co-directed clinical platelet transfusion trials. She studied non-inherited maternal antigens and factors that influence erythrocyte alloimmunization. She was the senior author on the MATCH study, which looked at whether red cell units should be matched only for ABO and RhD, or for additional erythrocyte antigens such as c, C, E, K, Fy(a), Jk(a), and S.

Brand co-authored over 350 papers, helped found the Dutch Cord Blood Bank, served on the board of the European Hematology Association from 2011 to 2015, and helped develop educational programs for training physicians and laboratory technologists.

== Awards ==
- James Blundell Award of the British Blood Transfusion Society (2009)
- Presidential Award of the International Society of Blood Transfusion (2020)
- Karl Landsteiner Memorial Award (2021)
