= Marion Lewis =

Canadian medical researcher (1925–2025)

Marion Jean Lewis OC OM FRSC (September 21, 1925 – October 18, 2025) was a Canadian medical researcher, known for her work on the Rh factor and on the Duffy antigen system.

== Life and career ==
Lewis graduated from Winnipeg's Gordon Bell High School in 1943. She was trained as a medical technician at Winnipeg General Hospital. In 1944, the pediatric pathologist Bruce Chown, assisted by Lewis, opened the Rh Laboratory in Winnipeg to study and eradicate Rh disease. Their research led to effective treatments and a vaccine that prevents Rh disease.

In 1950–51, Lewis spent four months at an Italian university studying the Italian language and culture. She then spent another three months studying in London under world-renowned ‘blood groupers’ Robert Race and Ruth Sanger. In 1951, she returned to Winnipeg and the Rh lab. From 1952 and 1960, Chown and Lewis made annual trips, visiting Canadian tribal groups, including the Blackfoot and Cree, to test their blood for Rh factors. They also tested Inuit at Kugluktuk and Southampton Island and Hutterites in Manitoba.

While Chown retired in 1977, Lewis continued on in the field of blood group gene mapping and eventually branched out into the field of genetics. She and her colleagues at the Rh Laboratory, including Hiroko Kaita, became internationally renowned for their work.

In the Department of Pediatrics at the University of Manitoba's the Faculty of Medicine, Lewis was an assistant professor from 1973 to 1977, an associate professor from 1977 to 1984, and a full professor from 1984 to 1996, when she retired as professor emerita. She was the author or co-author of more than 140 articles.

On 27 June 2019, Lewis was appointed an Officer to the Order of Canada for her contributions to the prevention and treatment of Rh disease. In 2020, Lewis was appointed a member of the Order of Manitoba.

Lewis died in Winnipeg on October 18, 2025, at the age of 100.

== Awards and honours ==
- 1971 – Karl Landsteiner Memorial Award of the American Association of Blood Banks (AABB)
- 1986 – honorary D.Sc. from the University of Winnipeg
- 1993 – election as a Fellow of the Royal Society of Canada
- 1996 – Emily Cooley Memorial Award of the AABB
- 2019 – Officer of the Order of Canada
- 2020 – Member of the Order of Manitoba
