= Tibor J. Greenwalt =

American hematologist

Tibor Jack Greenwalt
- Greenwalt circa 2002
- Born: January 23, 1914; Budapest, Hungary
- Died: July 17, 2005 (aged 91); Cincinnati, Ohio, United States
- Education: New York University (BA, 1933); New York University Medical School (MD, 1937)
- Children: 1
- Awards: Fellow, American Association for the Advancement of Science (1977); Member, National Academy of Medicine (1984); Karl Landsteiner Memorial Award (2004)
- Scientific career
- Fields: Hematology, transfusion medicine
- Workplaces: Marquette University School of Medicine (1948–1966); American Red Cross (1967–1979); George Washington University School of Medicine (1967–1979); University of Cincinnati (1979–2005)

Tibor Jack Greenwalt (January 23, 1914 – July 17, 2005) was an American hematologist who specialized in transfusion medicine. Greenwalt earned his medical degree from New York University Medical School in 1937 and completed a hematology fellowship under William Dameshek. After serving as a US Army physician in World War I, he settled in Milwaukee, Wisconsin, where he became a professor of medicine at the Marquette University School of Medicine. He was a founding member of the American Association of Blood Banks and served as president of the International Society of Blood Transfusion from 1966 to 1972.

In 1967, he moved to Washington, D.C., where he became the national director of the American Red Cross's blood program and taught at the George Washington University School of Medicine. After retiring from the Red Cross in 1979, he moved to Cincinnati, Ohio, where he became emeritus professor of internal medicine and pathology at the University of Cincinnati. In a scientific career spanning 60 years, he contributed to the understanding of hemolytic disease of the newborn, the genetics of human blood groups, and the storage of donor blood, among other topics. He was a fellow of the American Association for the Advancement of Science and a member of the National Academy of Medicine.

== Early life and education ==
Greenwalt was born on January 23, 1914, in Budapest, Hungary. In 1920, during a period of political and economic turmoil following World War I, his family moved to the United States. After graduating from high school he took up a job as a shoe salesman, but later chose to study chemistry at New York University. He graduated in 1933 and enrolled in New York University Medical School, earning his MD in 1937. He completed his internship at Mt. Sinai Hospital and Kings County Hospital, and his residency at Montefiore Hospital. Later he pursued a fellowship in hematology under William Dameshek at the New England Medical Center. Greenwalt's early research helped to establish that hemolytic disease of the newborn (then known as "erythroblastosis fetalis") was a hemolytic anemia.

== Career ==
Greenwalt was drafted into the US Army during World War II. Trained in New Orleans, he served in administrative roles at military hospitals in Fort Leavenworth, Kansas and, later, near Karachi. After his return in 1946 he opened a hematology practice in Milwaukee, Wisconsin. Over the next year Greenwalt founded the Milwaukee Blood Center and became a founding member of the American Association of Blood Banks (AABB). He began working as a clinical instructor at the Marquette University School of Medicine in 1948 and taught there until 1966, eventually becoming full professor. In Milwaukee he continued his research on HDN and worked alongside R.R. Race, Ruth Sanger and Arthur Mourant in the study of blood groups. He also developed a filter to remove white blood cells from donor blood to mitigate transfusion reactions (a process known as leukoreduction). He established a rare donor registry at the AABB in 1959, and published papers on the management of blood banks. In 1960 he became the founding editor of the journal Transfusion, and he was appointed president of the International Society of Blood Transfusion in 1966, serving in that role until 1972.

In 1967, Greenwalt relocated to Washington, D.C. to serve as the national director of the American Red Cross's blood program, where he worked to establish another rare donor registry. His areas of research while in Washington included serologic testing methods and hepatitis screening. He was a clinical professor of medicine at the George Washington University School of Medicine from 1967 until he left the Red Cross in 1979 and took up the role of medical director of the Hoxworth Blood Bank at the University of Cincinnati. In 1987 he retired from that post to become research director at Hoxworth. In his later career he developed methods for extending the storage life of red blood cells. He was made an emeritus professor of internal medicine and pathology at the University of Cincinnati in 2003, and continued working in this role until his death at the age of 91.

Greenwalt was elected a fellow of the American Association for the Advancement of Science in 1977. In 1984 he was elected to the National Academy of Medicine, and he received the AABB's Karl Landsteiner Memorial Award in 2004. The AABB's Tibor Greenwalt Memorial Award And Lectureship is dedicated to him.

== Personal life ==
Greenwalt married four times; he was widowed by his first, third, and fourth wives, and his second marriage ended in divorce. He had a son from his first marriage.

Greenwalt died of congestive heart failure in Cincinnati, Ohio on July 17, 2005.

== Selected publications ==
- Dameshek, W; Greenwalt, T.J.; Tat, R.J. (1943). "Erythroblastosis foetalis (acute hemolytic anemia of the newborn): preliminary report". American Journal of Diseases of Children. 65 (4): 571–581. doi:10.1001/archpedi.1943.02010160055006.
- Greenwalt, T.J.; Sasaki, T.; Sanger, R; Sneath, J.; Race, R. R. (1954). "An allele of the S(s) blood group genes". Proceedings of the National Academy of Sciences of the United States of America. 40 (12): 1126–1129. Bibcode:1954PNAS...40.1126G. doi:10.1073/pnas.40.12.1126. PMC 1063978. PMID 16589599.
- Greenwalt, T.J. (1961). "Confirmation of linkage between the Lutheran and secretor genes". American Journal of Human Genetics. 13 (1): 69–88. PMC 1932094. PMID 13708363.
- Greenwalt, T.J.; Bryan, D.J.; Dumaswala, U.J. (1984). "Erythrocyte membrane vesiculation and changes in membrane composition during storage in citrate-phosphate-dextrose-adenine-1". Vox Sanguinis. 47 (4): 261–270. doi:10.1111/j.1423-0410.1984.tb01596.x. PMID 6485302. S2CID 27349669.
- Greenwalt, T.J. (2006). "The how and why of exocytic vesicles". Transfusion. 46 (1): 143–152. doi:10.1111/j.1537-2995.2006.00692.x. PMID 16398744. S2CID 10202600.
