= Greenwalt =

Greenwalt is a surname. Notable people with the surname include:

- David Greenwalt (born 1949), American screenwriter, director, and producer
- G. C. Greenwalt (1889–1979), American politician and military officer
- Tibor J. Greenwalt (1914–2005), American hematologist

== See also ==
- Greenwald (disambiguation)
