= Sherrill Slichter =

American physician

Sherrill Slichter was an American physician whose work on platelet biology earned her transfusion medicine’s three highest honors: the AABB Karl Landsteiner Memorial Award; International Society of Blood Transfusion Presidential Award; and the British Blood Transfusion Society James Blundell Award.

== Education ==
Slichter earned her M.D. from George Washington University. She did her residency in Internal Medicine at Mt. Sinai Hospital, New York and Parkland Hospital in Dallas, and her fellowship in Hematology/Oncology at the University of Washington, where she stayed on faculty.

== Career ==
In her early work, Slichter measured survival and turnover of platelets and fibrinogen. She characterized three types of bleeding problems: platelet and fibrinogen consumption, selective platelet destruction, and fibrinolysis. Slichter studied the performance of laboratory tests of platelet function such as the bleeding time. She showed that in patients with artificial heart valves, platelets were consumed by interaction with the valves proportionately to the surface area of the valve. In patients with immune thrombocytopenia, Slichter infused radiolabeled autologous platelets and measured platelet-associated immunoglobulin levels. She found that prednisone improved platelet counts primarily by increasing platelet production, whereas splenectomy prolonged platelet survival. Slichter's work helped establish the utility of single-donor apheresis platelets and the appropriateness of platelet transfusion in various clinical settings. Slichter was the lead author on the Trial to Reduce Alloimmunization to Platelets (TRAP) study, which evaluated the utility of leukoreduction and ultraviolet irradiation for reducing platelet refractoriness. She was also lead author on the Optimal Platelet Dose Strategy for Management of Thrombocytopenia (PLADO) trial, which evaluated bleeding outcomes to determine the optimal frequency and dose of platelet transfusion for patients undergoing chemotherapy. She continued to study how platelet dose, source (apheresis vs pooled), donor-recipient ABO compatibility, and duration of storage impacted bleeding outcomes in adults and children.

Slichter titled her autobiography Path of Persistence: Gender Trailblazer and Platelet Pioneer. In it, Slichter described how she became a "world-renowned platelet pioneer, and a trailblazer for women in medicine" while researching how to extend the shelf-life of platelets, from cold stored to freeze-dried.

== Works ==
Path of Persistence: Gender Trailblazer and Platelet Pioneer, Bloodworks Northwest, 2017. ISBN 978-0692867945

== Awards ==
- America's Blood Centers Thomas F. Zuck Lifetime Achievement Award, 2018
- American Society of Hematology Henry M. Stratton Medal, 2017
- American Association of Blood Banks Karl Landsteiner Memorial Award, 1998
- International Society of Blood Transfusion Presidential Award, 2008
- British Blood Transfusion Society James Blundell Award, 2011
