= Fred Stratton =

Frederick Stratton (8 October 1913 – 2 April 2001) was an English haematologist and an internationally recognized expert in blood transfusion. He is known for discovering one of the Rh allelomorphs.

Stratton was born in Levenshulme, Manchester, England. After education at the Central Manchester Grammar School, he matriculated in 1931 at the University of Manchester, graduating in 1934 with BSc. He then studied medicine at the medical school of the University of Manchester, qualifying there MB ChB Manchester in 1937. After a brief time as a general practitioner, he joined in 1940 the Manchester Blood Depot as a medical officer and was soon appointed deputy to the director, John Frederick Wilkinson (1897–1998). In 1946 Stratton was appointed regional blood transfusion officer. He was the director of the Manchester Blood Centre from 1949 to 1980. With his deputy directory, Peter H. Renton, he wrote the important book Practical Blood Grouping (Oxford, Blackwell Scientific Publishing, 1958).

Stratton received his DPH in 1939, his research MD degree in 1944, and his DSc in 1957.

The University of Manchester granted him, in 1977, a personal chair in human serology. He was an early researcher into the human blood groups and discovered the rhesus subtype Du. He spent many years investigating the importance of complement in relation to blood group reactions and preparing sophisticated reagents for the detection of complement dependent reactions.

In 1947 he married Louisa A. Pineger in Ashton-under-Lyne. They had two sons.

Fred Stratton's papers are held at the University of Manchester Library (uncatalogued).

== Awards and honours ==
- 1963 — FRCPath
- 1963 — Percy Oliver Memorial Award of the Royal College of Pathologists
- 1966 — FRCP
- 1978 — Karl Landsteiner Memorial Award of the American Association of Blood Banks
- 1987 — James Blundell Award of the British Blood Transfusion Society
