= Scott Murphy (disambiguation) =

Scott Murphy (born 1970) is a member of the United States House of Representatives from New York.

Scott Murphy may also refer to:

- Scott Murphy (musician) (born 1979), American singer-songwriter
- Scott Murphy (physician) (1936–2006), American hematologist and medical researcher
- Scott Murphy (video game designer) (born 1954), American video game designer
