= Chiron Corporation =

American biotechnology firm (1981–2006)

- Logo used until 2006
- Type: Subsidiary
- Industry: Biotechnology
- Founded: 1981
- Defunct: April 20, 2006; 20 years ago
- Fate: Acquired by Novartis in 2006.; In 2014, its assets related to blood testing and vaccines subsequently sold to Grifols and GlaxoSmithKline, respectively.
- Headquarters: Emeryville, California, USA
- Products: Biopharmaceuticals, vaccines, blood testing
- Revenue: ▲$1.921 billion (2005)
- Number of employees: 5,400 (2005)
- Website: www.chiron.com

Chiron Corporation (/ˈkaɪrɒn/ KY-ron) was an American multinational biotechnology firm founded in 1981, based in Emeryville, California, that was acquired by Novartis on April 20, 2006. It had offices and facilities in eighteen countries on five continents. Chiron's business and research was in three main areas: biopharmaceuticals, vaccines, and blood testing. Chiron's vaccines and blood testing units were combined to form Novartis Vaccines and Diagnostics, while Chiron BioPharmaceuticals was integrated into Novartis Pharmaceuticals. In 2014, Novartis completed the sale of its blood transfusion diagnostics unit to Grifols and announced agreements for the sale of its vaccines unit to GlaxoSmithKline.

== Early history ==
Chiron was founded in 1981 by chairman, William J. Rutter, president and chief executive, Professor Edward Penhoet, and vice president for research, Pablo DT Valenzuela. All were academics from the University of California; Penhoet at Berkeley, where he continued to lecture, and the others from San Francisco. Chiron formed a partnership with the Swiss pharmaceutical giant, Ciba-Geigy Ltd., through the Biocine Company, to use genetic engineering to develop vaccines and to treat, prevent and diagnose diseases such as AIDS, herpes and malaria. Other partnerships included Thicon Inc. to develop a growth factor hormone for the treatment of wounds and Merck & Co to develop an improvement to their existing hepatitis B vaccine. In 1986, Professor Penhoet said: "Our business strategy is to dominate small markets rather than take a small presence in a broad market." The niche that Chiron was focusing on was ophthalmology, which Mr. Penhoet said was "big enough to be interesting, but small enough to service with 40 salespeople." Professor Penhoet also stated that Chiron was set up to provide the enabling technology for others to use under license, and later saying that Chiron was "as close to a virtual corporation as you can be", with few fixed assets but more relationships.

From 1982–1988, intense successive molecular biology studies at the Chiron Emeryville research labs had been undertaken for the treatment of hepatitis. In 1987, Rutter and his research team at Emeryville produced the first commercial genetically engineered vaccine against hepatitis B. Two years later, in 1989, Dr. Michael Houghton, Dr. Qui-Lim Choo, and Dr. George Kuo, in collaboration with Dr. Daniel W. Bradley at the CDC, finally identified the genome of the viral agent responsible for 80 to 90% of non-A and non-B post-transfusion hepatitis—the agent called hepatitis C virus. For this ground breaking discovery, Michael Houghton was one of the winners of the 2020 Nobel Prize in Medicine.

== Expansion ==
In 1988, Chiron formed a joint venture company, called Mimesys Inc., with Johnson & Johnson and the Warner-Lambert Company, to develop the next generation of biotech drugs. The following year Chiron recruited Gregory Lawless, who had come from DuPont, to take over as president and CEO. This led to additional buying that included the acquisition of Du Pont in partnership with Ortho Diagnostic Systems; Munich based Adatomed GmbH; and a merger with fellow biotech company Cetus Corporation after Cetus failed to get approval for its drug Interleukin-2. Hollings Renton of Cetus became president and CEO when Gregory Lawless agreed to leave. Mr Renton resigned in 1992 and was replaced by Sean Lance, from Glaxo Wellcome in 1998, and finally by Howard Pien from GlaxoSmithKline in 2003. After the acquisition of Cetus, Chiron split its operations among five entities: Cetus Oncology, for cancer drugs; the Biocine Company, for vaccines; Chiron Diagnostics, for blood screening and other diagnostic tests (later sold to Bayer AG for $1.1 billion); Chiron Intraoptics, for eye surgery, and Chiron Technologies, for research and development.

== Products and other acquisitions ==
In 1992, the company's first product, Proleukin, was approved in United States for the treatment of metastatic melanoma; previously it was only approved for use with kidney cancer. This was followed a year later by Betaseron, a beta interferon, the first treatment for relapsing-remitting multiple sclerosis and made by Berlex Laboratories Inc. In 1997 Chiron provided the active ingredient, becaplermin, in Regranex, a topical treatment for diabetic foot ulcers, manufactured by Ortho-McNeil Pharmaceutical Inc. In 2001, Chiron acquired PathoGenesis for its antibiotic drug Tobi, the first inhaled antibiotic approved for treating lung infections in cystic fibrosis patients. Having launched its first vaccine product, Fluad, an adjuvant influenza vaccine, in 1996, the vaccine line was expanded significantly in 1998 with the acquisition of the European vaccine businesses of Behring (Germany) and Sclavo (Italy). This was followed in 2003 by the acquisition of PowderJect, the UK-based vaccines company, making Chiron the second-largest flu vaccines provider and the fifth-largest vaccines business in the world. In 1998, Chiron's nucleic acid testing (NAT) blood-testing business was launched in cooperation with Gen-Probe, followed a year later by the launch of the Procleix system, which detects viral RNA and DNA in donated blood and plasma during the very early stages of infection, when those infectious agents are present but cannot be detected by immunodiagnostic tests. Chiron expanded its cancer drug portfolio in 2002 with the acquisition of Matrix Pharmaceuticals Inc and its product tezacitabine. Chiron also manufactured the MMR vaccine (measles mumps and rubella) at its Liverpool plant. Chiron in conjunction with Crucell (now part of Johnson & Johnson) developed a pentavalent vaccine called Quinvaxem targeting 5 diseases in children.

== Lawsuits ==
When in 1991 Cetus was acquired it was subject to a lawsuit by the Eastman Kodak Company over the rights to the polymerase chain reaction product, which was settled in 1993. In 1998, Chiron filed patent infringement suits in Europe, Japan and the US against Roche over its hepatitis C (HCV) products. Chiron was the first to clone HCV in 1989 after six years of research and had since filed over 100 HCV related patents in over 20 countries. A settlement was reached where Roche Holding A.G. agreed to buy the global semi-exclusive nucleic acid test (NAT) patents for HCV and HIV from Chiron. Bayer (the company that bought Chiron Diagnostics) sued Chiron Corporation in 2002 citing that it hid patent and equipment problems from them during purchase negotiations. The case filed in Delaware alleged breach of warranty, fraud, negligent misrepresentation, violation of the duty of good faith and fair dealing and breach of contract claims in connection with the acquisition.

In 2004, Chiron attracted adverse media coverage after the UK government suspended its license for manufacturing Fluvirin, an influenza vaccine, at its plant in Liverpool, England due to contamination concerns. This action left the United States government short of the vaccine. In August, it was announced that 4 million doses of the vaccine were potentially contaminated with Serratia marcescens. It later emerged that the Food and Drug Administration (FDA) may have been aware of the problem nine months earlier, but a miscommunication between the company and the FDA left the problem unsolved until the MHRA (Medicines and Healthcare Products Regulatory Agency), the British equivalent of the FDA stepped in and suspended Chiron's license. The company undertook a remediation program and succeeded in restoring the manufacturing license from MHRA in 2005. However, the incident resulted in a class action lawsuit for nearly $280m being brought against Chiron and its executives for allegedly, in 2003, overstating its ability to manufacture and ship the vaccine Fluvirin, thus allowing Novartis to buy Chiron shares below market value when the plant temporarily closed down. The amount settled in 2008 was for $30m.

== Bombings ==
On August 27 of 2003, two bombs exploded at Chiron's headquarters in Emeryville, California. A group calling itself Revolutionary Cells e-mailed a statement to reporters taking credit for the bombing and claimed that their action was due to Chiron's past contracts with Huntingdon Life Sciences, a contract research firm that conducts experiments on animals. The FBI has named Daniel Andreas San Diego as the lead suspect and placed him on its FBI Most Wanted Terrorists list.

== The end of Chiron ==
Novartis Corporation was the result of a merger between Sandoz Laboratories and Ciba-Geigy in 1996 and owned slightly less than half of Chiron as part of a Federal Trade Commission order. Several of Sandoz’s subsidiaries were sold off for reasons of anti monopoly legislation. In 2005, Novartis made an offer to buy Chiron. Initially this offer was rebuffed, but after the bid was substantially enhanced, Chiron was sold, and became part of Novartis in April, 2006. A year later, parts of ex-Chiron were sold in part and leased in part to Bayer. In 2011 Bayer announced it was withdrawing from a manufacturing plant it had leased from Novartis. and Novartis finally divested most of the former Chiron assets in 2013 as part of a global reorganization.

== Products ==
- Agrippal
- Begrivac
- Fluad
- Fluvirin
- Proleukin
- RabAvert/Rabipur
- TOBI

== See also ==
- Medicines and Healthcare products Regulatory Agency
- British Medical Association
- Food and Drug Administration
