= Ribonucleotide reductase inhibitor =

Drugs used in cancer treatment

Ribonucleotide reductase inhibitors are a family of anti-cancer drugs that interfere with the growth of tumor cells by blocking the formation of deoxyribonucleotides (building blocks of DNA).

Examples include:

- motexafin gadolinium.
- hydroxyurea
- fludarabine, cladribine, gemcitabine, tezacitabine, and triapine
- gallium maltolate, gallium nitrate
- Tezacitabine, Tezacitabine A chemotherapy candidate nucleotide analogue that failed in clinical trials due to on-target toxicity (febrile neutropenia).

== See also ==
- Ribonucleotide reductase
