= Daniel W. Bradley =

American virologist (born 1941)

- Born: July 13, 1941 (age 85)
- Education: San Jose State University; University of California; University of Arizona
- Known for: Hepatitis C
- Awards: Karl Landsteiner Memorial Award (1992); Robert Koch Prize (1993); William Beaumont Prize (1994); Gairdner Foundation International Award (2013)
- Scientific career
- Fields: Virology
- Workplaces: Centers for Disease Control and Prevention

Daniel W. Bradley (born July 13, 1941) is an American virologist who, along with Michael Houghton, Qui-Lim Choo and George Kuo at Chiron Corporation, worked to help isolate the hepatitis C virus in 1989.

== Career ==
Bradley graduated from San José State University in 1964, before going on to receive a master's degree in biochemistry from the University of California and a doctorate from the University of Arizona. He worked for the Centers for Disease Control and Prevention starting in 1971. He received the Karl Landsteiner Memorial Award of the American Association of Blood Banks in 1992, the Robert Koch Prize in 1993, and the Gairdner Foundation International Award in 2013.
