= William Beaumont Prize =

The William Beaumont Prize is a scientific award given by the American Gastroenterological Association (AGA) to scientists who have "made a major contribution (a single accomplishment or series of accomplishments) that has significantly advanced care of patients with digestive diseases through clinical or translational research". Recipients receive a $5,000 honorarium. The prize was initiated in 1976.

== Recipients ==
- 1976: R. A. Gregory, Viktor Mutt
- 1979: Bengt Borgstrom, Alan Hofmann
- 1982: Morton Grossman, Sir James Black
- 1985: George Sachs
- 1985: John G. Forte
- 1988: Saul Krugman, Mario Rizzetto, Jesse Summers
- 1991: Thomas Starzl
- 1994: Daniel W. Bradley, Michael Houghton, Qui-Lim Choo, George Kuo
- 1997: Bert Vogelstein
- 2000: Martin C. Carey, Donald Small
- 2006: Barry Marshall
- 2009: Warren Strober
- 2012: Richard Blumberg, Hans Clevers
- 2015: C. Richard Boland
- 2016: Anna Suk-Fong Lok
- 2017: David Ahlquist
- 2018: Mary K. Estes
- 2019: Timothy C. Wang
- 2020: Dennis Ahnen, Peter Kahrilas
- 2021: David Y. Graham
- 2022: Chung Owyang
- 2023: Anil Rustgi
- 2024: Hashem El-Serag
- 2025: Evan Dellon

== See also ==
- List of medicine awards
