= George William Gregory Bird =

British haematologist

- Born: 7 November 1916; Bombay, British India
- Died: 29 March 1997 (aged 80); Birmingham, England
- Occupation: Haematologist
- Years active: 1941–1997
- Known for: Blood transfusion, immunohaematology
- Spouse: Ruby
- Children: Three daughters
- Awards: Padma Shri; AFMC Hall of Fame; Karl Landsteiner Memorial Prize; Morten Grove Rasmussen Memorial Award; IMC Silver Jubilee Award

George William Gregory Bird (7 November 1916 – 29 March 1997) was a British medical doctor, academic, researcher and haematologist known for his expertise in the fields of blood transfusion and immunohaematology. He founded the Department of Transfusion Medicine at the Armed Forces Medical College, Pune and was inducted into their Hall of Fame in 2010. A winner of the Karl Landsteiner Memorial Prize and Morten Grove Rasmussen Memorial Award of the American Association of Blood Banks, Gregory Bird was honoured by the Government of India in 1963, with the award of Padma Shri, the fourth highest Indian civilian award for his services to the nation.

== Biography ==
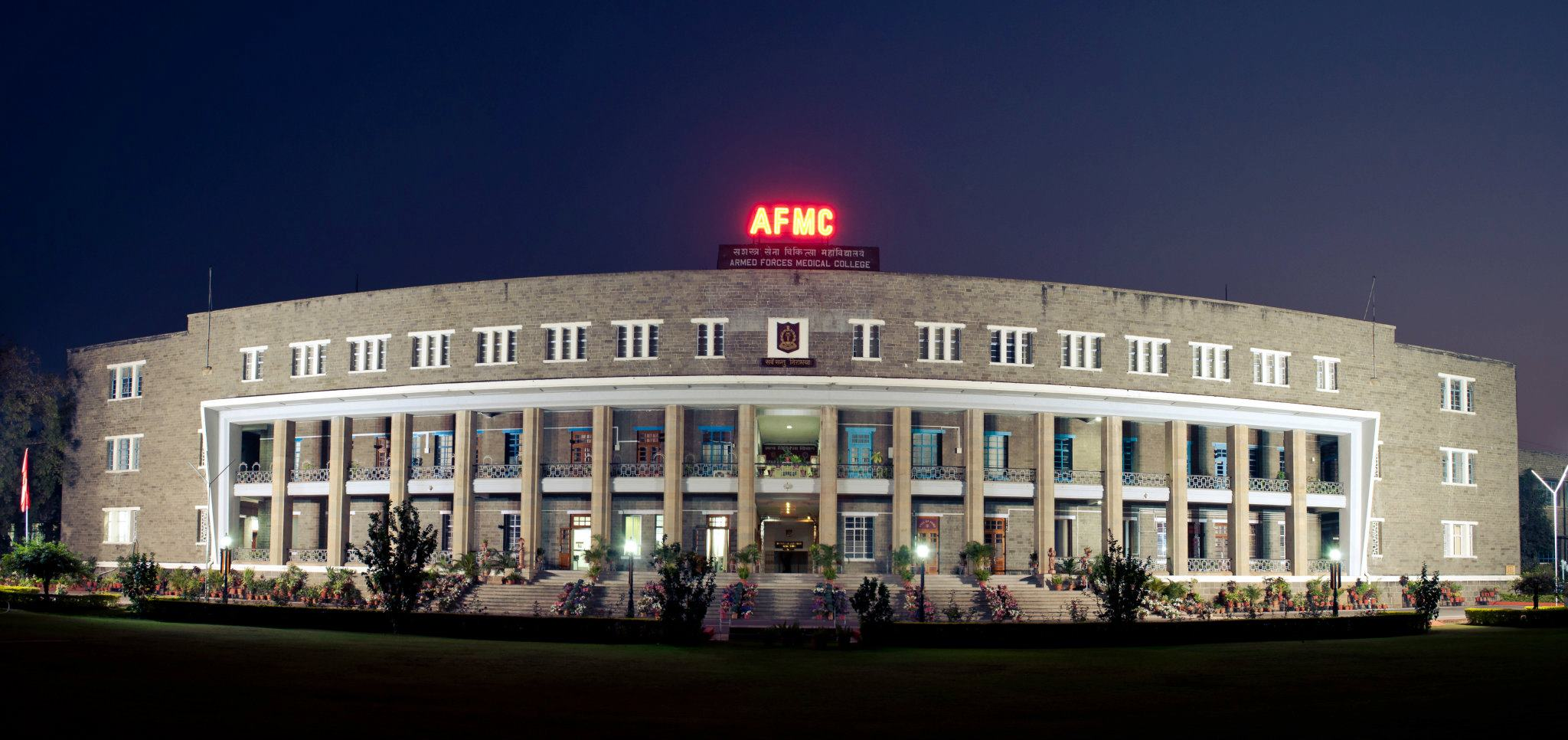
AFMC Main Building

George William Gregory Bird, born in the UK in 1916, graduated in medicine in 1941. After joining the medical corps of the British Army, he served in the Middle East and India in the British Base Transfusion Units and trained army doctors on trauma management. During his posting in India, he established the department of Transfusion Medicine in India in 1948, as the head of the Department at the Armed Forces Medical College, Pune. He worked at AFMC till 1966 during which time his researches on Dolichos biflorus (horse gram) revealed the agglutinating activity of human A1 red cells in its extracts. He continued his researches on seeds and was credited with the discovery of anti-T in Arachis hypogea (peanut). His prolific work in this area is reported to have earned him the moniker, The King of Lectins and Polyagglutination. In 1961, when Queen Elizabeth II visited India, Gregory Bird was in charge of medical arrangements for the dignitary and also attended to Dr. Rajendra Prasad, the first Indian president, on his terminal medical condition. During this period, he continued his studies and secured FRCPath from the Royal College of Pathologists and a doctoral degree from London.

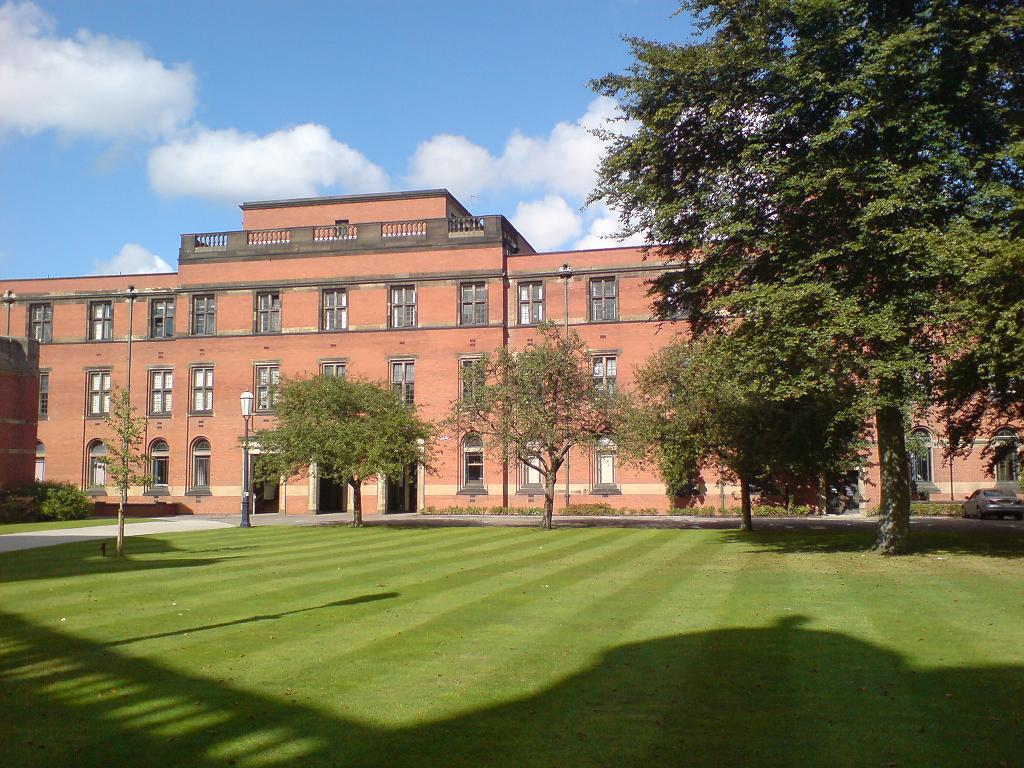
University of Birmingham-Chancellor's Court

Bird returned to England in 1966, accepting the post of a consultant pathologist and director of the Regional Blood Transfusion Service, Birmingham where he worked till his retirement in 1981. Post retirement as a lieutenant colonel, he was appointed as the Honorary Consultant to the West Midlands Regional Health Authority and simultaneously worked as a senior research fellow in Clinical Genetics at the University of Birmingham. The next year, he became the Consultant Advisor to the International Blood Group References Laboratory (IBGRL) of Oxford University and became its director in 1986, simultaneously holding the post of the Honorary Senior Clinical Lecturer, Department of Immunology, University of Birmingham. In 1987, he stepped down from the post at IBGRL but continued there as an honorary consultant. He was the president of the British Blood Transfusion Society during 1985-87 and was the president of the Oliver Memorial Fund for Blood Transfusion in 1986. He was also a Regional Counselor for the Western European Division for International Society for Blood Transfusion from 1980 to 1984 and a member of the Haematology Expert Group of the Indian Council of Medical Research.

The research spectrum of Bird centered around blood groups and their anthropological, biochemical, clinical, genetic, immunohaematological and oncological aspects. His main focus was on human red blood cells, haemoglobin variants, blood groups, malignancies, red blood cell cryptantigens and polyagglutinability. His researches were published by way of over 200 medical papers and as reference manuals and chapters in many text books. A prolific speaker on haematology, he was also active in medical administration and was credited with automation and computerization of blood transfusion services during his career.

Bird was married to Ruby and the couple had three daughters, Ann, Margaret and Dorothy. He died on 29 March 1997, at the age of 81, succumbing to complications following a renal failure.

== Awards and honours ==
Bird was a part of several committees and medical societies during his career. A member of the ICMR Expert Group on Haematology, he was also a member of the Advisory Committee of the National Blood Transfusion Services of UK Department of Health and Social Security. The Council of Europe Select Committee of Experts on Automation and Quality Control in Blood Transfusion Laboratories, the Working Party on the Terminology for Red Cell Surface Antigens and Working Party on the socioeconomic aspects of Blood Transfusion, both of the International Society of Blood Transfusion (ISBT) were some of the other committees he served.

The Government of India honoured Bird in 1963 with the civilian award of Padma Shri. The next year, the Indian Medical Council awarded him the Silver Jubilee Honour and Gold Medal. He received two honours from the American Association of Blood Banks (AABB), Morten Grove Rasmussen Memorial award in 1980 and Karl Landsteiner Memorial Prize in 1989. In between, he received the Oliver Memorial Award in 1981. The Armed Forces Medical College, Pune inducted him into their Hall of Fame in 2010.

== See also ==
- Armed Forces Medical College, Pune
- Immunohaematology
- American Association of Blood Banks
- Lectin
