= Mario Rizzetto =

Italian virologist (born 1945)

- Born: 4 June 1945 (age 81)
- Education: University of Padua
- Known for: Hepatitis D
- Awards: King Faisal International Prize (1985); Robert Koch Prize (1987); William Beaumont Prize (1988); Hans Popper Award (1992)
- Scientific career
- Fields: Virology

Mario Rizzetto (born 4 June 1945) is an Italian virologist who in 1977 first reported the Hepatitis D virus as a nuclear antigen in patients infected with HBV who had severe liver disease.

He graduated in Medicine and Surgery at the University of Padua in 1969. He was awarded the King Faisal International Prize in Medicine in 1985, the Robert Koch Prize in 1987, the William Beaumont Prize of the American Gastroenterological Association in 1988, and the Hans Popper Award in 1992.
