= George Kuo =

Taiwanese biochemist

Kuo Ching-Hung
- 郭勁宏
- Education: National Taiwan University (MD); Yeshiva University (PhD)
- Known for: Hepatitis C
- Awards: Karl Landsteiner Memorial Award (1992); William Beaumont Prize (1994); Dale A. Smith Memorial Award (2005)
- Scientific career
- Fields: Virology
- Workplaces: Chiron Corporation
- Thesis: The In Vitro Replication of Bacteriophage Q-Beta RNA (1972)

Kuo Ching-Hung (Chinese: 郭勁宏), also known by his English name George Kuo, is a Taiwanese biochemist who, along with Michael Houghton, Qui-Lim Choo and Daniel W. Bradley, co-discovered and cloned the hepatitis C virus in 1989.

Following the discovery of Hepatitis C at Chiron Corporation, Kuo, who was working in a lab next door to Michael Houghton's, designed a test that could screen blood for the infection, and in 1988 Japanese Emperor Hirohito was the first person to receive blood that had been screened by Kuo's method. The United States would go on to license the testing technique in 1990. The development of diagnostic reagents to detect HCV in blood supplies has reduced the risk of acquiring HCV through blood transfusion from one in three to about one in two million.

He was awarded the Karl Landsteiner Memorial Award (1992) and Dale A. Smith Memorial Award (2005) of the American Association of Blood Banks, and the William Beaumont Prize of the American Gastroenterological Association in 1994.

== Education ==
Kuo graduated from National Taiwan University with a Doctor of Medicine (M.D.) in 1961, then completed doctoral studies in the United States at Yeshiva University, where he earned his Ph.D. in biochemistry from the Albert Einstein College of Medicine in 1972. His doctoral dissertation was titled, "The In Vitro Replication of Bacteriophage Q-Beta RNA."

== Personal life ==
His wife is Carol Lan-Fang Kuo, who also worked for the Chiron Corporation in Emeryville, California. Together they worked on developing vaccines and blood-testing procedures for hepatitis C. They have a daughter, Irene Carol, a graduate of the Massachusetts Institute of Technology and the University of California, San Francisco, an associate professor of ophthalmology at Johns Hopkins School of Medicine in Baltimore, and a specialist in cornea and refractive surgery at the Wilmer Eye Institute.
