= John Haighton =

British doctor (c.1755–1823)

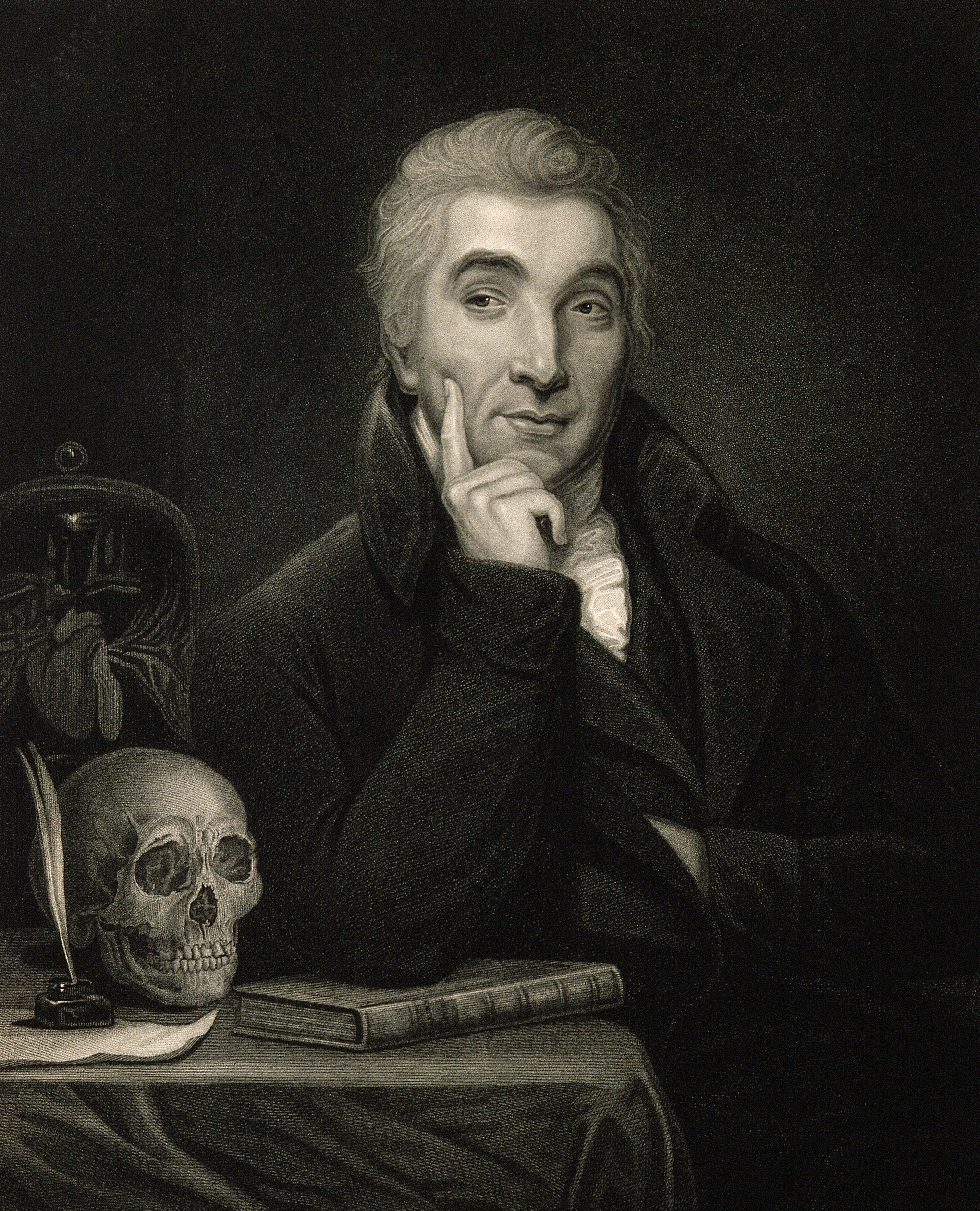
John Haighton

John Haighton FRS (c. 1755 – 23 March 1823), was an English physician and physiologist.

== Biography ==
Haighton was born in Lancashire about 1755, and, after being a pupil of Mr. Else at St Thomas' Hospital, became a surgeon to the Guards regiments, but resigned on being appointed demonstrator of anatomy at St. Thomas' under Henry Cline. He had already become a skilful surgeon and was so promising an anatomist that the famous surgeon John Hunter had almost concluded an agreement for him to assist him in his lectures. Haighton, however, was not so agreeable and accessible to students as his junior, Astley Paston Cooper, whose developing talent and influence hindered Haighton's advancement. Consequently, Haighton resigned his demonstratorship in 1789 and turned his attention to physiology (in which he succeeded a Dr. Skeete as lecturer in 1788 or 1789) and to midwifery, in which he at first lectured in conjunction with a Dr. Lowder. Both these courses were for the united hospitals, St. Thomas's and Guy's. He never succeeded to a physiciancy, though he obtained the degree of M.D. (in 1794 at Kings College, Aberdeen).

He was somewhat suspicious, irritable, and argumentative, but a good lecturer on physiology and an excellent obstetric operator. For his physiological experiments, which were certainly ruthless and numerous, he was called by his opponents "the Merciless Doctor". When Sir Astley Cooper disputed the result of some of Haighton's experiments, the latter killed a favourite spaniel, on which he had previously operated, in order to prove Sir Astley in the wrong. He often presided at the meetings of the Physical Society at Guy's Hospital, was joint editor of Medical Records and Researches (T. Cox, 1798), and assisted Dr. William Saunders (1743–1817) in his Treatise on the Liver (1793). The silver medal of the Medical Society of London for 1790 was adjudged to him for his paper on Deafness.

In later years he suffered much from asthma, and his nephew. Dr. James Blundell, began to assist him in his lectures in 1814, and took the entire course from 1818. In 1810, Haighton was elected as a member of the American Philosophical Society in Philadelphia. He was also elected a Fellow of the Royal Society in 1815.

He died on 23 March 1823. Blundell describes him as kind-hearted, generous, and scrupulously truthful, and a cautious and able physician. Dr. Blundell's nephew, Dr. G. A. Wilks of Torquay, has a good portrait of Haighton.

== Publications ==
- The History of Two Cases of Fractured Olecranon, in "Medical Commentaries" (vol. ix.), 1785.
- An Attempt to Ascertain the Powers concerned in the Act of Vomiting, in "Memoirs of the Medical Society of London" (ii. 250), 1789.
- Two Experiments on the Mechanism of Vomiting (ib. p. 512).
- A Case of Original Deafness (ib. iii. 1), 1792.
- Experiments made on the Laryngeal and Recurrent Branches of the Eighth Pair of Nerves (ib. p. 422).
- An Experimental Inquiry concerning the Reproduction of Nerves, in "Philosophical Transactions", 1795, and "Medical Facts and Observations", vol. vii. His method in this paper is to test the repair of nerves by the recovery of their physiological function after division; the first paper of the kind.
- An Experimental Inquiry concerning Animal Impregnation, in "Philosophical Transactions", 1797. In this paper he relates many experiments on rabbits, most skilfully varied, but producing an unsound conclusion owing to the lack of microscopic knowledge at that time.
- A Case of Tic Douloureux, in "Medical Records", 1798 (p. 19).
- An Inquiry concerning the True and Spurious Cæsarian Operation. (ib. p. 242).

He also published extended syllabuses of his courses of lectures at various dates. The manuscript of his lectures on physiology and natural philosophy, 1796, is in the library of the Medico-Chirurgical Society.
