= Scott Murphy (physician) =

Scott Murphy (1936 – 13 April 2006) was an American hematologist, medical researcher, and professor of medicine.

After secondary education at Episcopal Academy, he attended Yale University, graduating in 1958. He received his M.D. in 1962 from Columbia University College of Physicians and Surgeons. He was a medical intern from 1962 to 1963 at Boston's Peter Bent Brigham Hospital. From 1963 to 1965 Murphy was a U.S. Army captain stationed at San Francisco's Letterman Army Hospital. Discharged from the Army in 1965, he completed his medical residency at Peter Bent Brigham Hospital and then in 1966 became a research fellow in hematology at Presbyterian–University of Pennsylvania Medical Center.

He joined the faculty of Penn's School of Medicine, becoming an associate professor of medicine in 1975, the same year that he was appointed the director of the division of hematology-oncology and the director of the hematology research laboratory. There he began the research into blood platelets and methods for improving their storage that became the focus of his professional career.

In 1969 Murphy and Frank H. Gardner (1919–2013) demonstrated that room temperature of blood platelets is less deleterious than their refrigerated storage. Murphy and his colleagues developed and improved methods for collection, processing, and storage of blood platelets, thereby making blood transfusions safer and more efficacious.

In 1976 he left the University of Pennsylvania's School of Medicine. From 1976 to 1993 he was a member of Center City, Philadelphia's Cardeza Foundation for Hematology Research at Thomas Jefferson University. In 1993 he relocated upon being appointed the associate medical director of the Penn-Jersey Region, American Red Cross (Philadelphia). There he was appointed chief medical officer in 1994, retaining that post until his death in 2006 from malignant lymphoma.

Murphy returned to the University of Pennsylvania's School of Medicine as an adjunct professor of medicine in 1999. Upon his death he was survived by his widow, a daughter, four sons, and ten grandchildren.

== Awards and honors ==
- 1998 — Karl Landsteiner Memorial Award, American Association of Blood Banks
- 2005 — Charles R. Drew Award, American Red Cross

== Selected publications ==
- with Frank H. Gardner: Murphy, S.; Gardner, F. H. (15 May 1969). "Platelet Preservation — Effect of Storage Temperature on Maintenance of Platelet Viability — Deleterious Effect of Refrigerated Storage". N Engl J Med. 280 (20): 1094–1098. doi:10.1056/nejm196905152802004. PMID 5778424.
- with Frank A. Oski, J. Lawrence Naiman, Charles J. Lusch, Sheldon Goldberg, and Frank H. Gardner: Murphy, Scott; Oski, Frank A.; Naiman, J. Lawrence; Lusch, Charles J.; Goldberg, Sheldon; Gardner, Frank H. (9 March 1972). "Platelet Size and Kinetics in Hereditary and Acquired Thrombocytopenia". N Engl J Med. 286 (10): 499–504. doi:10.1056/nejm197203092861001. PMID 5062078. (See thrombocytopenia.)
- with Marie J. Stuart, Frank A. Oski, Audrey E. Evans, Milton H. Donaldson, and Frank H. Gardner: Stuart, Marie J.; Murphy, Scott; Oski, Frank A.; Evans, Audrey E.; Donaldson, Milton H.; Gardner, Frank H. (30 November 1972). "Platelet Function in Recipients of Platelets from Donors Ingesting Aspirin". N Engl J Med. 287 (22): 1105–1109. doi:10.1056/nejm197211302872201. PMID 5082189.
- with Marie J. Stuart and Frank A. Oski: Stuart, Marie J.; Murphy, Scott; Oski, Frank A. (19 June 1975). "A Simple Nonradioisotope Technic for the Determination of Platelet Life-Span". N Engl J Med. 292 (25): 1310–1313. doi:10.1056/nejm197506192922502.
- with John W. Adamson, Philip J. Fialkow, Jaroslav F. Prchal, and Laura Steinmann: Adamson, John W.; Fialkow, Philip J.; Murphy, Scott; Prchal, Jaroslav F.; Steinmann, Laura (21 October 1976). "Polycythemia Vera: Stem-Cell and Probable Clonal Origin of the Disease". N Engl J Med. 295 (17): 913–916. doi:10.1056/nejm197610212951702. PMID 967201. (See polycythemia vera.)
