= Mary K. Estes =

American virologist

Mary K. Estes is an American virologist who is professor at Baylor College of Medicine in Houston, Texas. Her courses include microbiology, and virology; she is also the co-director of the Translational Biology and Molecular Medicine Graduate Program at Baylor College of Medicine. There are two main viruses that her research is based on, rotaviruses and noroviruses. The main goal of her research are to study how the viral proteins interact with the receptors of the intestinal cells; they are also looking into different ways to deliver virus-like particles to prevent these viruses from causing infections. Estes has achieved many awards and recognition in her time as a virologist. She is also a member of multiple foundations and professional societies.

== Contributions to virology ==
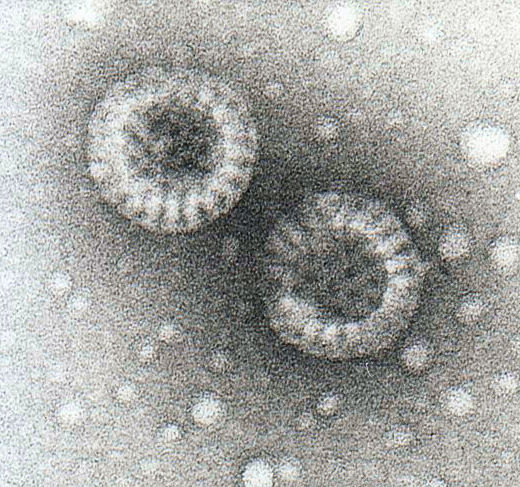
Description: Electron micrograph of two rotavirus particles that have been negatively stained with potassium phosphotungstate

Estes has studied rotaviruses and noroviruses. Although rotaviruses can infect animals, the research Estes performs concerns its effects on children. In the 2009 article Rotaviruses: from pathogenesis to vaccination Estes explains the life-threatening side effects of rotavirus infection and the vaccinations that are now being used as a preventative measure. Efforts, by others to develop a successful vaccine against the virus started in the 1980s. Two vaccines were eventually developed —RotaTeq and Rotarix; however, there has been some concern about their safety due to a small increased risk of intussusception. Estes' research group is credited with discovering a novel enterotoxin involved in rotavirus pathology, as well as the effect of histoblood group antigens on an individual's susceptibility to norowalk virus infection. Estes's laboratory continues to research the molecular mechanisms involved in the pathology of gastrointestinal viruses using recombinant virus-like particles to probe their structure and function. She is also, through collaboration, working on vaccine development for the noroviruses that she studies. Her research group was the first to succeed at growing noroviruses in human intestinal cell cultures.

== Awards and recognition ==
A full list of awards is available for viewing on the Baylor College of Medicine faculty page of Mary K. Estes. She has been elected a fellow to both the National Academy of Sciences and the American Association for the Advancement of Science.

Recent awards include:

- American Association for the Advancement of Science, "Fellow" (01/2000)
- Researcher/Investigator of the Year, Crohn's & Colitis Foundation Gold Key Award, "Receiver" (01/2000)
- Institute of Medicine, National Academy of Science, "Member (01/2005)
- Academy of Medicine, Engineering, and Science of Texas, "Member" (01/2005)
- Cullen Foundation, "Chair of Human and Molecular Virology" (2006)
- National Academy of Sciences, Member (2007)
- AGA Distinguished Achievement Award, Receiver (2010)
- William Beaumont Prize (2018)
