= Qui-Lim Choo =

Virologist

- Born: Singapore
- Education: Queen Elizabeth College; King's College London (PhD)
- Known for: Hepatitis C Hepatitis D
- Awards: Karl Landsteiner Memorial Award (1992); William Beaumont Prize (1994); Dale A. Smith Memorial Award (2005)
- Scientific career
- Fields: Virology
- Workplaces: Chiron Corporation
- Thesis: Neuronal proteins examined by a two-dimensional gel system (1980)

Qui-Lim Choo (Chinese: 朱桂林) is a Singapore-born scientist, who along with Michael Houghton, George Kuo and Daniel W. Bradley, co-discovered and cloned hepatitis C in 1989. He also co-discovered the hepatitis D genome in 1986. The discovery of hepatitis C led to the rapid development of diagnostic reagents to detect hepatitis C virus in blood supplies which has reduced the risk of acquiring hepatitis C through blood transfusion from one in three to about one in two million. It is estimated that antibody testing has prevented at least 40,000 new infections per year in the US alone and many more worldwide.

== Early life and education ==
Choo received his undergraduate training at Queen Elizabeth College in 1973 and completed his PhD in biochemistry at King's College London in 1980. He trained under William J. Rutter at the University of California, San Francisco before joining Chiron Corporation.

== Awards and recognition ==
He was awarded the Karl Landsteiner Memorial Award (1992) and Dale A. Smith Memorial Award (2005) of the American Association of Blood Banks, and the William Beaumont Prize of the American Gastroenterological Association in 1994.
