= Centre for Blood Research =

Canadian research institute

- Established: 2002
- Research type: Biomedical
- Director: Dana V. Devine
- Website: www.cbr.ubc.ca

The Centre for Blood Research (CBR) is a multidisciplinary biomedical research institute, situated primarily at the University of British Columbia (UBC) and affiliated teaching hospitals in Vancouver, British Columbia, Canada, with nodes at the University of Northern British Columbia and at the University of Victoria. Its mission is to improve the health and well-being of patients by performing innovative research in blood and blood-related processes.

The CBR is home to more than 40 research groups that employ a broad range of basic science, biotechnological, engineering and clinical investigative methods to address blood and blood-related science and health-related questions. CBR research groups are led by chemists, biologists, biochemists, pathologists, immunologists, geneticists, engineers, psychologists, sociologists, dentists, pediatricians, hematologists, oncologists, virologists and microbiologists, who are based in the Faculties of Medicine, Applied Science and Engineering, Arts, Sociology, Dentistry, Pharmaceutical Science and Science.

== History ==
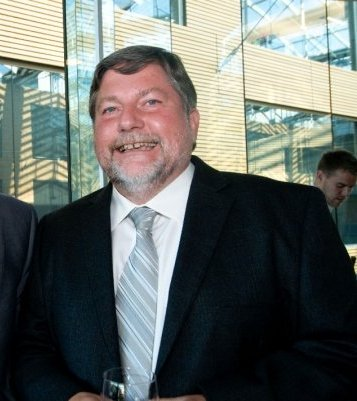
Dr. Ross MacGillivray, founding Director of the CBR

The reason for creating a multidisciplinary research institute with a focus on blood emanated from a Royal Commission of Inquiry on the Blood System in Canada in the 1980s when HIV and hepatitis entered the Canadian blood supply. Among many recommendations, Judge Krever called for a renewed emphasis on research excellence in the broad area of blood and blood transfusion. In 2002, a group of professors from the University of British Columbia (UBC) led by the founding director of the CBR, Dr. Ross MacGillivray, gathered a team of scientists, engineers, social scientists and clinicians with expertise in a range of disciplines who could in combination address blood-related issues and health problems more effectively than they could individually.

Financial support for CBR research infrastructure and training and education programs was provided by the Universities of British Columbia, Victoria and Northern British Columbia, the Canadian Blood Services (CBS), the Michael Smith Foundation for Health Research, the Heart and Stroke Foundation of Canada, the Province of British Columbia, the Canadian Institutes of Health Research (CIHR), the Canada Foundation for Innovation (CFI), and several industrial partners.

== Major areas of research ==
A major hub of the CBR is located at the Life Sciences Centre at UBC

- The development of safe blood products and blood substitutes
- The design and validation of approaches to prevent excess bleeding and excess blood clotting
- The research of the role of iron and other metals in the blood in health and disease
- The development of techniques to fight difficult-to-treat infections
- The discovery of blood biomarkers that will be useful in early detection of disease and/or risk of relapse
- The research of multicultural issues that impact on response to health care delivery and blood-related disease.

== Education and outreach ==
The CBR attempts to promote public awareness of the potential value of blood-related research for improving patient health. Training and education programs have been established at the CBR for scientists and clinicians interested in pursuing careers in the field of blood and blood-related processes.
