= Transfusion (journal) =

Medical journal

- Discipline: Transfusion medicine
- Language: English
- Edited by: Richard Kaufman

Publication details
- History: 1960–present
- Publisher: Wiley on behalf of the Association for the Advancement of Blood and Biotherapies
- Frequency: Monthly
- Impact factor: 3.337 (2021)

Standard abbreviations
- ISO 4: Transfusion

Indexing
- CODEN: TRANAT
- ISSN: 0041-1132 (print); 1537-2995 (web)
- LCCN: 64005953
- OCLC no.: 01604474

Links
- Journal homepage; Online access; Online archive

Transfusion is a monthly peer-reviewed medical journal covering transfusion medicine that is published by Wiley on behalf of the Association for the Advancement of Blood and Biotherapies. According to the Journal Citation Reports, it had a 2021 impact factor of 3.337. The journal was established in 1960 with Tibor J. Greenwalt as its founding editor-in-chief. As of 2021, the editor-in-chief is Richard Kaufman.

The journal is abstracted and indexed in Scopus, Index Medicus/MEDLINE/PubMed, EMBASE, CINAHL, BIOSIS Previews, CAB Abstracts, Current Contents/Clinical Medicine and Life Sciences, Biological Abstracts, and the Science Citation Index Expanded.
