= Gordon Bell High School =

Coordinates: 49.8868°N 97.1617°W

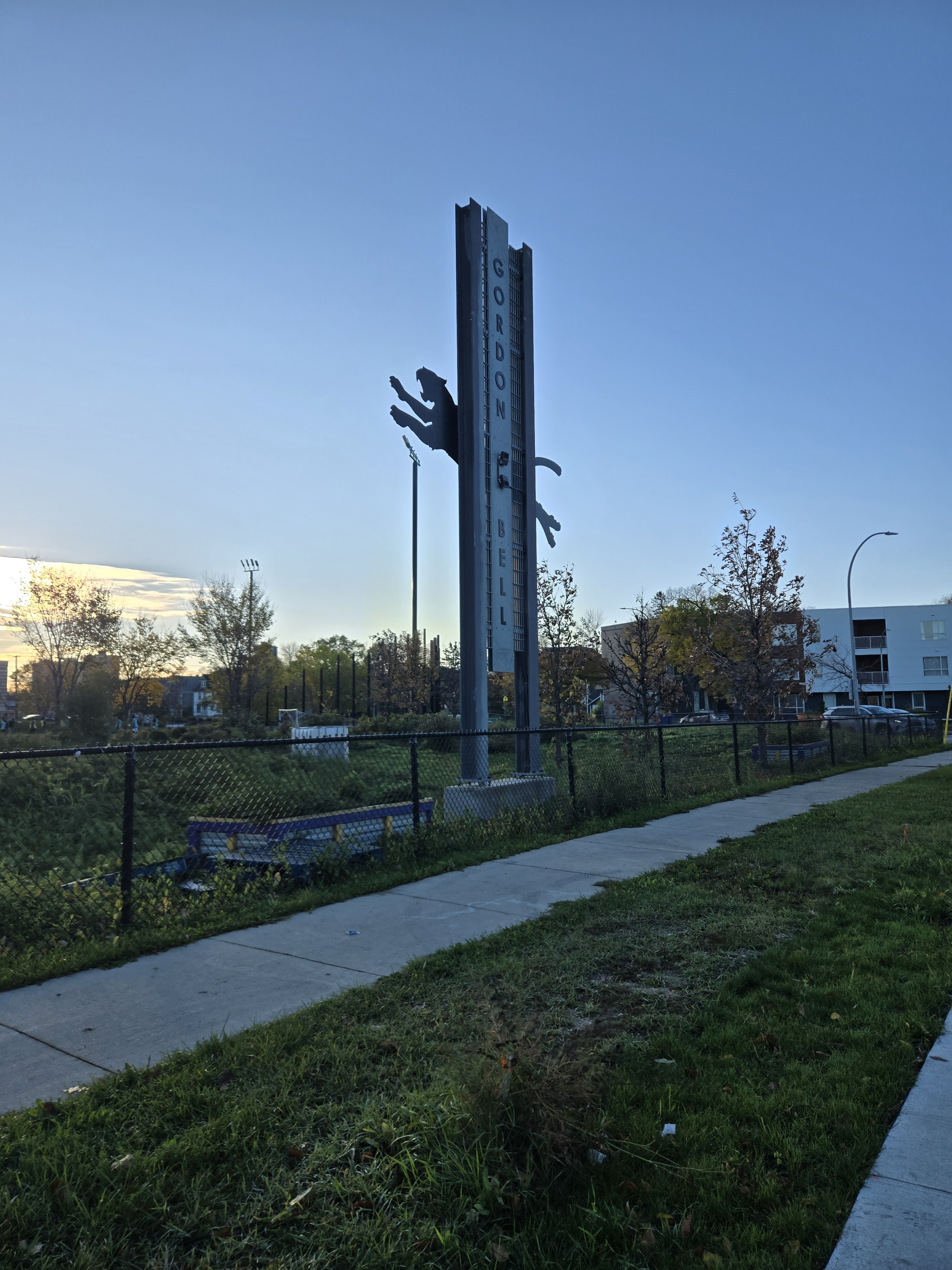
- The Gordon Bell signage at Portage and Broadway

Location
- 3 Borrowman Place; Winnipeg, Manitoba, R3G 1M6; Canada

Information
- Type: Public junior and senior high school
- Motto: To strive, to seek, to find, and not to yield.
- Established: c. 1926
- School district: Winnipeg School Division
- Superintendent: Matt Henderson
- Area trustee: Rebecca Chambers
- Principal: Tanis Westdal
- Vice-Principal (7-9): Julie Popke
- Vice-Principal (10-12): Nicole Frykas
- Grades: 7–12
- Age range: 11-18
- Enrollment: 742 (2025-2026)
- Average class size: 15-30 students
- Hours in school day: 6 hours 30 mins (1 hour lunch break)
- Area: Downtown and Wolesley
- Campus type: Urban
- Student Council: Gordon Bell Student Council
- Colors: Purple and Gold
- Athletics: Soccer; Volleyball; Basketball; Golf; Track and field; Curling; Flag football
- Athletics conference: MHSAA
- Nickname: Panthers
- Team name: Gordon Bell Panthers
- Feeder schools: Greenway; Wolesley; Mulvey; General Wolfe; River Heights; École Sacré-Coeur; Gladstone; École Victoria-Albert
- Graduates (2025): 90
- Website: www.winnipegsd.ca/gordonbell
- Last updated: June 15, 2026

Gordon Bell High School is a public junior and senior high school in Winnipeg, Manitoba, Canada. It is located in the inner city of Winnipeg. The school is bordered by the Trans-Canada Highway on Broadway to the south, Portage Avenue to the north, and Maryland Street to the east, which then Portage Avenue and Broadway connect to the west.

== History ==
Gordon Bell School was founded in 1926 at Maryland Street and Wolseley Avenue as a junior high school, and became a senior high school in 1932. It was named after Gordon Bell, a physician and educator. The current school was built in 1956 a few blocks to the north of the original building, on what were the grounds of Mulvey School No. 3.

Gordon Bell is undergoing renovations, but still operates as normal. The project was originally projected to finish by January 2025, but is now projected to finish in June 2025.

== Athletics ==
Some of the sports Gordon Bell participates in are:

- Volleyball
- Basketball
- Golf
- Track and field
- Soccer
- Curling (Varsity only, WSD Finalists, 2024–25)
- Flag football (Varsity girls only)

== Off-campus programs ==
In 1982, an Winnipeg School Division Grade 9-12 program (hosted by Rossbrook House) named Rising Sun was founded. It is located at 429 Elgin Avenue, and operates as an off-campus program of Gordon Bell High.

== Notable alumni ==
- Adam Beach, actor
- Jack Bowman, physician, medical researcher, and professor of medicine
- Andy Frost, disc jockey
- Marion Lewis, medical researcher and professor of medicine
- Sierra Noble, singer
- Murray Peden, lawyer
- Carl Ridd, professional basketball player
