= Harvey J. Alter =

American medical researcher

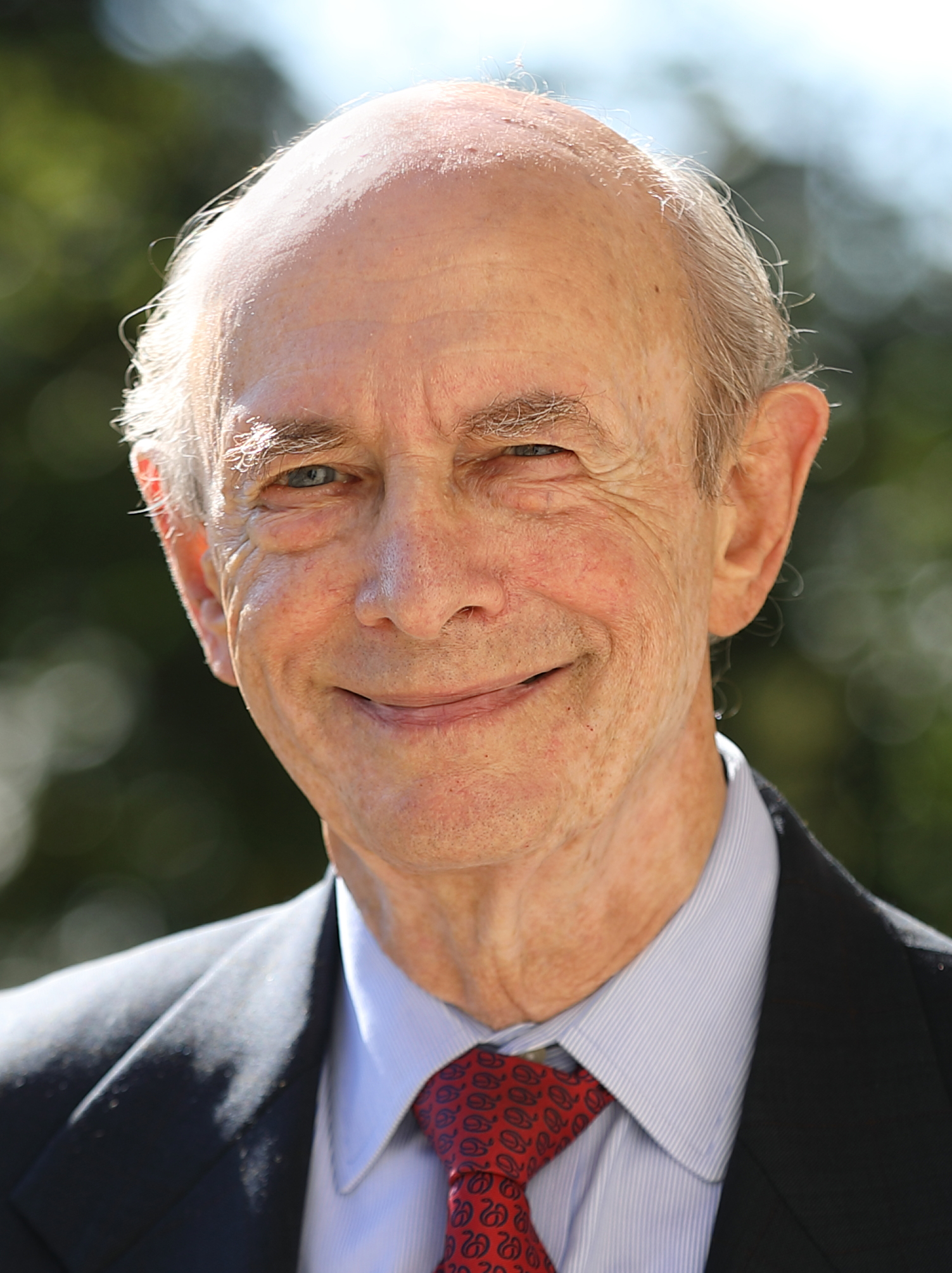
- Alter in 2020
- Born: Harvey James Alter; September 12, 1935 (age 89); New York City, New York, U.S.
- Education: University of Rochester (BA, MD)
- Known for: Hepatitis C
- Awards: Karl Landsteiner Memorial Award (1992); Lasker Award (2000); Gairdner Foundation International Award (2013); Nobel Prize for Medicine (2020)
- Scientific career
- Fields: Virology

Harvey James Alter (born September 12, 1935) is an American medical researcher, virologist, physician and Nobel Prize laureate, who is best known for his work that led to the discovery of the hepatitis C virus. Alter is the former chief of the infectious disease section and the associate director for research of the Department of Transfusion Medicine at the Warren Grant Magnuson Clinical Center in the National Institutes of Health (NIH) in Bethesda, Maryland. In the mid-1970s, Alter and his research team demonstrated that most post-transfusion hepatitis cases were not due to hepatitis A or hepatitis B viruses. Working independently, Alter and Edward Tabor, a scientist at the U.S. Food and Drug Administration, proved through transmission studies in chimpanzees that a new form of hepatitis, initially called "non-A, non-B hepatitis" caused the infections, and that the causative agent was probably a virus. This work eventually led to the discovery of the hepatitis C virus in 1988, for which he shared the Nobel Prize in Physiology or Medicine in 2020 along with Michael Houghton and Charles M. Rice.

Alter has received recognition for the research leading to the discovery of the virus that causes hepatitis C. He was awarded the Distinguished Service Medal, the highest award conferred to civilians in United States government public health service, and the 2000 Albert Lasker Award for Clinical Medical Research.

== Early life and education ==
Alter was born in New York City in a Jewish family. He attended the University of Rochester in Rochester, New York, and earned a Bachelor of Arts degree in 1956. In 1960, Alter obtained a medical degree from University of Rochester and began a residency at Strong Memorial. Alter's post-graduate training includes a rotation as a clinical associate at the National Institutes of Health in Bethesda, Maryland, from December 1961 to June 1964; a year of residency in medicine at University of Washington School of Medicine, Seattle, Washington, from July 1964 to June 1965; and work as a hematology fellow at Georgetown University Hospital, Washington, D.C., from July 1965 to June 1966.

== Career ==
Alter has a medical license issued by the District of Columbia. Additionally he holds certification by the American Board of Pathology blood banking subspecialty and is a fellow of the American College of Physicians. Clinical appointments include: director, hematology research at Georgetown University Hospital from July 1966 to June 1969; senior investigator in the Department of Transfusion Medicine at the NIH from July 1969 to present; chief of infectious diseases section at the department of transfusion medicine in the Clinical Center NIH from December 1972 to present; associate director for research at the department of transfusion medicine at the Clinical Center at NIH from January 1987 to present.

Alter's academic appointments include: clinical associate professor of medicine at Georgetown University Hospital; adjunct professor at Southwest Foundation for Biomedical Research in San Antonio, TX; clinical professor of medicine at Georgetown University Hospital; and a faculty position at Clinical Research Training Program at the NIH.

Alter came to the NIH Clinical Center as a senior investigator in 1969. He remains at the NIH as a chief of the infectious diseases section and associate director of research in the department of transfusion medicine.

== Medical research ==
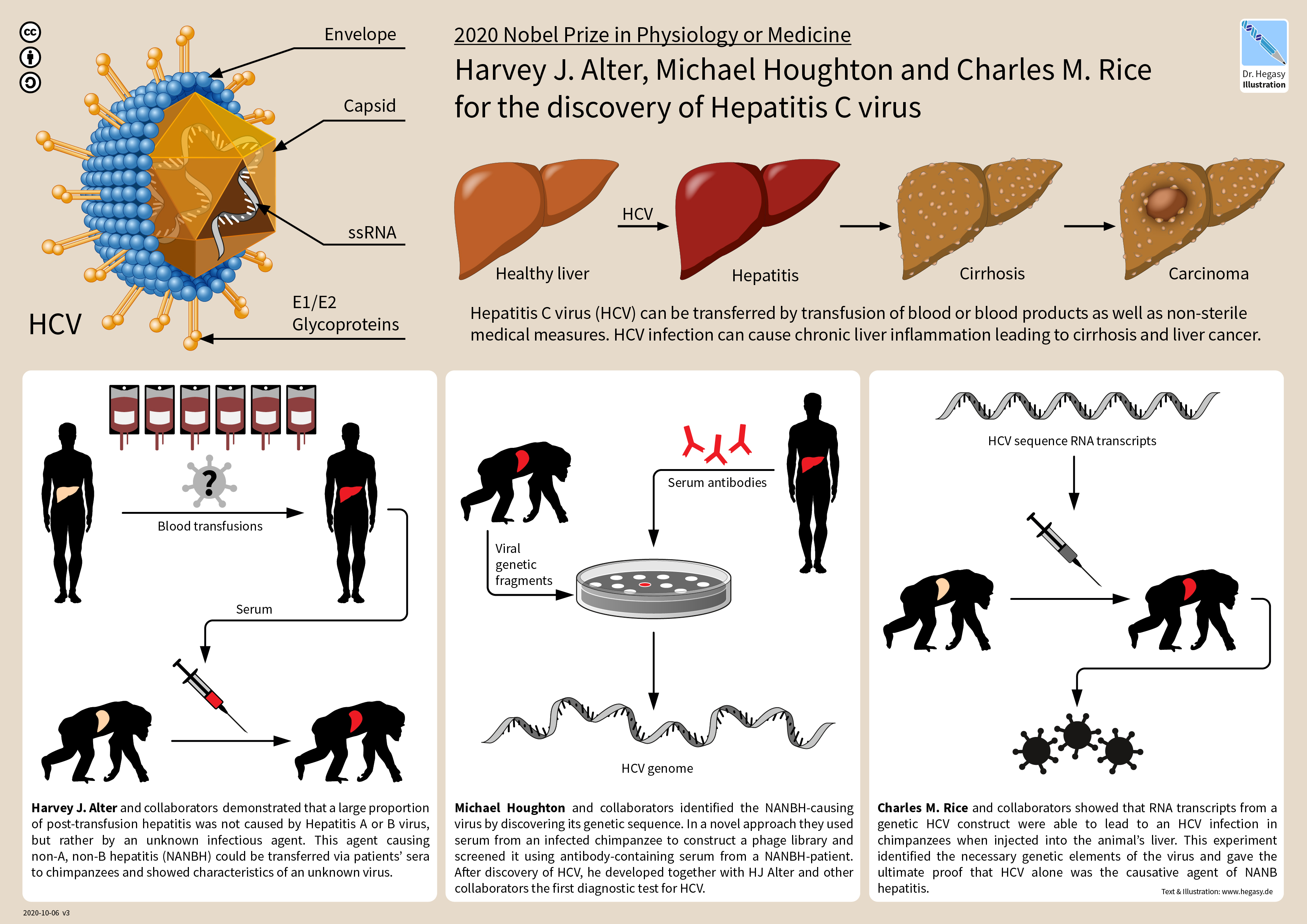
Nobel Prize in Physiology or Medicine 2020: Seminal experiments by HJ Alter, M Houghton and CM Rice leading to the discovery of HCV as the causative agent of non-A, non-B hepatitis.

As a young research fellow in 1964, Alter co-discovered the Australia antigen with Baruch Blumberg. This work was a major factor in isolating the hepatitis B virus. Later, Alter led a Clinical Center project to store blood samples used to uncover the causes and reduce the risk of transfusion-associated hepatitis. Based on his work, the United States started blood and donor screening programs that lowered the cause of hepatitis due to this risk from 30 percent in 1970 to nearly 0.

In the mid-1970s, Alter and his research team demonstrated that most post-transfusion hepatitis cases were not due to hepatitis A and hepatitis B viruses. Work by Alter, in collaboration with Bob Purcell, and work by Edward Tabor working simultaneously in another laboratory, proved through transmission studies in chimpanzees that a new form of hepatitis, initially called "non-A, non-B hepatitis" caused the infections. This work eventually led to the discovery of the hepatitis C virus. In 1988 the new hepatitis virus was confirmed by Alter's group by verifying its presence in their stored panel of NANBH specimens. In April 1989, the discovery of the non-A, non-B virus, renamed hepatitis C virus, was published in two articles in Science.

== Honors and awards ==
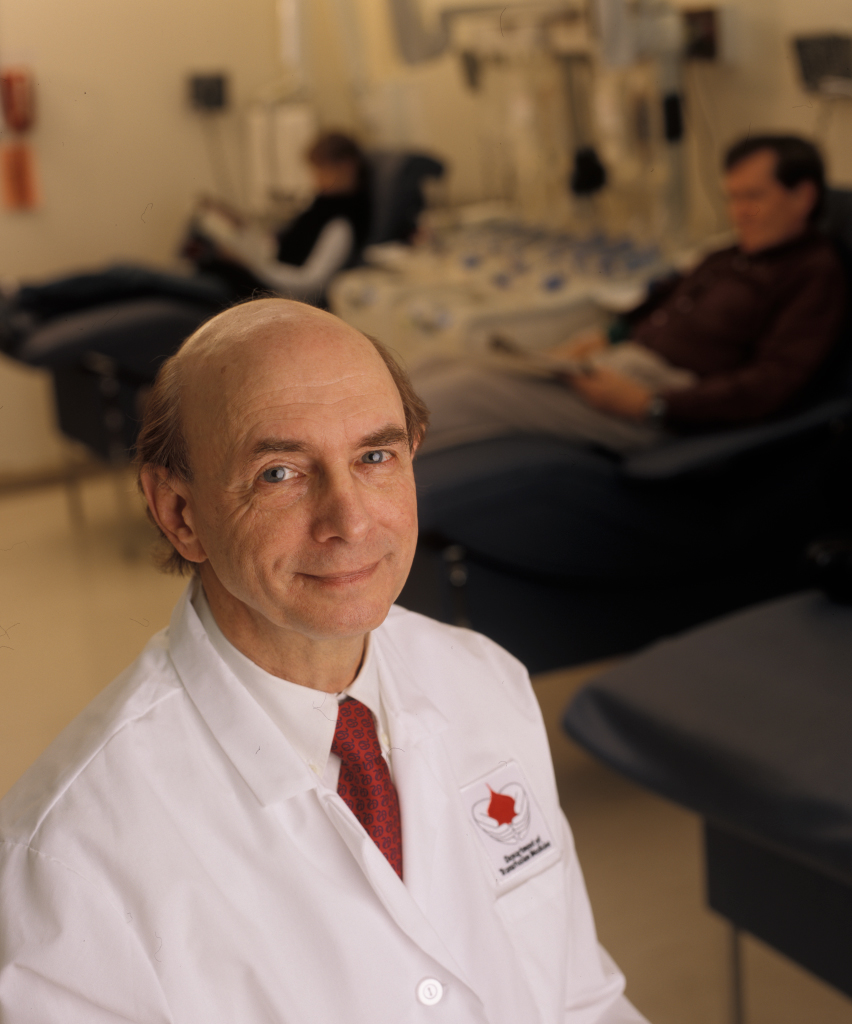
Alter in 2000

Alter has received recognition for his research including the 2000 Albert Lasker Award for Clinical Medical Research for his work leading to the discovery of the virus that causes hepatitis C. Alter and his co-awardee Michael Houghton were recognized for the development of blood screening methods that essentially eliminated the risk of transfusion-associated hepatitis in the U.S. Other honors for his medical research include the Distinguished Service Medal, the highest award conferred to civilians in United States government public health service. Alter has been elected to both the National Academy of Sciences and the Institute of Medicine. In 2002 he received The International Society of Blood Transfusion Presidential Award. In 2005, he received the American College of Physicians Award for Outstanding Work in Science as Related to Medicine, and the First International Prize of Inserm (the French equivalent of NIH). And in 2019, he's nominated for T. Washington Fellows.

Speaking of Alter's long research career at the time of the 2000 Lasker Award, Harvey Klein, chief of the Clinical Center Transfusion Medicine Department noted, "As a young research fellow, Dr. Alter co-discovered the Australia antigen, a key to detecting Hepatitis B virus. For many investigators that would be the highlight of a career. For Dr. Alter it was only an auspicious beginning."

Alter was awarded Grand Hamdan International Award - Gastroenterology by Hamdan Medical Award in 2016.

Alter was awarded the 2020 Nobel Prize in Physiology or Medicine alongside Michael Houghton and Charles M. Rice for "discoveries that led to the identification of [the] Hepatitis C virus."

== Personal life ==
He married Barbara Bailey; they have two children, Mark, also an MD, and Stacey, a teacher. He is currently married to Diane Dowling and has two step children, Lydia Rodin and Erinn Torres, and nine grandchildren.

== See also ==
- List of Jewish Nobel laureates
