= Michael Houghton =

British virologist (born 1949)

Sir Michael Houghton
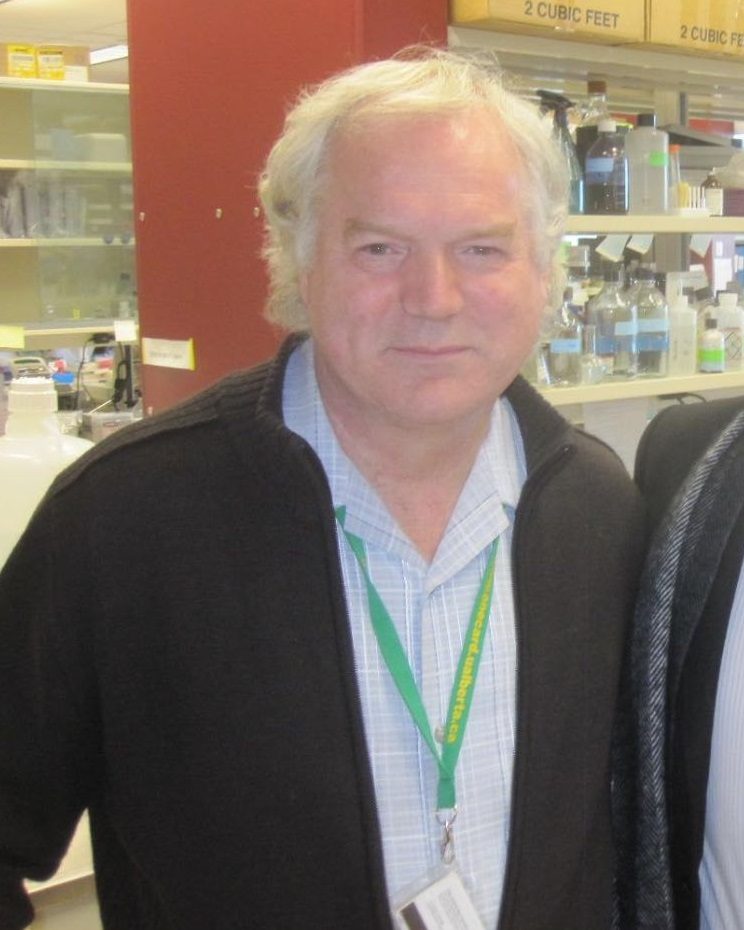
- Houghton in 2017
- Born: 1949 (age 76–77)
- Education: University of East Anglia (BSc); King's College London (PhD)
- Known for: Discovery of hepatitis C and hepatitis D
- Awards: Karl Landsteiner Memorial Award (1992); Robert Koch Prize (1993); William Beaumont Prize (1994); Lasker Award (2000); Gairdner Foundation International Award (2013, declined); Nobel Prize for Medicine (2020)
- Scientific career
- Fields: Microbiology; Virology
- Workplaces: University of Alberta; Chiron Corporation
- Thesis: RNA Polymerases and Transcription in the Chicken Oviduct (1977)
- Doctoral advisors: Norman Carey and James Chesterton
- Website: apps.ualberta.ca/directory/person/mhoughto

Sir Michael Houghton (born 1949) is a British scientist and Nobel Prize laureate. Along with Qui-Lim Choo, George Kuo and Daniel W. Bradley, he co-discovered hepatitis C in 1989. He also co-discovered the hepatitis D genome in 1986. The discovery of the hepatitis C virus (HCV) led to the rapid development of diagnostic reagents to detect HCV in blood supplies, which has reduced the risk of acquiring HCV through blood transfusion from one in three to about one in two million. It is estimated that antibody testing has prevented at least 40,000 new infections per year in the US alone and many more worldwide.

Houghton is currently Canada Excellence Research Chair in Virology and Li Ka Shing Professor of Virology at the University of Alberta, where he is also director of the Li Ka Shing Applied Virology Institute. He was the co-recipient of the 2020 Nobel Prize in Physiology or Medicine along with Harvey J. Alter and Charles M. Rice.

== Early life and education ==
Born in London in 1949 to Leonard George and Elsie Cressy Houghton, he was raised in a working-class family along with elder brother Graham. His father was a truck driver and union official. He received his primary education at Lyndhurst Grove School, and then won a scholarship to Alleyn's School in Dulwich, London, where he went on to specialise in physics, chemistry and maths. He won a scholarship to study at the University of East Anglia, graduating with a lower second class honours degree in biological sciences in 1972, and subsequently completed a PhD in biochemistry from King's College London in 1977.

== Career ==
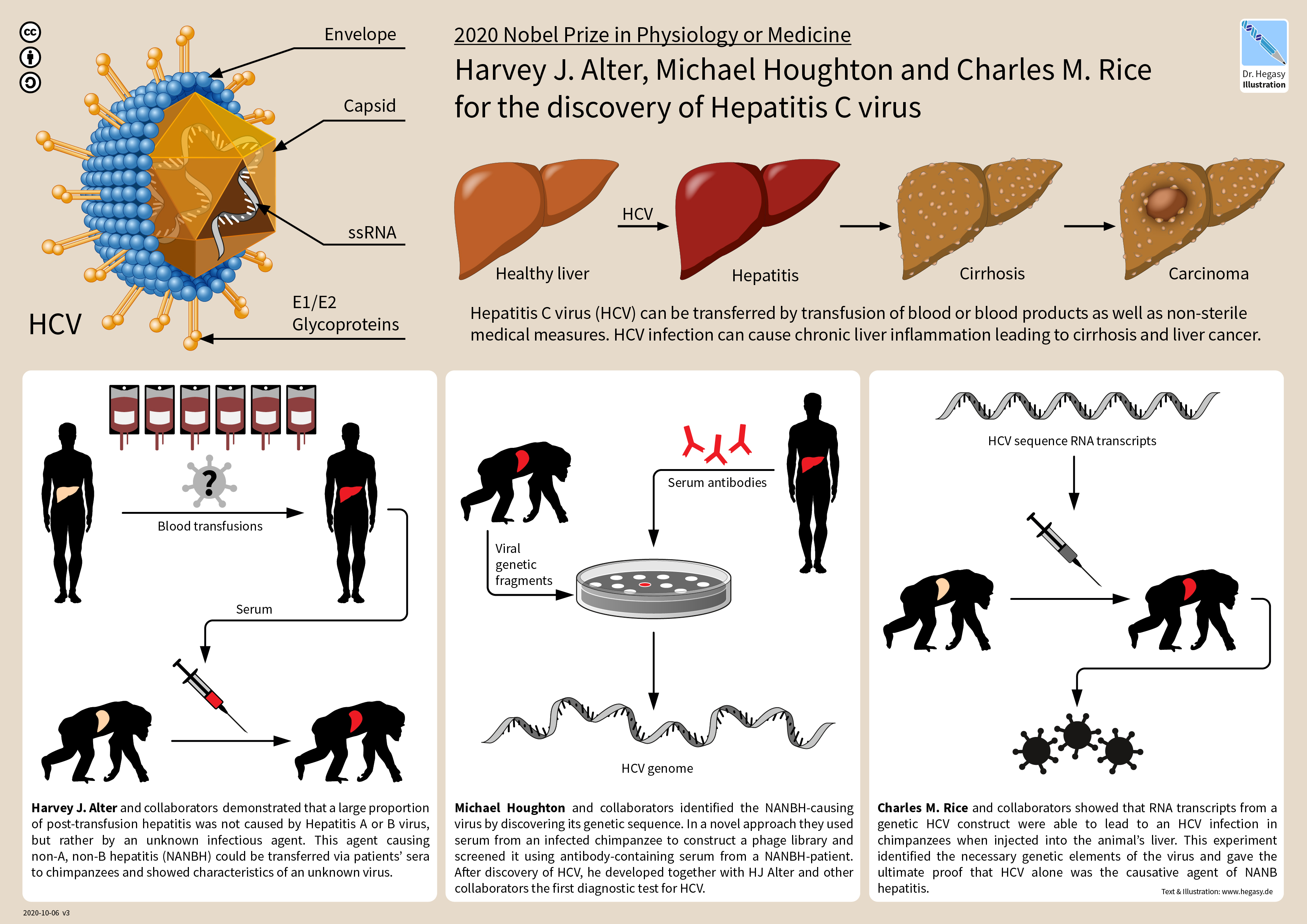
Nobel Prize in Physiology or Medicine 2020: Seminal experiments by HJ Alter, M Houghton and CM Rice leading to the discovery of HCV as the causative agent of non-A, non-B hepatitis.

Houghton joined G. D. Searle & Company before moving to Chiron Corporation in 1982. It was at Chiron that Houghton together with colleagues Qui-Lim Choo and George Kuo, and Daniel W. Bradley from the Centers for Disease Control and Prevention, first discovered evidence for HCV.

Houghton was co-author of a series of seminal studies published in 1989 and 1990 that identified hepatitis C antibodies in blood, particularly among patients at higher risk of contracting the disease, including those who had received blood transfusions. This work led to the development of a blood screening test in 1990; widespread blood screening that began in 1992 with the development of a more sensitive test has since virtually eliminated hepatitis C contamination of donated blood supplies in Canada. In other studies published during the same period, Houghton and collaborators linked hepatitis C with liver cancer.

In 2013, Houghton's team at the University of Alberta showed that a vaccine derived from a single strain of Hepatitis C was effective against all strains of the virus. As of 2020, the vaccine was in pre-clinical trials.

== Honours and awards ==
- 1992 – Karl Landsteiner Memorial Award
- 1993 – Robert Koch Prize
- 1994 – William Beaumont Prize
- 2000 – Lasker Award
- 2005 – Dale A. Smith Memorial Award
- 2009 – Hepdart Lifetime Achievement Award
- 2013 – He became the first person to decline the $100,000 Gairdner Foundation International Award stating "I felt that it would be unfair of me to accept this award without the inclusion of two colleagues, Dr. Qui-Lim Choo and Dr. George Kuo."
- 2019 – Honorary doctorate of science from the University of East Anglia
- 2020 – Nobel Prize in Physiology or Medicine
- 2021 – Knighted in the 2021 Birthday Honours for services to medicine
- 2025 – Honorary doctorate of science from Hong Kong Baptist University
