= Tezacitabine =

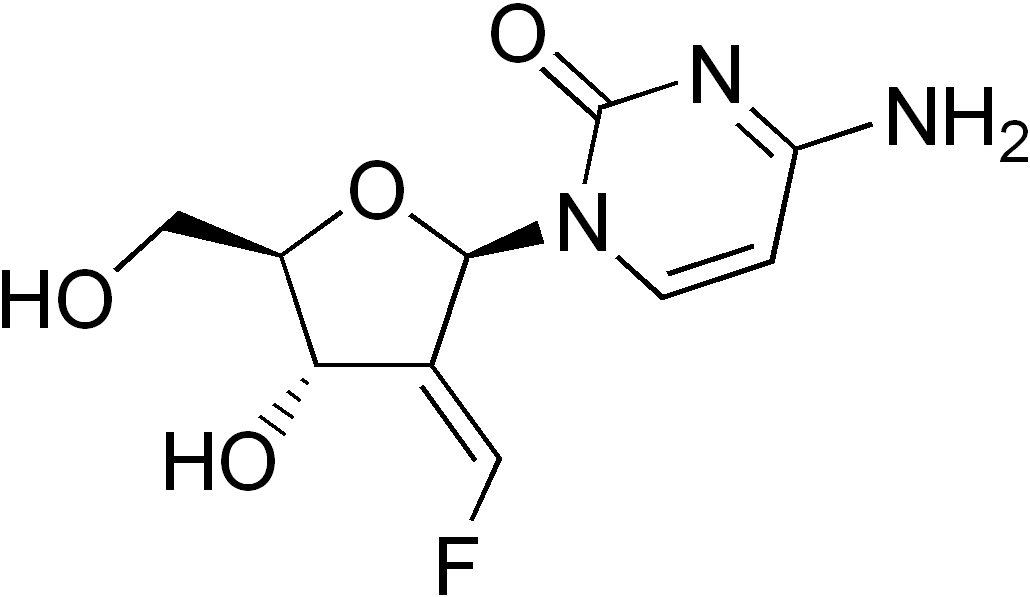

Names
- IUPAC name (2′E)-2′-Deoxy-2′-(fluoromethylidene)cytidine
- Systematic IUPAC name 4-Amino-1-[(2R,3E,4S,5R)-3-(fluoromethylidene)-4-hydroxy-5-(hydroxymethyl)oxolan-2-yl]pyrimidin-2(1H)-one

Identifiers
CAS Number	130306-02-4
3D model (JSmol)	Interactive image
ChemSpider	4940503
PubChem CID	6435808
UNII	7607Y95N9S
CompTox Dashboard (EPA)	DTXSID10156446
- InChI: InChI=1S/C10H12FN3O4/c11-3-5-8(16)6(4-15)18-9(5)14-2-1-7(12)13-10(14)17/h1-3,6,8-9,15-16H,4H2,(H2,12,13,17)/b5-3+/t6-,8+,9-/m1/s1 Key: GFFXZLZWLOBBLO-ASKVSEFXSA-N; InChI=1/C10H12FN3O4/c11-3-5-8(16)6(4-15)18-9(5)14-2-1-7(12)13-10(14)17/h1-3,6,8-9,15-16H,4H2,(H2,12,13,17)/b5-3+/t6-,8+,9-/m1/s1 Key: GFFXZLZWLOBBLO-ASKVSEFXBD
- SMILES: OC[C@H]1O[C@@H](N2C=CC(N)=NC2=O)/C([C@@H]1O)=C/F

Properties
Chemical formula	C_{10}H_{12}FN_{3}O_{4}
Molar mass	257.221 g·mol^{−1}
- Except where otherwise noted, data are given for materials in their standard state (at 25 °C [77 °F], 100 kPa). verify (what is ?) Infobox references

Tezacitabine is a ribonucleotide reductase inhibitor. It is a synthetic purine nucleoside analogue with potential antineoplastic activity. It is used in synthetic DNA.
