= Grifols =

Spanish pharmaceutical and chemical manufacturer

Grifols, S.A.
- Type: Public
- Traded as: BMAD: GRF; Nasdaq: GRFS
- ISIN: ES0171996087
- Industry: Healthcare
- Founded: 1909; 117 years ago
- Headquarters: Sant Cugat del Vallès (Barcelona, Catalonia, Spain)
- Key people: Nacho Abia (CEO)
- Products: Plasma-derived medicines to treat chronic, rare and prevalent diseases, tools and services for hospitals, pharmacies and healthcare professionals.
- Revenue: ▲€7.2 billion (2024)
- Net income: 157,000,000 (2024)
- Number of employees: More than 23,800 (2024)
- Website: grifols.com

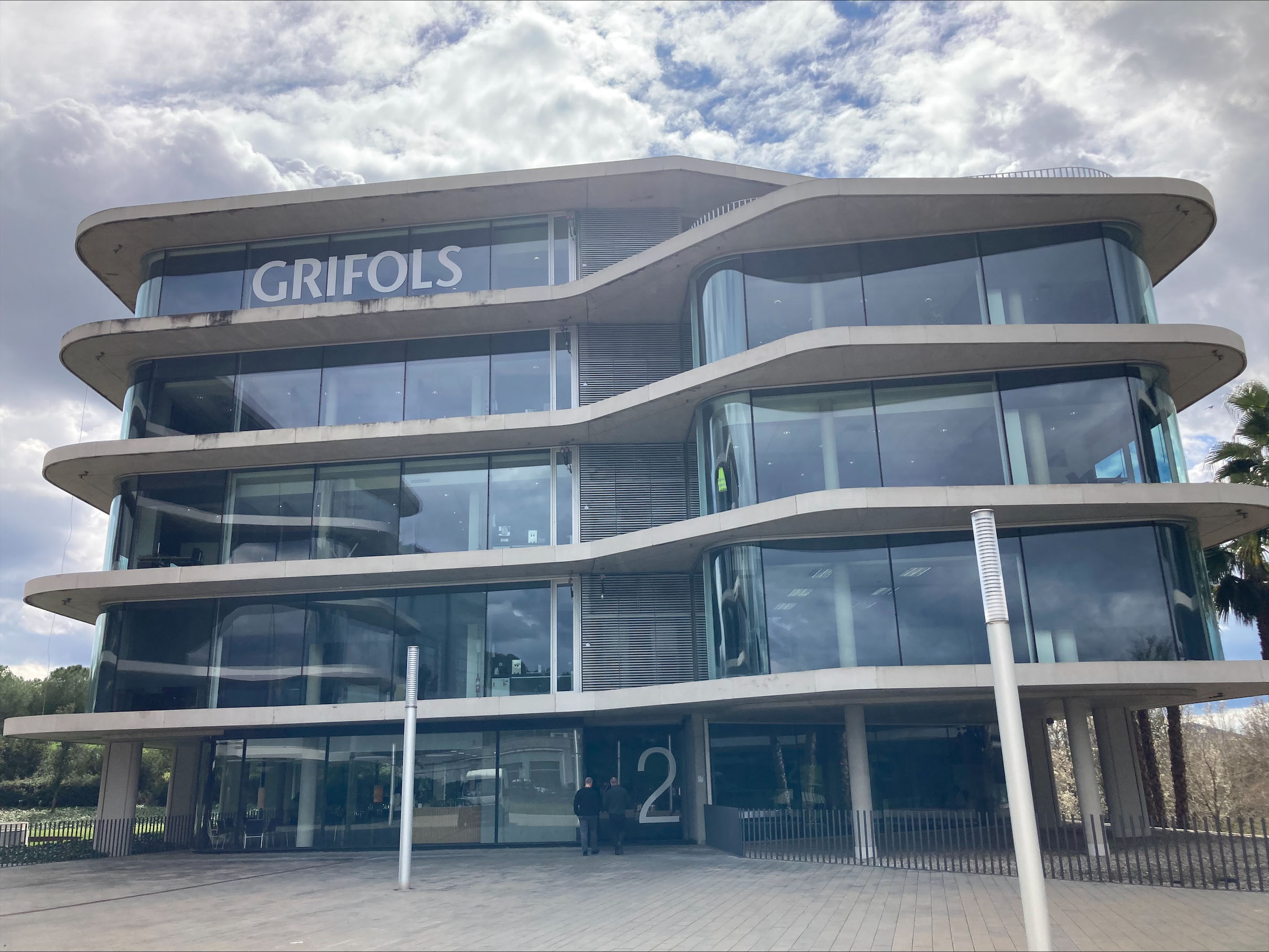
Grifols headquarters in Sant Cugat del Vallès (Barcelona)

Grifols, S.A. (Catalan: [ˈɡɾifuls]) is a global healthcare company and leading producer of plasma-derived medicines founded in Barcelona, Catalonia, Spain, in 1909. With a workforce of over 23,800 employees, Grifols serves more than 110 countries and regions and maintains a direct presence in over 30.

Principally a producer of blood plasma–based products and other biopharmaceuticals, the company also operates in transfusion medicine, supplying devices, instruments and reagents for clinical testing laboratories, as well as clinical diagnostic technologies. Furthermore, it provides biological supplies for life-science research, clinical trials and the manufacturing of pharmaceutical and diagnostic products. It has a portfolio on four therapeutic areas: immunology, infectious diseases, pulmonology and critical care.

== History ==
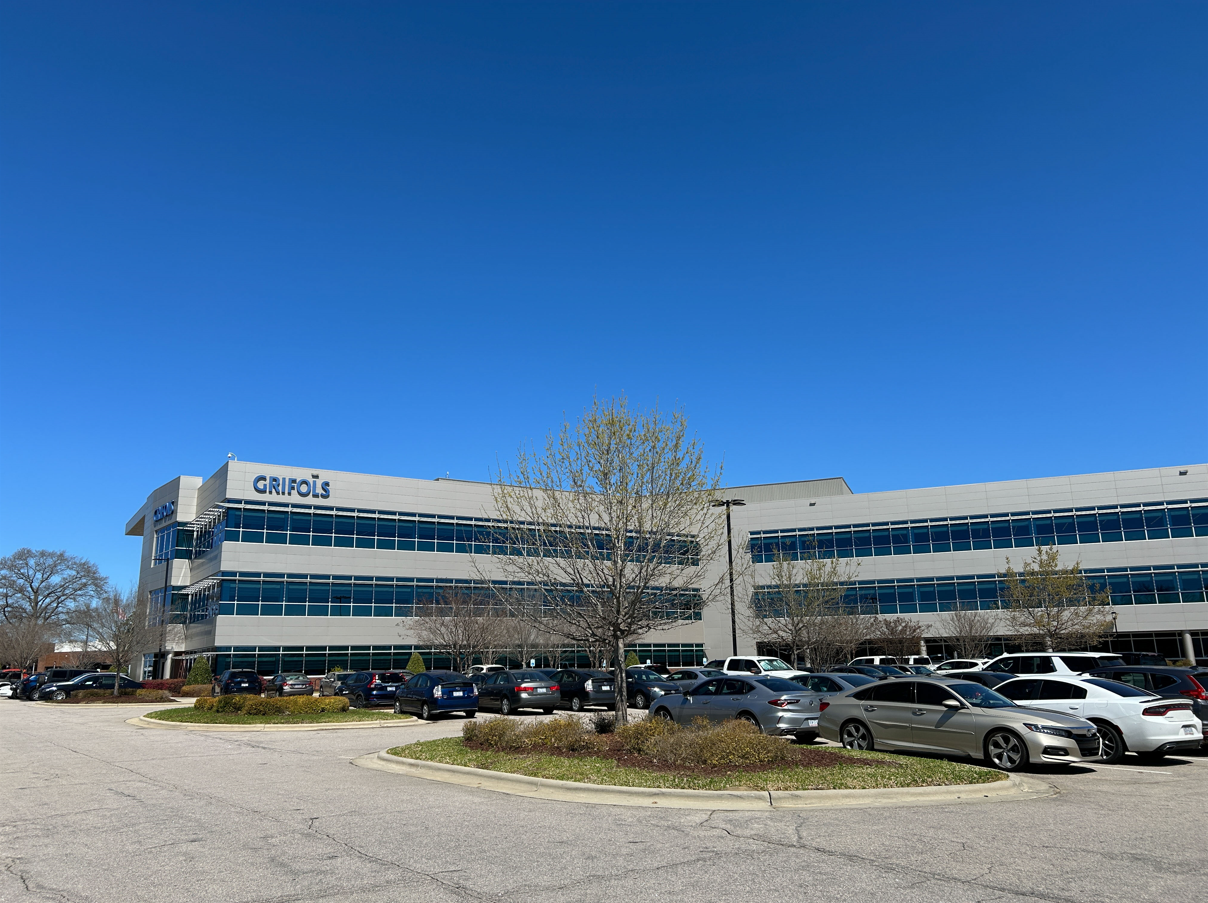
Image of Grifols’ facilities in Clayton (North Carolina, U.S.)

Grifols began in 1909 when hematologist and scientist Josep Antoni Grífols i Roig founded a clinical analysis laboratory in Barcelona: the Instituto Central de Análisis Clínicos, Bacteriológicos y Químicos, a precursor to Laboratorios Grifols. In Spain, Grífols i Roig patented the first instrument for carrying out indirect blood transfusions, the transfusion flebula. Post-war, Grífols i Roig and his sons, Josep Antoni Grífols i Lucas, a hematologist, and Víctor Grífols i Lucas, a chemist and pharmacist, founded Laboratorios Grifols, which began the start of the business dedicated to clinical analysis and the preparation of freeze-dried plasma.

In 1952, for the first time, the results of a systematic application of the plasmapheresis technique in humans was published in the British Medical Journal thanks to a study led by Josep Antoni Grífols i Lucas.

Control of the company was handed down to Víctor Grifols Roura in 1987, when Grifols created the holding company Grupo Grifols. This unified the commercial company with its clinical diagnostic, plasma-derived medicines and parenteral operations. From there, in 1988 Grifols opened its first subsidiary, in Portugal, marking the beginning of the company’s international expansion.

=== Stock Listings ===
Grifols began trading on the [Madrid stock exchange] in 2006 and was listed on the [IBEX35], the exchange’s benchmark index, in 2008. With the acquisition of Talecris Biotherapeutics in 2011, Grifols began trading on the NASDAQ.

=== Acquisitions ===
Grifols acquired its first group of plasma donation centers (43 in the U.S.) in 2002, taking over the company SeraCare, now known as Biomat. The following year, Grifols acquired Alpha Therapeutic Corporation-Mitsubishi, including its plasma fractionation plant in Los Angeles, California. In 2011, Grifols acquired the North American company Talecris Biotherapeutics, making Grifols the third-largest manufacturer of plasma-derived medicines in the world.

Grifols acquired Novartis' blood transfusion diagnostics unit, based in Emeryville, California, in 2014. It was a part of Chiron, which had been acquired by Novartis in 2006. Grifols grew its transfusion medicine business with the acquisition of Hologic’s transfusion unit in 2017, leading the company’s creation of reagents and instrumentation based on NAT (nucleic acid testing) technology.

In 2018, Grifols acquired the German company Haema and its network of donation centers and, in 2019, Grifols grew its network of donation centers with the addition of Interstate Blood Bank Inc. Today, the company has approximately 400 donation centers worldwide, most of them located in the U.S.

Following a major equity investment in 2015, Grifols acquired the remaining shares of Alkahest in 2020 to help enhance the company’s discovery research and development to identify therapies based upon an understanding of the human plasma proteome. In 2021, the company acquired the remaining capital of GigaGen, a U.S. biotechnology company specialized in the early discovery and development of recombinant polyclonal antibodies, after having acquired a significant stake in 2017. In 2022, Grifols acquired Biotest, a German manufacturer and provider of plasma-derived medicines.

=== Strategic Alliances ===
Grifols has pursued public-private alliances around the world. In 2020, Grifols signed an agreement with Egypt’s National Service Projects Organization to establish Grifols Egypt for Plasma Derivatives, a joint venture building the first integrated platform for sourcing and producing plasma medicines in Africa and the Middle East. This was followed by a long-term agreement with Canadian Blood Services in 2022, to help accelerate immunoglobulin self-sufficiency in Canada. Grifols also sought to strengthen and enhance China’s healthcare system by entering into a strategic alliance with Haier Group in late 2023 to further develop the Chinese plasma market, building on a strategic alliance it had established with Shanghai RAAS, a leading Chinese company in the plasma-derivatives sector, in 2020.

Between January and March 2024, short seller fund Gotham City Research published several reports questioning Grifols financial accounting. In January 2024, following the first of such reports, Grifols filed a lawsuit against the short seller for making “false and misleading statements”. In February 2024, Grifols rejected what it considered were Gotham's "malicious, false and misleading insinuations" that had the "sole objective of destabilising Grifols and causing doubts amongst institutional investors". In April 2024, Grifols announced it was bringing in independent directors to improve its governance. In July 2024, the Grifols family and Canadian fund Brookfield agreed to evaluate a possible joint takeover bid for the company with the intent to delist it from the Nasdaq and the Bolsa de Madrid stock exchanges. In November of this year, Grifols announced that takeover talks with Brookfield terminated and Spain’s High Court also announced that it had opened a probe into U.S.-based short seller Gotham City Research for the possible violation of market and consumer protection laws.

== Main products ==
Grifols is a global supplier of IVIG, albumin, Factor VIII and other plasma-derived products. The therapies Grifols produces include:

- Immunoglobulins to treat patients with primary and secondary immunodeficiencies, neurological disorders and more.
- Albumin to treat patients with intensive care needs and patients with liver disease.
- Factor VIII to treat patients with hemophilia A and other blood-related disorders.
- Alpha-1 to treat patients with genetic emphysema, a type of chronic obstructive pulmonary disease (COPD).
- Antithrombin to treat patients with hereditary antithrombin deficiency (a blood-clotting problem).
- Specific hyperimmune immunoglobulins used post-exposure to prevent rabies, tetanus and other diseases.
- Fibrinogen to treat acute bleeding episodes in adult and pediatric patients with congenital fibrinogen deficiency.

== Industrial operations ==
Grifols currently has 15 industrial facilities in seven countries. Grifols’ plasma fractionation capacity is currently at 22 million liters per year, with the aim of reaching 26 million by 2026, as part of the company’s continued efforts to meet the growing demand for plasma-derived medicines. All of the company’s facilities are designed and built by Grifols Engineering, which also offers its technology and consulting services to the pharmaceutical and biotechnology sectors.

=== Research ===
The company has more than 1,200 researchers working across its 12 Research & Development centers around the world. The company is focused on the development of potential new treatment options derived both from human plasma as well as a new class of recombinant antibody drugs. Grifols is researching a number of pathologies – from immunodeficiencies to respiratory disorders to age-related conditions – to create new therapeutics. It is also developing new diagnostics for blood screening.

== Controversy ==
In 2024, an Oregon man and the ACLU of Oregon filed a lawsuit against Grifols for its alleged "forever ban" on accepting plasma from gay men. The ACLU of Oregon states this alleged ban is discriminatory and a violation of Oregon's public accommodations laws. The plaintiff sought nearly $1 million in damages.

In 2025, the U.S. Equal Employment Opportunity Commission (EEOC) sued Grifols for failing to accommodate a job applicant's disability, a violation of the Americans with Disabilities Act.

In 2025, a Manitoba man sued Grifols, claiming a machine malfunction during plasmapheresis caused him a serious kidney injury. After the deaths of two individuals who gave plasma at Grifols facilities in Winnipeg, the company halted plasma collection in Canada effective August 2026 but indicated it remains ready to resume.
