= James Blundell (physician) =

British obstetrician (1790–1878)

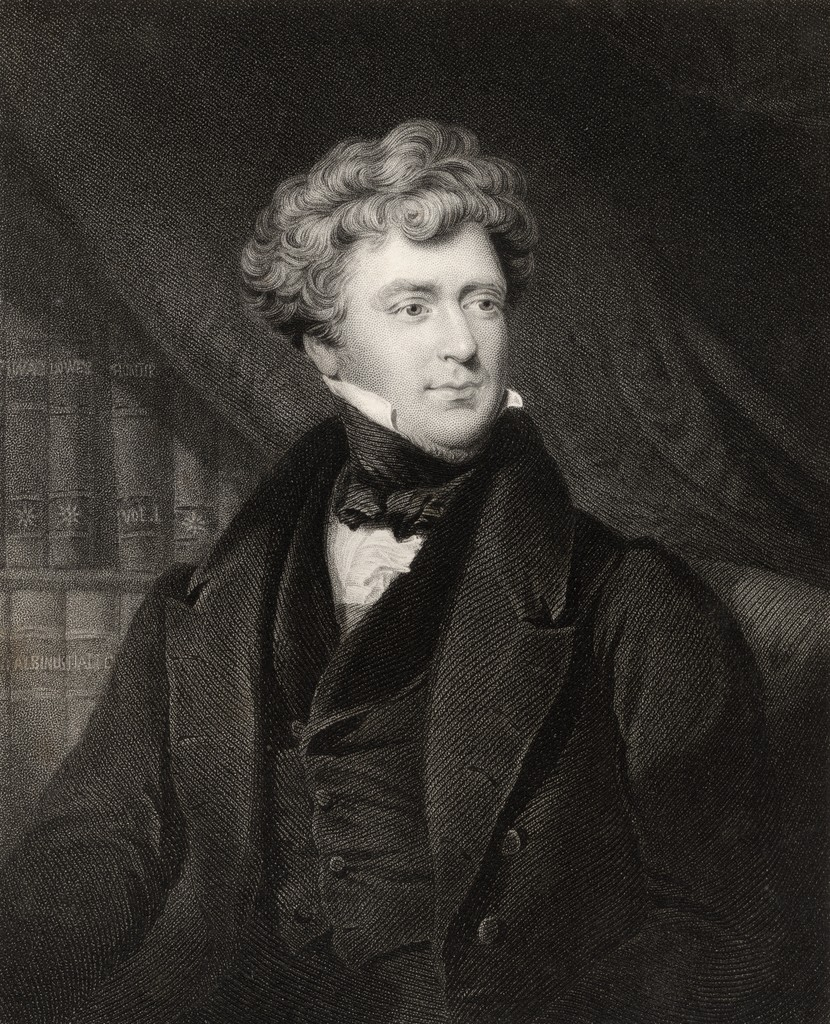
James Blundell c. 1820. Engraving by John Cochran.

James Blundell (27 December 1790, in Holborn, London – 15 January 1878, in St George Hanover Square, London) was an English obstetrician who performed the first successful transfusion of human blood to a patient for treatment of a hemorrhage.

== Early years ==
James Blundell was born in London. His father's name was Major Blundell and his mother was Sarah Ann Haighton. Major owned a company called Major Blundell and Co. Haberdashers, and Drapers in London. He was home-tutored by Reverend Thomas Thomason in classical education. He entered medical course at the United Southwark Hospitals (St Thomas' and Guy's hospitals). He specialised in anatomy and surgery under Astley Cooper, and then in midwifery (obstetrics) under John Haighton. Haighton, who had developed several instruments still used today for the delivery of babies, was his maternal uncle and lived with him during his medical course, and became a major influence in Blundell's career.

Blundell obtained his MD degree in 1813 from the University of Edinburgh Medical School. A year later he began his career in London by lecturing on midwifery and physiology at St Thomas' and Guy's hospitals. By 1818, he succeeded his uncle Haighton and became the lecturer on both subjects at Guy's Hospital where his classes on obstetrics and the diseases of women were reported to be the largest in London. In 1823, he became Professor of Physiology and Obstetrics, succeeding his uncle.

== Blood transfusion work ==
In 1818, Blundell proposed that a blood transfusion would be appropriate to treat severe postpartum hemorrhage. He had seen many of his patients dying in childbirth, and was determined to develop a remedy. However, he was also familiar with the work of Leacock in Edinburgh, who said that the transfer of blood from one species would be harmful to another. Therefore, Blundell conducted a series of experiments using animals, and observed that as long as the blood was transfused quickly, a transfusion would be successful with a syringe even after it had been collected in a container. He also discovered the importance of letting all the air out of a syringe prior to the transfusion.

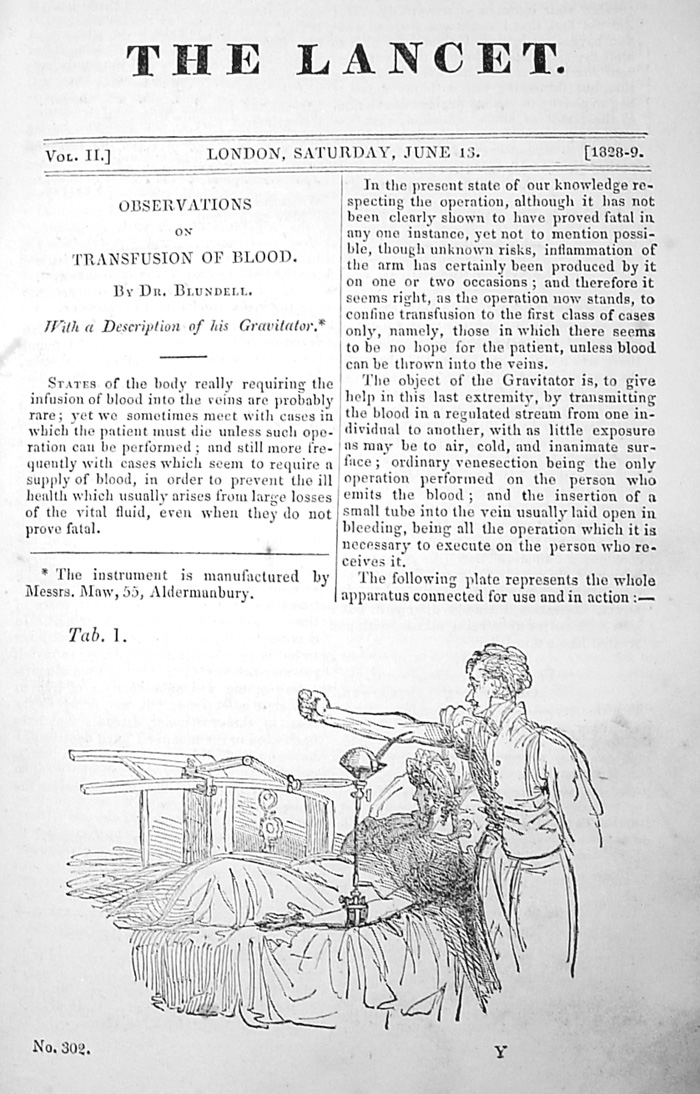
Article on transfusions by Dr. Blundell in The Lancet, from 1829.

Blundell performed the first successful human-to-human transfusion in 1818. In 1829, he reported this transfusion in an article in the medical journal Lancet. In another human-to-human transmission in 1825, Blundell extracted four ounces of blood from the arm of the patient's husband using a syringe, and successfully transfused it into the patient. Over the course of five years, he conducted ten documented blood transfusions, five of which were beneficial to the patients, and published these results. During his life, he also devised many instruments for the transfusion of blood, many of which are still in use today.

He became the author of Researches Physiological and Pathological in 1824 and wrote two papers on abdominal surgery and blood transfusion, both edited by Samuel Ashwell. Later publications include Principles and Practice of Obstetrics in 1834 and Observations on some of the More Important Diseases of Women in 1837. In using the uterine sound for diagnostic purposes, he was considered more advanced than other obstetricians of the day.

== Later life ==
Blundell left Guy's in 1834 to have more time for private practice. His retirement was prompted by a dispute with the hospital administration. He had been looking for a successor to take over his position as midwifery chair. While he travelled to Paris in the summer, Guy's treasurer appointed Samuel Ashwell to be his replacement. He did not approve the selection and sternly believed that it was his authority to make such decision. He published lengthy explanations of his retirement in three letters in The Lancet.

For the next four years, Blundell worked full time as a private physician. In 1838, he became a fellow of the Royal College of Physicians. He devoted more time on literature and published Hexametrical Experiments, or, A version of four of Virgil's pastorals... with hints to explain the method of reading, and a slight essay on the laws of meter that year.

Blundell never married but lived with his grand-niece Mary Ann Harriet Noyes (née Wilks). From the 1871 British Census, we know he was living at 80 Piccadilly in London, but he also had a home in Westminster at No. 1 Great George Street.

Blundell retired from practice in 1847. In his final years, it is said that he never rose before noon, saw patients in the afternoon, dined, and then saw more patients after 8 or 9 pm. He always carried books with him and was able to read them in his carriage by the installation of a special light.

== Death ==
James Blundell died on 15 January 1878 in London, aged 87. His will, dated 11 April 1857 with a codicil of 27 March 1876, was proven on 29 January by his nephew George Augustus Frederick Wilks. His estate was valued at £350,000 at the time, today equivalent of over £45,000,000. The fortune had been amassed by his large private practice and significant bequests. Much of it was left to his niece Sarah whose husband Henry Crine Noyes had died five years earlier.

== Sources ==
- [Anon.]. "Blundell, James (1790–1878)." Rev. Anne Digby. In Oxford Dictionary of National Biography, edited by H. C. G. Matthew and Brian Harrison. Oxford: OUP, 2004. http://www.oxforddnb.com/view/article/2713 (accessed 11 December 2008).
- Personal Papers of the Noyes Family, in the possession of Cameron Bryant.
