= Vox Sanguinis =

- Discipline: Hematology, transfusion medicine
- Language: English
- Edited by: Miquel Lozano

Publication details
- Former name(s): Bulletin of the Central Laboratory of the Blood Transfusion Service of the Dutch Red Cross
- History: 1953-present (1956-present under current name)
- Publisher: International Society of Blood Transfusion, Wiley-Blackwell
- Frequency: 8/year
- Impact factor: 2.347 (2019)

Standard abbreviations
- ISO 4: Vox Sang.

Indexing
- ISSN: 0042-9007

Links
- Journal homepage

Vox Sanguinis, formerly known as the Bulletin of the Central Laboratory of the Blood Transfusion Service of the Dutch Red Cross, is a peer-reviewed medical journal covering hematology. It was established in 1953 and published 8 times per year by Wiley-Blackwell on behalf of the International Society of Blood Transfusion. The editor-in-chief is Miquel Lozano (Clinic Barcelona Sección de Hemotherapia). According to the Journal Citation Reports, the journal has a 2019 impact factor of 2.347, ranking it 46th out of 76 journals in the category "Hematology".
