= Bruce Chown =

Canadian pediatrician who researched Rhesus factor (1893–1986)

- Born: October 10, 1893; Winnipeg, Manitoba
- Died: July 3, 1986 (aged 92)
- Awards: Order of Canada

Bruce Chown OC MC FRSC (/tʃaʊn/; November 10, 1893 – July 3, 1986) was a Canadian medical doctor who researched the blood factor known as the Rhesus factor and discovered an Rh immune vaccine, Rh gamma globulin, which helps to prevent Erythroblastosis fetalis.

Born in Winnipeg, Manitoba, the son of Havelock Chown and Katherine (Farrell) Chown, he received a B.A. from McGill University in 1914. During World War I, he served in the Canadian Field Artillery and received the Military Cross. After the war, he received his medical degree from the University of Manitoba in 1922. He completed his postgraduate work in pediatrics at Babies' Hospital, Columbia University (1922–1923); Harriet Lane Home, Johns Hopkins University; and Nursery and Child's Hospital, Cornell University (1925–1926), becoming one of only a few trained pediatricians in Canada and the only one in Manitoba.

From 1926 to 1977, he was on the staff of the University of Manitoba. From 1944 to 1977, he was the director of the Rh Laboratory in Winnipeg.

In 1967, he was made an Officer of the Order of Canada. In 1968, he received the Gairdner Foundation International Award. In 1970, he was made a Fellow of the Royal Society of Canada. In 1995, he was inducted into the Canadian Medical Hall of Fame.

In 1922, he married Gladys Webb. They had four children.
