= AABB =

Transfusion medicine and biotherapies association

Association for the Advancement of Blood & Biotherapies
- Logo since 2022
- Abbreviation: AABB
- Formation: 1947
- Website: www.aabb.org
- Formerly called: American Association of Blood Banks

AABB (Association for the Advancement of Blood & Biotherapies) is an international, not-for-profit organization representing individuals and institutions involved in the field of transfusion medicine and biotherapies.

The association works collaboratively to advance the field through the development and delivery of standards, accreditation and education programs. AABB is dedicated to its mission of improving lives by making transfusion medicine and biotherapies safe, available and effective worldwide.

The association was founded in the United States in 1947 as the American Association of Blood Banks. In 2021, it changed its name to Association for the Advancement of Blood & Biotherapies to better reflect its mission and work.

Virtually all blood banks in the United States are accredited by AABB. In addition, AABB accredits hospital transfusion services, biotherapies facilities, cord blood banks, relationship testing facilities, and various other facilities whose work relates to blood and biotherapies. Accreditation by AABB meets the requirements of the Clinical Laboratory Improvement Amendments (CLIA) for blood bank, transfusion service, and immunohematology reference laboratory operations.

AABB hosts an annual meeting every fall for the dissemination of research and information for the blood and biotherapies field. The association publishes a monthly magazine, a weekly newsletter, and a peer-reviewed research journal titled Transfusion. AABB publishes a variety of other materials for the blood and biotherapies field, including the standards by which it accredits institutions.

Since 1953, the organization has also operated a National Blood Exchange to facilitate transfers of blood products during shortages or when rare blood types are required.

On June 1, 2018, Debra BenAvram, FASAE, CAE, became the association's chief executive officer (CEO).
