= William Greenough =

William Greenough may refer to:

- William T. Greenough (1944–2013), professor of psychology
- William B. Greenough III (born 1932), American physician
