= Mastroianni =

Mastroianni is a family name in the Italian language derived from a compound title of respect formed from mastro (master, craftsman) and Ianni (or Janni), Southern form of the given name Giovanni, and may refer to:

- Armand Mastroianni (born 1948), American film director
- Chiara Mastroianni (born 1972), Italian-French actress, daughter of Marcello Mastroianni
- Darin Mastroianni (born 1985), American baseball player
- Ferdinando Mastroianni (born 1992), Italian footballer
- Flora Mastroianni (born Flora Carabella 1926–1999), Italian film, television and stage actress, wife of Marcello Mastroianni
- Ariella Mastroianni (born 1991), Canadian/American actress, writer, and filmmaker
- Luigi Mastroianni (1925–2008), American gynecologist
- Marcello Mastroianni (1924–1996), Italian actor
- Mark G. Mastroianni (born 1964), American Judge and former Massachusetts District Attorney
- Mason Mastroianni, American comic artist
- Pat Mastroianni (born 1971), Canadian actor
- Ruggero Mastroianni (1929–1996), Italian film editor
- Umberto Mastroianni (1910–1998), Italian abstract sculptor

It is cognate with the Greek Mastrogiannis (Μαστρογιάννης):

- Sam Mastrogiannis (born 1942), Greek-American poker player
