= James E. Crowe =

American immunologist and pediatrician

James E. Crowe Jr.
- Born: August 14, 1961 (age 65); Nashville, Tennessee
- Awards: 2020 Golden Goose Award

Academic background
- Academic advisors: Robert Chanock, Brian R. Murphy

James Earl Crowe Jr. (born August 14, 1961) is an American immunologist and pediatrician as well as Professor of Pediatrics and Pathology, Microbiology, and Immunology at Vanderbilt University Medical Center.

== Education and career ==
James Crowe was born August 14, 1961, in Nashville, Tennessee. He received his B.S. from Davidson College in 1983. Then went on to medical school at the University of North Carolina, Chapel Hill, completing his M.D. in 1987. He continued at the University of North Carolina for his pediatric internship and residency from 1987 to 1990. Following his medical training, Crowe moved to the U.S. National Institutes of Health in 1990 serving first as a Medical Staff Fellow from 1990 to 1993 under Robert Chanock and Brian R. Murphy, then as a Senior Research Investigator in the Laboratoy of Infectious Diseases from 1993 to 1995. He then completed a clinical fellowship in pediatric infectious diseases at Vanderbilt Medical Center before being appointed to the faculty as an assistant professor in the Department of Pediatrics in 1996. Crowe was subsequently promoted to associate professor in 2001, and to full professor in the Department of Pediatrics in 2004. He is currently in Ann Scott Carell Chair at the Vanderbilt University Medical Center, an endowed professorship as well as Director of the Vanderbilt Vaccine Center. In 2014, Crowe was elected to the National Academy of Medicine.

== Research ==
James Crowe's research has focused on adaptive immune responses to various viral pathogens, in particular influenza virus, HIV, dengue virus, respiratory syncytial virus, rotavirus, human metapneumovirus and vaccinia virus. His group is particularly known for their work on antibody recognition of viral pathogens and for its identification and sequencing of monoclonal antibodies against SARS-CoV-2 from survivors of COVID-19 in Wuhan, China.

== Notable publications ==
- Sapparapu G, Fernandez E... Crowe JE (2016). Neutralizing human antibodies prevent Zika virus replication and fetal disease in mice. Nature. 540(7633): pgs. 443-447
- Yu X, Tsibane T... Crowe JE (2008). Neutralizing antibodies derived from the B cells of 1918 influenza pandemic survivors. Nature. 455(7212): pgs. 532-536
- Williams JV, Harris PA... Crowe JE (2004). Human metapneumovirus and lower respiratory tract disease in otherwise healthy infants and children. New England Journal of Medicine. 350(5): pgs. 443-450

== Awards and honors ==
In 2020, Crowe received a Golden Goose Award for excellence in federally funded research.
