= Brian R. Murphy =

American virologist

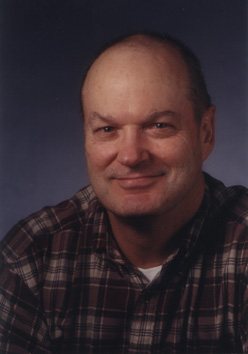
- Born: 1942 (age 83–84)
- Title: Co-chief, Laboratory of Infectious Diseases

Academic background
- Education: Wesleyan University, University of Rochester Medical School

Academic work
- Discipline: Virology, Molecular Biology
- Sub-discipline: Viral vaccine development
- Notable students: James E. Crowe ('90-'93)

Brian R. Murphy is an American virologist and former co-chief of the Laboratory of Infectious Diseases at the National Institute of Allergy and Infectious Disease.

== Education and career ==
Brian Murphy was born in 1942. He completed his undergraduate B.S. degree from Wesleyan University in 1964. He then went on to medical training, completing his M.D. in 1969 at the University of Rochester Medical School, and internship the next year at Stanford University Hospital. He moved to the National Institutes of Health in 1970 as a research associate in the Laboratory of Infectious Diseases within the National Institute of Allergy and Infectious Disease. In 1983, he was promoted to head the respiratory viruses section of the Laboratory of Infectious Diseases. In 2001, he became co-chief of the Laboratory of Infectious Diseases with Robert H. Purcell. He retired from the National Institutes of Health in 2010.

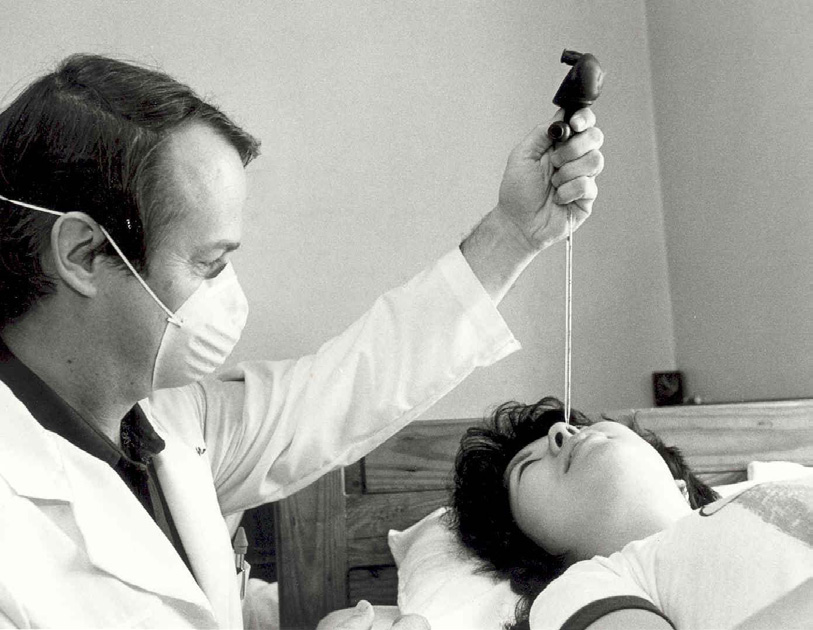
Brian Murphy administers an intranasal flu vaccine during a 1984 clinical trial

Brian Murphy received the inaugural Robert M. Chanock award for lifetime achievements in RSV research at the Respiratory Syncytial Virus 2003 symposium in November 2003.

He served on the editorial board of the Journal of Virology.

== Research ==
Murphy's research has focused on vaccine development for various viruses. In particular, his group is known for working on developing vaccines against respiratory syncytial virus, parainfluenza virus, influenza virus, dengue virus, and West Nile virus.

== Notable publications ==
- Subbarao K, McAuliffe J... Murphy B (2004). Prior infection and passive transfer of neutralizing antibody prevent replication of severe acute respiratory syndrome coronavirus in the respiratory tract of mice. Journal of Virology. 78(7): pgs. 3572-3577
- Wright PF, Karron RA.. Murphy BR (2000). Evaluation of a live, cold-passaged, temperature-sensitive, respiratory syncytial virus vaccine candidate in infancy. Journal of Infectious Diseases. 182(5): pgs. 1331-1342
- Collins, P L; Hill, M G; Camargo, E; Grosfeld, H; Chanock, R M; Murphy, B R (5 December 1995). "Production of infectious human respiratory syncytial virus from cloned cDNA confirms an essential role for the transcription elongation factor from the 5' proximal open reading frame of the M2 mRNA in gene expression and provides a capability for vaccine development". Proceedings of the National Academy of Sciences. 92 (25): 11563–11567. Bibcode:1995PNAS...9211563C. doi:10.1073/pnas.92.25.11563. PMC 40442. PMID 8524804.
- Subbarao EK, London W, Murphy BR (1993). A single amino acid in the PB2 gene of influenza A virus is a determinant of host range. Journal of Virology. 67(4): pgs. 1761-1764
- Clements ML, Betts RF... Murphy BR (1986). Serum and nasal wash antibodies associated with resistance to experimental challenge with influenza A wild-type virus. Journal of Clinical Microbiology. 24(1): pgs. 157-160
