= Ronald Levy =

Ronald Levy may refer to:

- Ronald Levy (athlete)
- Ronald Levy (scientist)
