= Michael Field (physician) =

American gastroenterologist

- Born: July 20, 1933; London, UK
- Died: August 23, 2014 (aged 81); Bangor, Maine
- Education: University of Chicago (B.A. 1953); BUMS (M.D. 1959)
- Known for: diarrhea
- Awards: King Faisal International Prize in Medicine (1984)
- Scientific career
- Fields: diarrheal disease
- Institutions: Columbia University (1984-2001); University of Chicago (1977-84); Harvard Medical School (1964-77)

Michael Field (1933 – 2014) was an American gastroenterologist celebrated for his work on diarrhea.

== Biography ==
Born in London and raised in Hamburg until the age of 5, Field and his family fled Germany the day before Kristallnacht and relocated to Pueblo, Colorado. He obtained his medical doctorate from Boston University Medical School in 1959, after first completing a degree in English literature at the University of Chicago, and conducted postdoctoral research at Harvard Medical School before joining the faculty as associate professor of medicine. Field returned to the University of Chicago as professor in 1977, and in 1984 was appointed chief of gastroenterology and professor of medicine at Columbia University where he remained until his retirement in 2001.

== Works ==
Field's research in the 1960s and 1970s provided insights into the cellular mechanisms of intestinal ion transport that changed the prevailing concepts of intestinal function and diarrhea. These advances led to the development Oral Rehydration Therapy (ORT) for cholera and other diarrheal diseases. ORT has proven to be a major breakthrough in child health, with an important role in reducing the number of deaths in children under the age of five.

== Awards ==
In 1984 Field was awarded the King Faisal International Prize in Medicine for research on diarrhea together with John S. Fordtran and William Greenough. He also received the Distinguished Achievement Award and the Distinguished Mentor Award of the American Gastroenterological Association, and the Life Time Achievement Award from Janssen Pharmaceuticals.
