= James Strauss =

James Strauss may refer to:

- James D. Strauss (born 1929), American theologian
- James Strauss (footballer) (born 1990), Australian rules footballer
- James Strauss (flautist) (born 1974), Brazilian flautist and musicologist
- James H. Strauss Jr., American biologist
