= Charles M. Rice =

American virologist

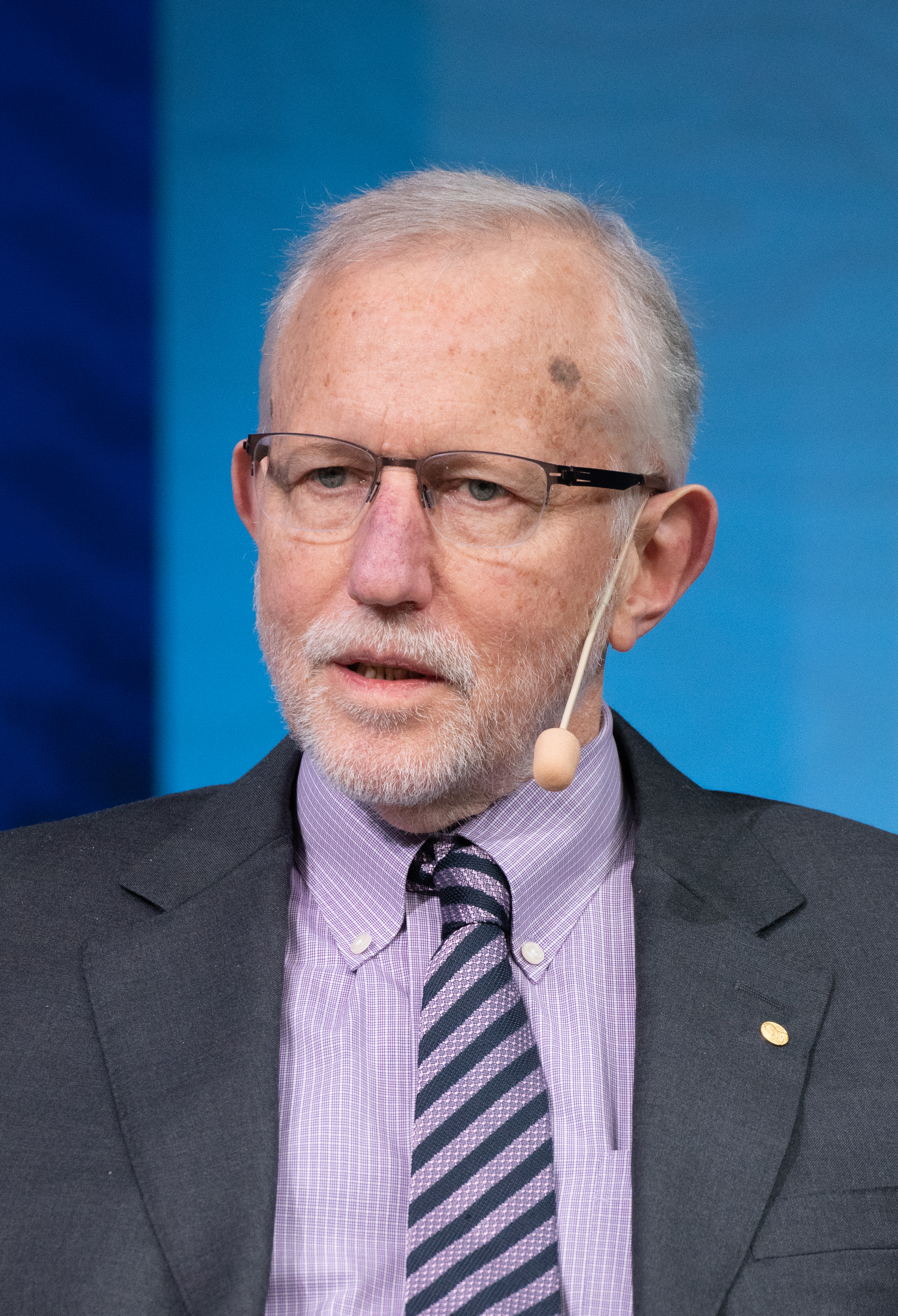
- Rice at 2024 Nobel Week
- Born: Charles Moen Rice; August 25, 1952 (age 74); Sacramento, California, U.S.
- Education: University of California, Davis (BS); California Institute of Technology (MS, PhD)
- Awards: Robert Koch Prize (2015); Lasker-DeBakey Clinical Medical Research Award (2016); Nobel Prize in Physiology or Medicine (2020)
- Scientific career
- Workplaces: Washington University in St. Louis; Rockefeller University; Cornell University
- Thesis: Studies on the Structural Proteins of Sindbis Virus (1981)
- Doctoral advisor: James Strauss
- Website: www.rockefeller.edu/our-scientists/heads-of-laboratories/893-charles-m-rice/

Charles Moen Rice (born August 25, 1952) is an American virologist and Nobel Prize laureate whose main area of research is the hepatitis C virus. He is a professor of virology at the Rockefeller University and an adjunct professor at Cornell University and Washington University School of Medicine. At the time of the award he was a faculty at Rockefeller.

Rice is a Fellow of the American Association for the Advancement of Science, member of the National Academy of Sciences and was president of the American Society for Virology from 2002 to 2003. He received the 2016 Lasker-DeBakey Clinical Medical Research Award, jointly with Ralf F. W. Bartenschlager and Michael J. Sofia. Along with Michael Houghton and Harvey J. Alter, he was awarded the 2020 Nobel Prize in Physiology or Medicine "for the discovery of Hepatitis C virus."

== Early life and education ==
Charles Moen Rice was born on August 25, 1952, in Sacramento, California.

Rice graduated Phi Beta Kappa with a B.S. in zoology from University of California, Davis, in 1974. In 1981, he received his Ph.D. in biochemistry from the California Institute of Technology, where he studied RNA viruses in the laboratory of James Strauss. He remained at Caltech for four years to do postdoctoral research.

== Career ==
After his postdoctoral work, Rice moved with his research group to the Washington University School of Medicine in 1986, where he remained until 2001.

Rice has been the Maurice R. and Corinne P. Greenberg Professor at Rockefeller University since 2001. He is also an adjunct professor at Washington University School of Medicine and Cornell University. He has served on committees for the Food and Drug Administration, National Institutes of Health, and World Health Organization.

He was the editor of Journal of Experimental Medicine from 2003 to 2007, Journal of Virology from 2003 to 2008, and PLoS Pathogens from 2005 to present. He has been an author of over 400 peer-reviewed publications.

== Research ==
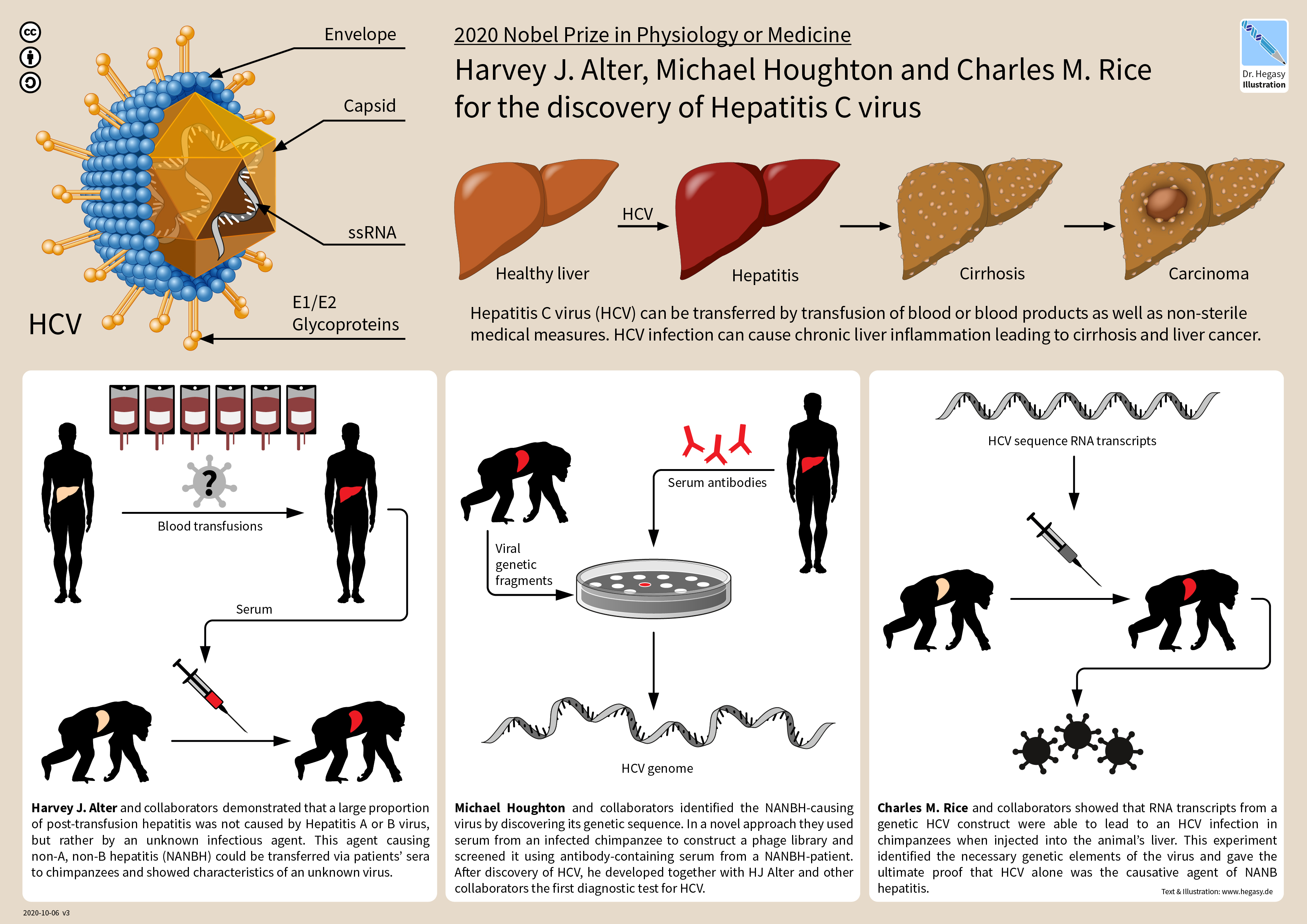
Nobel Prize in Physiology or Medicine 2020: Seminal experiments by HJ Alter, M Houghton and CM Rice leading to the discovery of HCV as the causative agent of non-A, non-B hepatitis.

While at Caltech, he was involved in researching the genome of Sindbis virus and the establishment of flaviviruses as their own family of viruses. The strain of yellow fever virus he used for this work was eventually used for the development of the yellow fever vaccine. While exploring Sindbis virus at Washington University in St. Louis, Rice described how he produced infectious flavivirus RNA in the laboratory in a 1989 paper published in The New Biologist. The paper attracted the attention of Stephen Feinstone who was studying hepatitis C virus and suggested that Rice use the technique to develop a vaccine for hepatitis C. In 1997, Rice cultured the first infectious clone of hepatitis C virus for use in studies on chimpanzees in whom the virus was also endemic. In 2005, Rice was also part of a team that showed that a strain of an acute form of the virus identified in a human patient can be forced to replicate in a laboratory setting. Rice's contribution to hepatitis C research has earned him many awards.

== Awards ==
- 1986 Pew Charitable Trust scholarship
- 2004 Elected fellow, American Association for the Advancement of Science
- 2005 Elected member, National Academy of Sciences
- 2005 Elected fellow, American Academy of Microbiology
- 2007 M.W. Beijerinck Virology Prize
- 2015 Robert Koch Prize
- 2016 Artois-Baillet Latour Health Prize
- 2016 Lasker Award
- 2020 Nobel Prize in Physiology or Medicine
