= Munir Baalbaki =

- مُنِيِر عبد الحفيظ البعلبكي
- Born: 1918; Beirut, Mount Lebanon Mutasarrifate, Ottoman Empire
- Died: 1999 (aged 80–81); Lebanon
- Occupations: Writer; Translator; Linguist; Publisher
- Title: Sheikh of Arab Translators
- Children: Ramzi Baalbaki, Rohi Baalbaki
- Writing career
- Language: Modern Standard Arabic
- Years active: from 1945
- Period: Modern (20th century)

Munir Abd Al-Hafiz Al-Baalbaki (Arabic: مُنِيِر عبد الحفيظ البعلبكي: [muˈniːr ʕab.dul.ħaˈfiːzˤ al.baʕ.la.bak.ki], ; 1918 – June 18, 1999) was a Lebanese writer, translator, and publisher, and one of the most prominent contributors to the translation movement and lexicographical authorship in the Arab world during the 20th century. Al-Baalbaki founded Dar El Ilm Lilmalayin (House of Knowledge for Millions), which became one of the most important publishing houses in the Arab world. He gained wide recognition for authoring the Al-Mawrid English-Arabic dictionary, which became known as the "Sheikh of Dictionaries," and he himself was dubbed the "Sheikh of Arab Translators." Al-Baalbaki provided numerous important translations of world literature, including the novel Les Misérables. He was elected a member of the Arabic Language Academy in 1993. Al-Baalbaki died in June 1999 at the age of 81, after spending the last two years of his life in a coma.

== Life ==
Born in Beirut in 1918 to a tailor whose roots traced back to the city of Baalbek, from which his ancestors had migrated to Beirut, acquiring their surname.

He received his primary education in Al-Makassed Association schools, then moved to the International College. He attended the American University of Beirut, graduating in 1938 with a bachelor's degree in Arabic Literature and History. Although his specialization was not in English language and literature, he excelled in both fields, leading the university to appoint him as a professor. He later moved to Baghdad to teach at King Faisal College, followed by the National Scientific College in Damascus, and finally at Al-Makassed Philanthropic Islamic College in Beirut.

Al-Baalbaki married Rouhiya Haqqaq and had three children: Rouhi, Ramzi, and Sahar.

He authored the Al-Mawrid dictionary in 1967 and co-founded Dar El Ilm Lilmalayin in 1945 with his friend Bahij Othman after leaving teaching to focus on printing and publishing books. He retired from the publishing house upon his partner's death, leaving its management to his two sons, Rouhi and Sabri, and his partner's son, Taref. Munir also translated numerous English books into Arabic.

After the great success of the Al-Mawrid dictionary, he embarked on another ambitious project in 1967: authoring the Al-Mawrid Encyclopedia. This massive ten-volume work took thirteen years of meticulous research, writing, and editing to complete. Al-Baalbaki served as editor-in-chief of Al-Ulum (The Sciences) magazine between 1956 and 1972 and contributed to the founding of Al-Adab (The Arts) magazine, which later came under the management of Suhayl Idris. He co-authored the Al-Musawwar fi al-Tarikh (Illustrated History) series for preparatory and secondary school levels with his colleagues Shafiq Juha and Bahij Othman.

He fell into a coma in the autumn of 1997 and remained in this state for more than a year and a half until his death in June 1999.
