= Abderrahmane Hadj-Salah =

Algerian linguist

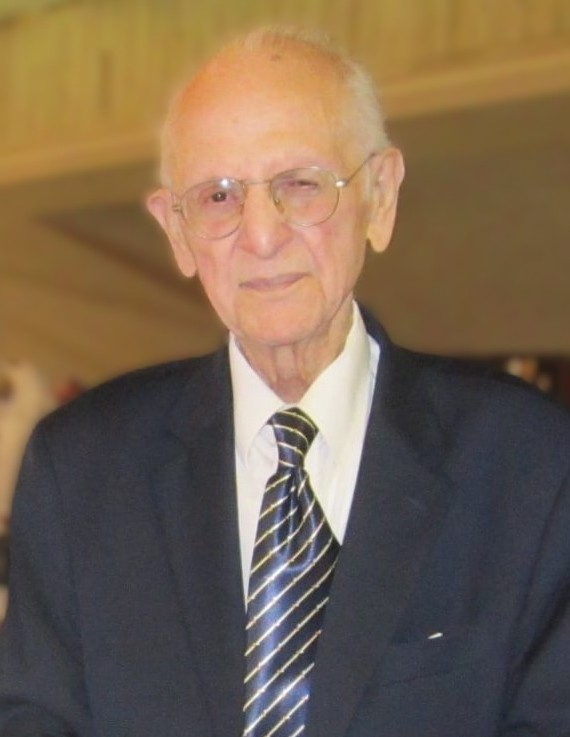
- Born: July 8, 1928; Oran, Algeria
- Died: 5 March 2017 (aged 88); Algiers, Algeria

Academic background
- Thesis: Linguistique arabe et linguistique générale : Essai de méthodologie et d'épistémologie du Ilm al- Arabiyya (1979)
- Doctoral advisor: Charles Pellat

Academic work
- Discipline: Linguistics
- Institutions: University of Algiers

Abderrahmane Hadj-Salah (Arabic: عبد الرحمن حاج صالح) was an Algerian linguist (8 July 1928 - 5 March 2017), popularly labelled the "father of linguistics" in Algeria.

== Life ==
Abderrahmane Hadj-Salah was born in Oran on 8 July 1928. He joined the anti-colonial Algerian People's Party at the age of 15, and soon afterward took refuge in Egypt, where he began studying the Arabic language at Al-Azhar University. He later studied at the University of Bordeaux, gaining a BA in Arabic language and literature (1958) and a Diplôme d'études supérieures in French philology. After obtaining an Agrégation Certificate in Language and Literature from the University of Paris (1961), he briefly worked as assistant professor at the College of Arts, Rabat University (Morocco).

Once Algeria became independent from France in 1962, Hadj-Salah joined the University of Algiers, where he would spend the remainder of his academic career. He was dean of the university from 1965 to 1968. During his university career, he also founded a journal of linguistics, Al-Lisaniyyat, and developed a master's program in linguistics.

== Linguistic theory and research ==
Abderrahmane Hadj-Salah analysed the grammatical theory of Al-Khalil ibn Ahmad al-Farahidi, and advocated a modern version of this theory which he called "neo-Khalilian", sometimes translated as "modern Khalilian". According to Hadj-Salah, this theory is distinguished from post-Saussurian structuralism notably by its use of qiyas (approximately: analogy) as a process of constructive abstraction, and from generative grammar by adopting a syntheticist viewpoint treating the syntagmatic and paradigmatic axes as two components of the same matrix.

== Reception and influence ==
In 2000, Abderrahmane Hadj-Salah was appointed Chairman of the Algerian Arabic Language Academy.

In 2010, he won the King Faisal Prize for Arabic Language and Literature.
