= Melvyn Greaves =

British cancer biologist

Professor Sir Melvyn Greaves FRS FMedSci
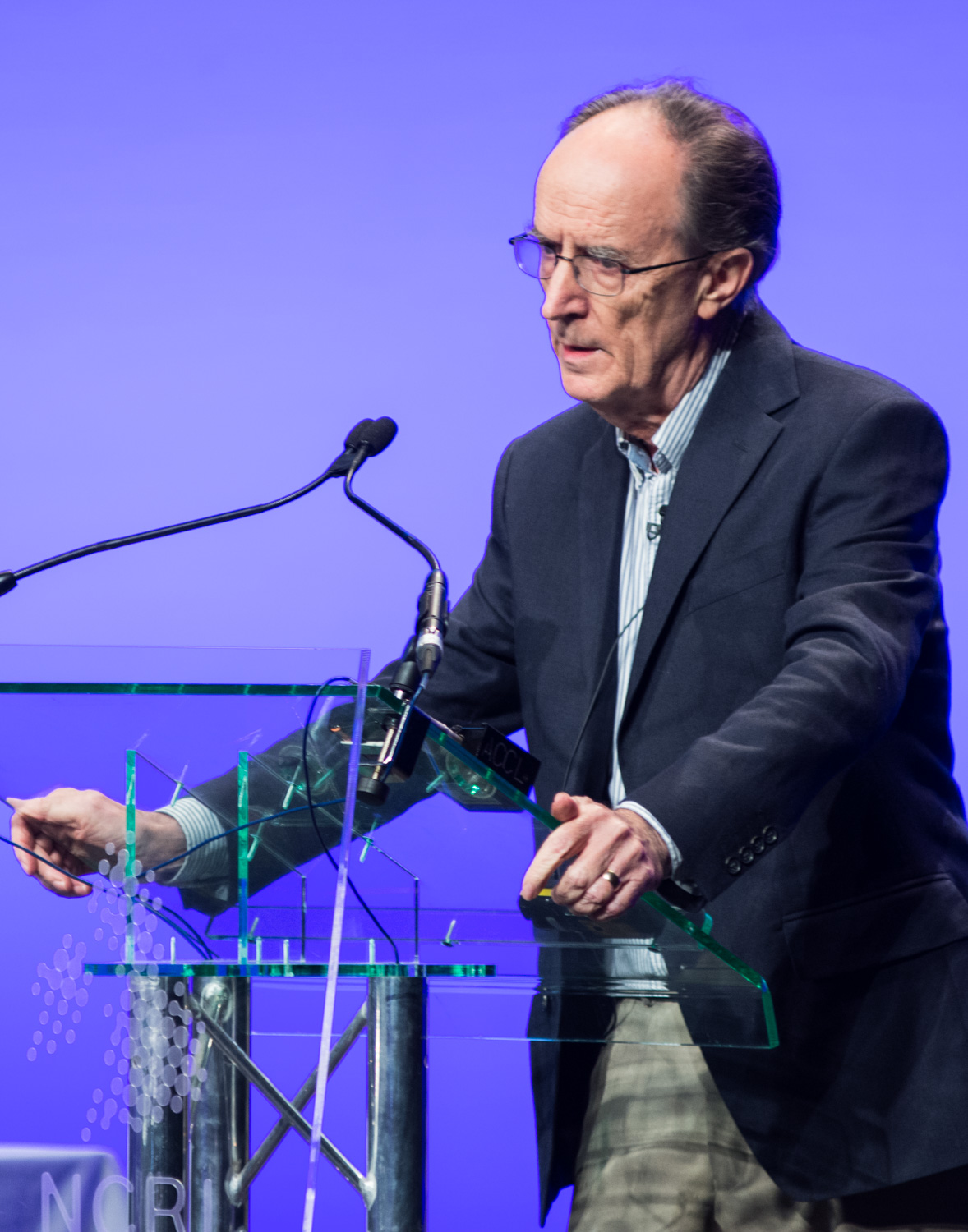
- Greaves delivering the Cancer Research UK Lifetime Achievement Prize lecture at the 2015 National Cancer Research Institute (NCRI) Conference
- Born: 12 September 1941 (age 84)
- Education: University College London
- Scientific career
- Workplaces: Imperial Cancer Research Fund; Institute of Cancer Research
- Website: www.icr.ac.uk/our-research/researchers-and-teams/professor-mel-greaves

Sir Melvyn Francis Greaves (born 12 September 1941) is a British cancer biologist, and Professor of Cell Biology at the Institute of Cancer Research (ICR) in London. He is noted for his research into childhood leukaemia and the roles of evolution in cancer, including important discoveries in the genetics and molecular biology underpinning leukaemia.

== Education ==
Greaves initially trained in zoology and immunology, earning a PhD degree in 1968 from University College London.

== Career and research ==
In the mid-1970s, his research turned to leukaemia, an interest he attributes to a tour of Great Ormond Street Hospital. He worked at the Imperial Cancer Research Fund laboratories at Lincoln's Inn Fields (now part of the Francis Crick Institute) before moving to the ICR in 1984. At the ICR he served as Director of the Leukaemia Research Fund's Centre for Cell and Molecular Biology of Leukaemia from 1984-2003, and launched the Centre for Cancer Evolution in 2013.

=== Selected publications ===
- Melvyn F. Greaves and Geoffrey Brown, "Purification of Human T and B Lymphocytes", The Journal of Immunology, January 1, 1974, vol. 112 no. 1 420-423
- Melvyn F. Greaves (ed) Monoclonal antibodies to receptors: probes for receptor structure and function, Chapman and Hall, 1984, ISBN 978-0-412-25330-0
- Edward S. Henderson, Thomas Andrew Lister, Melvyn F. Greaves (eds) Leukemia, Saunders, 1996, ISBN 978-0-7216-5381-5
- Melvyn F. Greaves (ed) Cancer: the evolutionary legacy , Oxford University Press, 2000, ISBN 0-19-262835-6

== Awards and honours ==
Greaves awards and honours include:

- 1986 Honorary MRCP Royal College of Physicians London).
- 1988 King Faisal Prize in medicine for his work on leukemia.
- 1999 Elected a Fellow of the Academy of Medical Sciences, UK (FMedSci).
- 1999 Gold Medal, British Society for Haematology.
- 2003 Elected Fellow of the Royal Society (FRS).
- 2015 Cancer Research UK Lifetime Achievement in Cancer Research Prize.
- 2017 Royal Medal of the Royal Society
- 2018 Knight Bachelor for services to Childhood Leukaemia Research, in the 2019 New Year Honours
