= Muhammad Rashad Salim =

Muḥammad Rashād Sālim (Arabic: محمد رشاد سالم) is an Egyptian born Saudi Arabian thinker, writer, and editor.

He was a recipient of 1971 The Egyptian State Prize for Islamic Philosophy and the Order of Sciences, Literature and Arts, and also 1985 King Faisal International Prize for Islamic Studies.

== Life and education ==
He was born in 1927 in Cairo, where he completed his general education and took a bachelor's degree in philosophy from Fuad Al-Awal University. He pursued higher education in the U.K. and obtained his Ph.D. in the Islamic Doctrine at Cambridge University. He taught for many years at Ain Shams University in Cairo, then traveled to Saudi Arabia where he taught at King Saud University, then at Imam Muhammad bin Saud Islamic University in Riyadh and was granted Saudi citizenship. He died in Cairo in 1986, while working on a new book.

== Work ==
Salim authored or edited a number of keynote books on Islamic doctrine, including his illustrious, 11-volume edition of Ibn Taymiyyah’s Dar Ta'arud al-'Aql wa al-Naql (Avoiding Clashes of Thought and Tradition), which remains one of the most influential texts on the Islamic doctrine. Most of his other editions were also focused on the thought and works of Ibn Taimiyya e.g., his editions of: The Path of the Prophet’s Sunna (8 volumes), Al-Safadiyya (2 volumes) and Righteousness (2 volumes).
