= Stephen Chanock =

American physician and geneticist

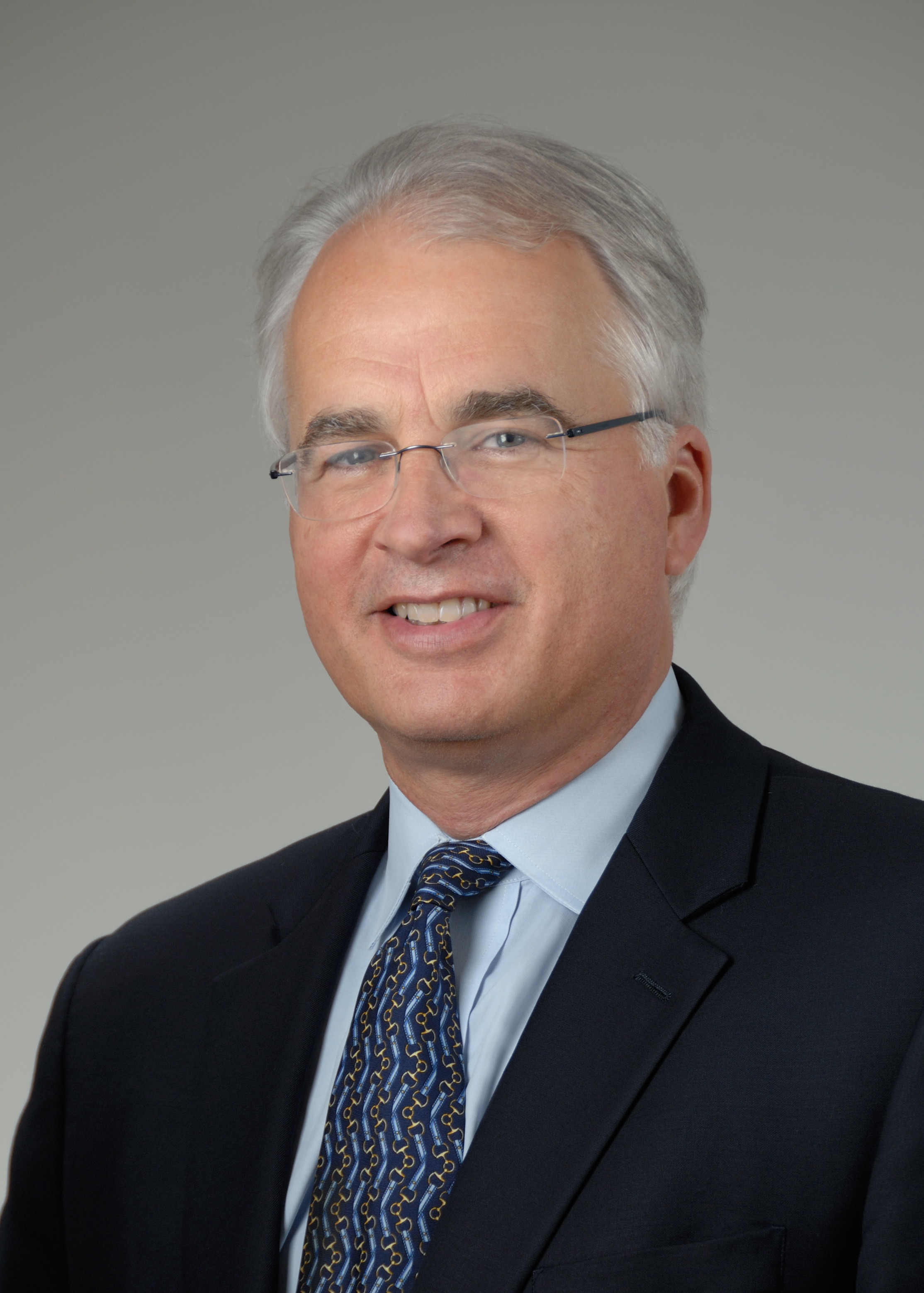
- Chanock in 2014
- Born: Stephen Jacob Chanock; April 15, 1956 (age 70)
- Education: Princeton University; Harvard University
- Occupations: Physician, geneticist
- Father: Robert M. Chanock

Stephen Jacob Chanock (born April 15, 1956) is an American physician and geneticist. He currently serves as Director of the Division of Cancer Epidemiology and Genetics at the U.S. National Cancer Institute (NCI).

== Biography ==
Stephen Chanock is the son of National Institutes of Health (NIH) scientist Robert M. Chanock, discoverer of human respiratory syncytial virus.

Chanock completed undergraduate studies at Princeton University in 1978, and his medical training at Harvard Medical School in 1983. He completed clinical training in pediatrics, pediatric infectious diseases, and pediatric hematology/oncology at Boston Children's Hospital and the Dana–Farber Cancer Institute, Boston, MA. He has held multiple positions, both in research and scientific leadership over his career at the NCI. He has received numerous awards for his work in the discovery and characterization of cancer susceptibility regions in the human genome. These include the Niehaus, Southorth, Weissenbach Award in Clinical Cancer Genetics and the NIH Directors Award. Chanock is an elected member of Association of American Physicians, the American Epidemiology Society, and the Society for Pediatric Research. He was elected a Fellow of the academy of the American Association of Cancer Research and a Fellow of the American Association for the Advancement of Science. In 2024, he was elected to the National Academy of Medicine. He is the author of over 1200 publications and two dozen of book chapters.

Chanock served as the medical director for Camp Fantastic, a week-long recreational camp for pediatric cancer patients for over 25 years.

== Research activities ==
Chanock co-leads several international consortial studies to identify and characterize the genetics of cancer susceptibility including BRCA Challenge, Game-On, and the NCI Cohort Consortium. His work focuses specifically on efforts to clarify the genetic architecture of cancer susceptibility, the scope of genetic mosaicism and its contribution to cancer risk, and how germline variation informs our understanding of somatic alterations in cancer and investigation of how ionizing radiation causes thyroid cancer in children exposed to the Chornobyl accident and the lack of evidence for a transgenerational effect in cleanup workers following the Chornobyl accident.

== Awards ==
- NIH Directors Award (2008, 2013, 2019, 2022)
- The Niehaus, Southorth, Weissenbach Award in Clinical Cancer Genetics, Memorial Sloan Kettering Cancer Center, New York, NY (2010)
- NCI Directors Award (2014, 2015, 2018, 2020, 2021, 2022)
- Society for Pediatric Research (elected 1998)
- Association of American Physicians (elected 2013)
- American Epidemiology Society (elected 2013)
- Randy Schools Light of Love Award, Special Love, Inc (2022)
- Fellow of the Academy of American Association of Cancer Research (2023)
- Member, National Academy of Medicine (2024)
