= Robert Purcell (virologist) =

American virologist

Robert Harry Purcell
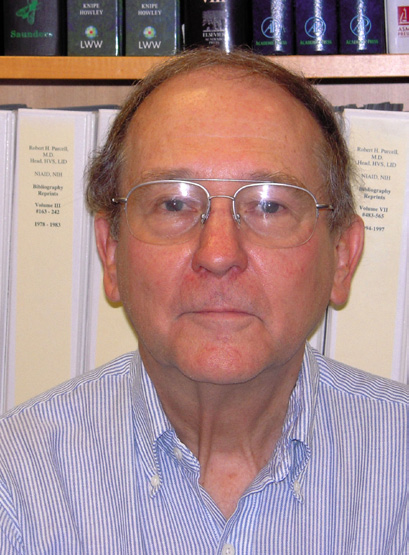
- Born: December 19, 1935 (age 90)

Academic background
- Education: Oklahoma State University; Baylor University; Duke University School of Medicine

Academic work
- Discipline: Virologist
- Sub-discipline: Hepatitis viruses
- Institutions: Laboratory of Infectious Diseases, National Institute of Allergy and Infectious Diseases

Robert Harry Purcell (born 19 December 1935 in Iowa, United States) is an American virologist and former co-chief of the Laboratory of Infectious Diseases at the U.S. National Institute of Allergy and Infectious Disease. He is known for his work on hepatitis viruses, and was involved in identifying hepatitis A virus, hepatitis D virus, and hepatitis E virus, developing an animal model for hepatitis B, and developing the hepatitis A vaccine.

== Education and career ==
Robert Purcell was born in 1935 in Keokuk, Iowa. He completed a bachelor's degree in Chemistry from Oklahoma State University in 1957 and a master's degree in biochemistry from Baylor University in 1960. He then on to medical training, completing his MD from Duke University in 1962, and an internship in Pediatrics at Duke University Hospital.

In 1963, Purcell joined the U.S. Epidemic Intelligence Service where he investigated respiratory viruses and mycoplasma. He then moved to the National Institute of Allergy and Infectious Diseases, where he rose to chief of the hepatitis viruses section of the Laboratory of Infectious Disease, and co-chief of the Laboratory of Infectious Disease with Brian R. Murphy. He retired from the National Institute of Allergy and Infectious Diseases in 2013.

Purcell was elected to the U.S. National Academy of Sciences in 1988. In 1998, he was granted the King Faisal Prize along with John L. Gerin for "Control of Communicable Diseases".

== Research ==
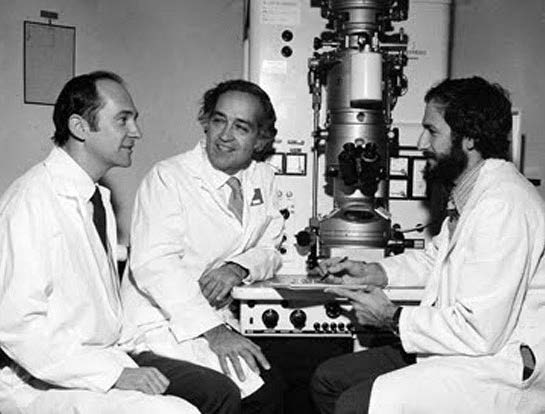
Robert Purcell, Albert Kapikian, and Stephen Feinstone around an electron microscope

Purcell is known for his extensive work on hepatitis viruses. In 1972, he was involved in the group that developed the first animal model for hepatitis B. In 1973, Purcell, Albert Kapikian, and Stephen Feinstone discovered and characterized hepatitis A virus. In 1978, Purcell showed that hepatitis C virus is transmissible through blood, and that it remains in the body for life. In the early 1980s, Purcell's group discovered a fourth hepatitis virus, hepatitis D virus. In the 1990s, they discovered Hepatitis E virus. Purcell also helped to develop the first licensed vaccine against hepatitis A virus, and was also involved in developing a vaccine against hepatitis B and D viruses, and a vaccine candidate for protection from hepatitis E virus.

The same team who co-identified the Hepatitis A virus (HAV) developed the first assays that could measure the virus antigen and antibody, and using those assays, the group along with Harvey J. Alter demonstrated through the serologic exclusion of Hepatitis A and Hepatitis B that a third, previously unrecognised form of viral hepatitis existed, originally named non-A, non-B hepatitis (NANBH). Michael Houghton's laboratory at Chiron Corporation ultimately identified the agent associated with NANBH, now known as Hepatitis C, in 1989.

== Notable publications ==
- Farci T, Shimoda A... Purcell RH (1996). Prevention of hepatitis C virus infection in chimpanzees by hyperimmune serum against the hypervariable region 1 of the envelope 2 protein. Proceedings of the National Academy of Sciences. 93(26): pgs. 15394-15399
- Farci P, Alter HJ... Purcell RH (1992). Lack of protective immunity against reinfection with hepatitis C virus. Science. 258(5079): pgs. 135-140
- Ogata N, Alter HJ... Purcell RH (1991). Nucleotide sequence and mutation rate of the H strain of hepatitis C virus. Proceedings of the National Academy of Sciences. 88(8): pgs. 3392-3396
- Farci P, Alter HJ... Purcell RH (1991). A long-term study of hepatitis C virus replication in non-A, non-B hepatitis. New England Journal of Medicine. 325(2): pgs. 98-104
- Miller RH, Purcell RH (1990). Hepatitis C virus shares amino acid sequence similarity with pestiviruses and flaviviruses as well as members of two plant virus supergroups. Proceedings of the National Academy of Sciences. 87(6): pgs. 2057-2061
- Feinstone SM, Kapikian AZ, Purcell RH (1973). Hepatitis A: detection by immune electron microscopy of a viruslike antigen associated with illness. Science. 182(4116): pgs. 1026-1028
