= Johanne Martel-Pelletier =

Canadian pharmacologist

Johanne Martel-Pelletier (born April 20, 1952) is a Canadian pharmacologist living and working in Quebec. She studies the pathophysiology and molecular mechanisms of arthritis.

She was born in Saint-Jean-sur-Richelieu. She earned a master's degree and doctorate in physiology from the University of Montreal. She continued with post-graduate studies in biophysics at the University of Montreal and in rheumatology at the University of Miami. In 1981, she was named assistant professor of medicine at the University of Montreal; in 1995, she became a full professor.

In 1981, she co-founded the Osteoarthritis Research Unit at the Hôpital Notre-Dame of the Centre hospitalier de l'Université de Montréal and has served as that unit's co-director.

In 2010, she was awarded the King Faisal International Prize in medicine together with Reinhold Ganz and her husband and colleague Jean-Pierre Pelletier. She has also been awarded a number of prizes including the International League of Associations of Rheumatology Prize, the Carol-Nachman Prize for Rheumatology and the European League Against Rheumatism Scientific Award for Basic Research in Osteoarthritis.
