= William B. Greenough III =

American physician (born 1932)

- Born: January 3, 1932 (age 94); Providence, Rhode Island, U.S.
- Education: Harvard Medical School (MD)
- Occupation: physician
- Known for: diarrheal disease

William Bates Greenough III (born January 3, 1932) is an American physician. He is a specialist in the treatment of diarrheal diseases such as cholera in the developing world. From 1986 to 1994, he was President of the International Child Health Foundation, which he co-founded. He is a fellow of the American College of Physicians and the American Association for the Advancement of Science.

== Early life ==
Greenough was born on January 3, 1932, in Providence, Rhode Island. He attended Harvard Medical School, receiving an M.D.

== Career ==
He is a specialist in the treatment of diarrheal diseases such as cholera in the developing world. From 1986 to 1994, he was President of the International Child Health Foundation, which he co-founded. He is a fellow of the American College of Physicians and the American Association for the Advancement of Science.

== Awards ==
In 1984, Greenough was awarded the King Faisal International Prize in Medicine for research on diarrhea with John S. Fordtran and Michael Field. For his services to children, UNICEF awarded him the Gold Medal for East Asia and Pakistan in 1983 and the Maurice Pate Prize in 1984. He was named the 2001 Howard Florey Memorial Lecturer at the University of Adelaide as well as the 2006 Paul G. Rogers Society Ambassador for Global Health Research.

In 2007, he received the Outstanding Service Award from the Bangladesh American Foundation, Inc. In 2012, Greenough was awarded the Friends of Liberation War Honor Award by the prime minister and president of Bangladesh. He received the Mary Betty Stevens Award for Excellence in Clinical Investigation prize from the American College of Physicians in 2012, and the Arnold P. Gold Foundation Humanism in Medicine Award from the American Geriatric Society in 2014.
