= Suzanne Stetkevych =

Professor of Arabic and Islamic Studies

Suzanne Pinckney Stetkevych (born 1950) is a scholar of classical Arabic poetry and the Sultan Qaboos bin Said Professor of Arabic and Islamic Studies at Georgetown University.

== Biography ==
Suzanne Pinckney Stetkevych earned a BA in Art History from Wellesley College in 1972 and a PhD in Classical Arabic Literature from the University of Chicago in 1981. She taught Arabic literature at Indiana University, Bloomington, from 1986 to 2013, before taking a permanent position as Sultan Qaboos bin Said Professor of Arabic and Islamic studies at Georgetown University. The King Faisal Foundation awarded her the 2022 King Faisal Prize for her contributions to Arabic language and literature.

== Works ==
- Stetkevych, Suzanne Pinckney (1991). Abū Tammām and the Poetics of the ‘Abbāsid Age. Brill.
- Stetkevych, Suzanne Pinckney (1993). The Mute Immortals Speak: Pre-Islamic Poetry and the Poetics of Ritual. Cornell University Press. ISBN 978-0801480461.
- Stetkevych, Suzanne Pinckney (2002). The Poetics of Islamic Legitimacy: Myth, Gender, and Ceremony in the Classical Arabic Ode. Indiana University Press.
- Stetkevych, Suzanne Pinckney (2010). "From Jāhiliyyah to Badīciyyah: Orality, Literacy, and the Transformations of Rhetoric in Arabic Poetry". Center for Studies in Oral Tradition. 25 (1): 211–230.
- Stetkevych, Suzanne Pinckney (2010). The Mantle Odes: Arabic Praise Poems to the Prophet Muhammad. Indiana University Press.
- Stetkevych, Suzanne Pinckney (2017). "Solomon and Mythic Kingship in the Arab-Islamic Tradition: Qaṣīdah, Qurʾān and Qiṣaṣ al-anbiyāʾ". Journal of Arabic Literature. 48: 1–37.
- Stetkevych, Suzanne Pinckney (2022). The Cooing of the Dove and the Cawing of the Crow: Late ʿAbbāsid Poetics in Abū al-ʿAlāʾ al-Maʿarrī’s Saqṭ al-Zand and Luzūm Mā Lā Yalzam. Brill.
