= John L. Gerin =

American virologist (born 1937)

John Louis Gerin (born 28 September 1937) is an American virologist who has worked on hepatitis viruses, and made important contributions to the discovery of the Hepatitis D genome in 1986.

He obtained a bachelor's degree from Georgetown University in 1959 and an MSc and PhD from the University of Tennessee in 1961 and 1964 respectively.

In 1998, he was granted the King Faisal Prize along with Robert Purcell for "Control of Communicable Diseases".
