= King Faisal Prize =

- Awarded for: Service to Islam; Islamic studies; Arabic Language and Literature; Medicine; Science
- Country: Saudi Arabia
- Presented by: King Faisal Foundation
- Rewards: A certificate, A 24-carat gold medal, A check of SR 750 thousand (an equivalent of US$ 200 thousand)
- First award: 1979
- Website: kingfaisalprize.org

The King Faisal Prize (Arabic: جائزة الملك فيصل, formerly King Faisal International Prize), is an annual award sponsored by King Faisal Foundation presented to "dedicated men and women whose contributions make a positive difference". The foundation awards prizes in five categories: Service to Islam; Islamic studies; the Arabic language and Arabic literature; science; and medicine.

The first King Faisal Prize was awarded to the Pakistani scholar Abul A'la Maududi in 1979 for his service to Islam. In 1981, Khalid of Saudi Arabia received the same award. In 1984, Fahd of Saudi Arabia was the recipient of the award. In 1986, this prize was co-awarded to Ahmed Deedat and French Roger Garaudy.

The King Faisal Award 2026 for Service to Islam announced on April 15, 2026 was jointly conferred on Sheikh Abdullatif Ahmed Alfozan of Saudi Arabia and Professor Mohamed Mohamed Aboumousa of Egypt.

== Award process ==
=== Designation of subjects ===
Each year, the selection committees designate subjects in Islamic Studies, Arabic Literature, and Medicine. Selected topics in Islamic Studies category are aimed at highlighting areas of importance in Muslim societies. Arabic Literature topics relate to specialized areas within the discipline. Topics in medicine are supposed to reflect current areas of international concern. The science category covers a broad range of subcategories e.g. physics, mathematics, chemistry and biology.

=== Nomination ===
Islamic institutions, universities and previous winners of the King Faisal Prize can nominate a person for the award. Nominations from ordinary individuals or political parties are not accepted. The nominee or nominated institution(s) must be known for their leading practical or intellectual role in the service of Islam and Muslims. Nominated works must be published, benefit mankind and enrich human knowledge.

=== Selection ===
Winners of the Prize for category "Service to Islam" are chosen directly by the respective selection committee. For other Prize categories, pre-selection by peer reviewers is carried out, which is followed by scrutiny of the works of worthy nominees by selected referees of each discipline. Autonomous, international, specialist selection committees are then convened at the headquarters of King Faisal Foundation in Riyadh each January to make their final decisions.

== Prizes ==
The prize in each of the five categories consists of:

1. A Certificate written in Arabic Diwani calligraphy and signed by the Chairman of the Prize board, His Royal Highness Prince Khalid Al-Faisal Bin Abd Al-Aziz, enclosed in a binder of the finest leather inscribed with the winner’s name and a summary of his/her work which qualified him/her for the prize.
2. A 24 carat 200 gram gold medal, with one side bearing the image of King Faisal, and the prize category written in Arabic, and the other holding the logo of the prize and the prize category in English.
3. A check of SAR 750 thousand (an equivalent of US$ 200 thousand), distributed equally between the winners if they are more than one.

Co-winners in any category share the monetary grant. The prizes are awarded during a ceremony in Riyadh, Saudi Arabia, under the auspices of the King of Saudi Arabia.

== Country standings ==
The five countries with most award-winners including 2026 were:

Position	Service to Islam	Islamic Studies	Arabic Language and Literature	Medicine	Science	Total
United States	0	1	3	32	29	65
Egypt	8	8	23	0	2	41
Saudi Arabia	18	9	3	0	0	30
United Kingdom	0	2	0	13	13	28
Germany	0	1	0	3	6	10

Sydney Brenner was considered to be the first Jew to win the King Faisal Award, in 1992. Ronald Levy was reported to be a Jewish recipient in 2009.

== Winners by subject ==
=== Service to Islam ===
Year	Branch	Country	Winner name	Winner title
1979	Service to Islam	Pakistan	Sayyid Abul Ala'a AI-Moudoodi	Maulana
1980	Service to Islam	India	Sayyid Abul-Hasan Ali Al-Hasani Al-Nadawi	Mufakkir-e-Islam
1980	Service to Islam	Indonesia	Mohammad Natsir	Doctor
1981	Service to Islam	Saudi Arabia	King Khalid bin Abdulaziz Al Saud	His Majesty
1982	Service to Islam	Saudi Arabia	Abdulaziz bin Baz	Shaikh
1983	Service to Islam	Egypt	Hasanein M. Makhlouf	Shaikh
1983	Service to Islam	Malaysia	Tunku Abdul Rahman	Prince
1984	Service to Islam	Saudi Arabia	King Fahd bin Abdulaziz Al Saud	Custodian of the Two Holy Mosques
1985	Service to Islam	Afghanistan	Abdul Rasul Sayyaf	Mr
1986	Service to Islam	South Africa	Ahmad H. Deedat	Mr
1986	Service to Islam	France	Roger Garaudy	Doctor
1987	Service to Islam	Nigeria	Abu Bakr Mahmoud Gumi	Shaikh
1988	Service to Islam	Philippines	Ahmad Domocao Alonto	Doctor
1989	Service to Islam	Egypt	Muhammad Al-Ghazali Al-Saqqa	Shaikh
1990	Service to Islam	Syria	Ali Al-Tantawi	Shaikh
1990	Service to Islam	Pakistan	Khurshid Ahmad	Professor
1991	Service to Islam	Saudi Arabia	Dr. Abdullah Umar Nasif	His Excellency
1992	Service to Islam	Niger	Dr. Hamid AIgabid	His Excellency
1993	Service to Islam	Bosnia	President Alija Begovitch	President
1994	Service to Islam	Saudi Arabia	Muhammad Ibn Al-Uthaymeen	Shaikh
1995	Service to Islam	Egypt	Shaikh Gad AI-Haq Ali Gad AI-Haq	His Eminence
1996	Service to Islam	Kuwait	Abd AI-Rahman H. AI-Sumait	Doctor
1997	Service to Islam	Malaysia	Dr. Mahathir bin Muhammad	Prime Minister
1998	Service to Islam	Senegal	President Abdou Diouf	His Excellency
1999	Service to Islam	United Arab Emirates	Jum'ah AI-Majid Abd Allah	Mr
2000	Service to Islam	Egypt	AI-Azhar AI-Sharif	-
2001	Service to Islam	Saudi Arabia	The Saudi Arabian High Commission for Donations to Bosnia-Herzegovina	-
2002	Service to Islam	United Arab Emirates	Shaikh Dr. Sultan bin Muhammad Al Qasimi	His Highness
2003	Service to Islam	Saudi Arabia	Sultan bin Abdulaziz Al Saud Foundation	-
2004	Service to Islam	Sudan	Abd ar-Rahman Muhammad Siwar Adh-Dahab	Field Marshal
2005	Service to Islam	Saudi Arabia	Ahmed Mohamed Ali	His Excellency
2005	Service to Islam	Lebanon	AI-Hariri Foundation	-
2006	Service to Islam	Saudi Arabia	Shaikh Salih bin Abd AlRahman AI-Husayyin	His Excellency
2006	Service to Islam	Kuwait	Yusuf bin Jasim bin Mohammad AI-Hidji	Shaikh
2007	Service to Islam	Russia	Mintimer Sharipovich Shaimev	His Excellency
2008	Service to Islam	Saudi Arabia	King Abdullah bin Abdulaziz Al Saud	Custodian of the Two Holy Mosques
2009	Service to Islam	Egypt	Principal Sharie Society for Quran and Sunnah Scholars Cairo	-
2010	Service to Islam	Turkey	Recep Tayyip Erdoğan	Prime Minister
2011	Service to Islam	Malaysia	Abdullah Ahmad Badawi	His Excellency
2012	Service to Islam	Saudi Arabia	Sulaiman Bin Abd Al-Aziz Al-Rajhi	Shaikh
2014	Service to Islam	Nigeria	Ahmed Lemu	Sheikh, Justice
2015	Service to Islam	India	Zakir A. Naik	Doctor
2016	Service to Islam	Saudi Arabia	Salih bin Abdullah al Humaid	Doctor
2017	Service to Islam	Saudi Arabia	Salman bin Abdulaziz	King
2018	Service to Islam	Indonesia	Irwandi Jaswir	Professor
2019	Service to Islam	Sudan	International University of Africa, Khartoum	-
2020	Service to Islam	Saudi Arabia	The Makkah Document	-
2021	Service to Islam	Kuwait	Mohammed Al-Sharekh	Mr
2022	Service to Islam	Tanzania	Ali Hassan Mwinyi	His Excellency
2022	Service to Islam	Egypt	Hassan Mahmoud Al Shafei	Professor
2023	Service to Islam	South Korea	Choi Young Kil-Hamed	Professor
2023	Service to Islam	United Arab Emirates	Nasser bin Abdullah Al Zaabi	His Excellency
2024	Service to Islam	Japan	Japan Muslim Association	-
2024	Service to Islam	Lebanon	Mohammad Sammak	Doctor
2025	Service to Islam	Saudi Arabia	Liajlehum Association for Serving People with Disabilities	-
2025	Service to Islam	Saudi Arabia	Sami Abdullah Almaghlouth	-
2026	Service to Islam	Saudi Arabia	Abdullatif Ahmed Alfozan	Sheikh
2026	Service to Islam	Egypt	Mohamed Mohamed Aboumousa	Professor

=== Islamic studies ===
Year	Branch	Topic	Country	Winner name	Winner title
1979	Islamic studies	Studies dealing with the influence of Muslim scholars on European civilization	Germany	Fuat Sezgin	Professor
1980	Islamic studies	Studies on the hadith of Muhammad	Saudi Arabia	Muhammad Mustafa Azmi	Doctor
1981	Islamic studies	Studies on the role of Shari'a in the restoration of the society	-	Not awarded	-----
1982	Islamic studies	Contemporary economic problems from an Islamic perspective	India	Muhammad Najatuallah Siddiqui	Professor
1983	Islamic studies	Studies on the Quran	Egypt	Muhammad A. Odaimah	Professor
1984	Islamic studies	General theory in Islamic jurisprudence	Syria	Mustafa A. AI-Zarka'a	Shaikh
1985	Islamic studies	Studies and editions on the Islamic doctrine	Saudi Arabia	Muhammad Rashad Salim	Professor
1985	Islamic studies	Studies and editions on the Islamic doctrine	Egypt	Farouk A Oesouki	Doctor
1985	Islamic studies	Studies and editions on the Islamic doctrine	Egypt	Mustafa M. Suliman	Doctor
1986	Islamic studies	Studies dealing with Islamic history	Iraq	Abd AI-Aziz AI-Duri	Professor
1987	Islamic studies	Principles and practices of international relations in Islam	-	Not awarded	-
1988	Islamic studies	Studies dealing with Islamic education	Egypt	Muhammad Kotb Shathly	-
1988	Islamic studies	Studies dealing with Islamic education	Turkey	Mikdat Yalçın	Professor
1989	Islamic studies	Studies dealing with the Islamic city	Iraq	Saleh Ahmad AI-Ali	Professor
1990	Islamic studies	Financial dealings in Islamic Shari'ah	Sudan	Al-Seddiq M. Al-Darir	Professor
1990	Islamic studies	Financial dealings in Islamic Shari'ah	Saudi Arabia	Umer Chapra	Doctor
1991	Islamic studies	Studies dealing with the spread of Islam into an area outside the present boundaries of the Islamic World	-	Not awarded	-
1992	Islamic studies	Origins of research methodologies in contemporary	-	Not awarded	-
1993	Islamic studies	Muslim achievements in the field of sociology	Egypt	Hasan As-Sa'ati Abd AI Aziz	Professor
1994	Islamic studies	Studies dealing with Islamic law	Egypt	EI-Sayyid Sabiq At-Tihami	Shaikh
1994	Islamic studies	Studies dealing with Islamic law	Qatar	Yousef A. AI-Qaradawi	Doctor
1995	Islamic studies	Studies dealing with thematic commentary of the Quran	-	Not awarded	-
1996	Islamic studies	The life of Muhammad	Iraq	Akram Dia'a Al-Umari	Professor
1997	Islamic studies	Studies on the status of women in Islam	Iraq	Abd AI-Karim Zedan Biej	Professor
1998	Islamic studies	Studies on libraries or the evolution of Islamic book craft	Egypt	Abd AI-Sattar Al-Halwaji	Professor
1998	Islamic studies	Studies on libraries or the evolution of Islamic book craft	Saudi Arabia	Yahia M. bin Junaid	Professor
1999	Islamic studies	Contributions to the study, verification and authentication of the hadith	Albania	Shaikh Muhammad Nasir Ad-Din Al-Albani	Shaikh
2000	Islamic studies	Studies dealing with the spread and cultural impact of Islam outside the Arab	Bangladesh	Muhammad Mohar Ali	Professor
2001	Islamic studies	Studies on matters with no Islamic legal precedent	-	Not awarded	-
2002	Islamic studies	Studies into the objectives of Islamic legislation	-	Not awarded	-
2003	Islamic studies	Studies dealing with history of Islamic economics	Sudan	Izz EI-Din Omar Mousa	Professor
2003	Islamic studies	Studies dealing with history of Islamic economics	Morocco	Ibrahim Abu Bakr Harakat	Professor
2004	Islamic studies	Basics of Islamic jurisprudence	Saudi Arabia	Yacoub Abd AI-wahab AIBahussain	Doctor
2004	Islamic studies	Basics of Islamic jurisprudence	India	Ali Ahmad Ghulam Muhammad Nadvi	Doctor
2005	Islamic studies	Defense of the Islamic state during the 5th and 6th centuries A.H	United Kingdom	Carole Hillenbrand	Professor
2006	Islamic studies	The origins of Islamic jurisprudence	-	Not awarded	
2007	Islamic studies	Muslims' contribution to pure or applied sciences	France	Roshdi Hifni Rashed	Professor
2008	Islamic studies	Rules governing international relations during peace and war in Islam	-	Withheld	-
2009	Islamic studies	Studies by Muslim scholars on the concept of "imran" (civilization cycles)	Morocco	Abdessalam M. Cheddadi	Professor
2010	Islamic studies	Studies dealing with religious endowments (Waqf) in Islam	-	Withheld	-
2011	Islamic studies	Socioeconomic aspects in the Islamic world through 10th–13th century H;	Turkey	Halil İbrahim İnalcık	Professor
2011	Islamic studies	Socioeconomic aspects in the Islamic world through 10th–13th century H;	Jordan	Muhammad Adnan Bakhit Al-Sheyyab	Professor
2012	Islamic studies	Human rights in Islam	Saudi Arabia	Professor Adnaan Bin Muhammad Al-Wazan	His Excellency
2015	Islamic studies	Cultural heritage of Al-Madinah al-Munawwarah	Saudi Arabia	Abdulaziz Bin Abdulrahman Kaki	Doctor
2016	Islamic studies	Muslim geography heritage	Kuwait	Abdullah bin Yousif Al-Ghunaim	Professor
2018	Islamic studies	Critical editions of Islamic historical and biographical texts	Jordan	Bashar Awad	Professor
2020	Islamic studies	Islamic heritage of Alquds	Jordan	Mohammed Hashim Ghosheh	Doctor
2021	Islamic studies	Endowment in Islam	-	Withheld	-
2022	Islamic studies	Andalus's Islamic heritage	-	Withheld	-
2023	Islamic studies	Islamic architecture	United Kingdom	Robert Hillenbrand	Professor
2024	Islamic studies	Islamic Legislations and their Contemporary Applications	United States	Wael Hallaq	Professor
2025	Islamic studies	Studies of Archaeology in the Arabian Peninsula	Jordan	Said Faiz Alsaid	-
2025	Islamic studies	Studies of Archaeology in the Arabian Peninsula	Saudi Arabia	Saad Abdulaziz Alrashid	Professor
2026	Islamic studies	Trade Routes in the Islamic World	Jordan	Moh'd Wahib Hussein	Professor
2026	Islamic studies	Trade Routes in the Islamic World	Egypt	Abdelhamid Hussein Hammouda	Professor

=== Arabic language and literature ===
Year	Branch	Topic	Country	Winner name	Winner title
1979	Arabic language and literature	Studies on contemporary Arabic poetry	-	Not awarded	-
1980	Arabic language and literature	Studies on contemporary Arabic poetry	Palestine	Ihsan Abbas	Professor
1980	Arabic language and literature	Studies on contemporary Arabic poetry	Egypt	Abd Al-Qadir Al-Qit	Professor
1981	Arabic language and literature	Editing literary manuscripts from the 2nd and 3rd centuries A.H.	Egypt	Abd Al Salam Harun	Professor
1982	Arabic language and literature	Studies on ancient Arabic literature from the pre-Islamic era to the end of the 1st century A.H.	Jordan	Nasir Al-Din Al-Asad	Professor
1983	Arabic language and literature	Studies on ancient Arabic literature during the 2nd and 3rd centuries	Egypt	Ahmad Shawqi Daif	Professor
1984	Arabic language and literature	Studies on Arabic literature during the 4th century A.H.	Egypt	Mahmoud Mohamed Shaker	-
1985	Arabic language and literature	Studies on ancient Arabic literary criticism	-	Not awarded	-
1986	Arabic language and literature	Studies on Arabic literature during the 5th and 6th centuries A.H.	Iraq	Muhammad Bahjat Athari	-
1987	Arabic language and literature	Literary studies on modern Arabic prose	-	Not awarded	-
1988	Arabic language and literature	Studies on Arabic literature in Andalusia	Morocco	Mohammad Bin Sharifah	Professor
1988	Arabic language and literature	Studies on Arabic literature in Andalusia	Egypt	Mahmoud Y. Makki	Professor
1989	Arabic language and literature	Studies dealing with prominent Arab writers and poets to the end of the 3rd century A.H.	Egypt	Yousef A. Khulaif	Professor
1989	Arabic language and literature	Studies dealing with prominent Arab writers and poets to the end of the 3rd century A.H.	Syria	Shaker Al-Fahham	Professor
1990	Arabic language and literature	Short Novels	Egypt	Yahia M. Haqqi	Mr
1991	Arabic language and literature	Children's Literature	Morocco	MAli Abd Al-Qadir Al Siqilli	Mr
1991	Arabic language and literature	Children's Literature	Egypt	Abd Al Tawwab Yousef	Mr
1991	Arabic language and literature	Children's Literature	Egypt	Ahmed M. Najeeb	-
1992	Arabic language and literature	Translations of literary and critical studies into Arabic	Lebanon	Mohammad Yousef Najm	Professor
1992	Arabic language and literature	Translations of literary and critical studies into Arabic	Egypt	Abd Alfattah Shukri Ayyad	Professor
1992	Arabic language and literature	Translations of literary and critical studies into Arabic	Egypt	Mohammad Mustafa Badawi	Professor
1993	Arabic language and literature	Plays written in metrical or prose Arabic	-	Not awarded	-
1994	Arabic language and literature	Studies dealing with ancient Arabic prose	United States	Wadad Afif Kadi	Professor
1994	Arabic language and literature	Studies dealing with ancient Arabic prose	Egypt	Aisha Abd Al Rahman "Bint ash shati"	Professor
1995	Arabic language and literature	Studies dealing with prominent contemporary Arab writers	Egypt	Mohammad Abu Al-Anwar Mohammad Ali	Professor
1995	Arabic language and literature	Studies dealing with prominent contemporary Arab writers	Egypt	Hamdi Sayyid Ahmed El Sakkout	Professor
1995	Arabic language and literature	Studies dealing with prominent contemporary Arab writers	Syria	Salma Lutfi Al-Haffar Al-Kowzbari	-
1996	Arabic language and literature	Literature analyzing the writings of early Arab travelers	Saudi Arabia	Hamad Bin Mohamad Al Jasir	Shaikh
1997	Arabic language and literature	Studies on the modern Arabic novel	-	Not awarded	-
1998	Arabic language and literature	Autobiographies by contemporary Arab writers	-	Not awarded	-
1999	Arabic language and literature	Comparative studies between Arabic and other literatures: theoretical and applied aspects	Morocco	Said Abd Al-Salam Allouche	-
1999	Arabic language and literature	Comparative studies between Arabic and other literatures: theoretical and applied aspects	Egypt	Makarim Ahmed Al-Ghamri	Professor
2000	Arabic language and literature	Studies pertaining to early Arab literary critics	Egypt	Izz Ad-Din Ismail Abd-Al Ghani	Professor
2000	Arabic language and literature	Studies pertaining to early Arab literary critics	Sudan	Abd Allah Al-Tayyeb	-
2001	Arabic language and literature	Studies dealing with modern Arabic prose	Saudi Arabia	Mansour Ibrahim Al Hazmi	Professor
2001	Arabic language and literature	Studies dealing with modern Arabic prose	Jordan	Ibrahim Abd Al-Rahim Al Saafin	Professor
2002	Arabic language and literature	Studies of modern Palestinian literature	Jordan	Husni Mahmoud Hussein	Professor
2002	Arabic language and literature	Studies of modern Palestinian literature	Syria	Husam Aldin Al-Khatib	Professor
2003	Arabic language and literature	Definitions of literary and critical terms of Arabic literature	-	Not awarded	-
2004		Preservation of classical Arabic to the end of the 5th century AH	Egypt	Hussain M Nassar	Professor
2005	Arabic language and literature	Arabic prose in the 4th and 5th centuries A.H.	-	Not awarded	-
2006	Arabic language and literature	The Arabic language in modern linguistics	Morocco	Abdelkader Fassi Fehri	-
2006	Arabic language and literature	The Arabic language in modern linguistics	Egypt	Tammam Hassan Omar	Professor
2007	Arabic language and literature	Studies on ancient Arabic rhetoric	Egypt	Mustafa A. Nasif	Professor
2007	Arabic language and literature	Studies on ancient Arabic rhetoric	Morocco	Muhammad A. Al-Omari	Professor
2008	Arabic language and literature	Terminology Issues of the Arabic language	Tunisia	Muhammad Rachad Hamzaoui	Professor
2008	Arabic language and literature	Terminology Issues of the Arabic language	Iraq	Ahmed Matloob Al-Nasir	Professor
2009	Arabic language and literature	Verification of poetry, prose and anthology through 300 H – 700 H	Saudi Arabia	Abd Al-Aziz Bin Nasir Al-Manie	Professor
2010	Arabic language and literature	Studies Dealing with Arabic Grammatical Thought	Lebanon	Ramzi Mounir Baalbaki	Professor
2010	Arabic language and literature	Studies Dealing with Arabic Grammatical Thought	Algeria	Abderrahman El-Houari Hadj-Saleh	Professor
2011	Arabic language and literature	Renovation trends in Arabic poetry up to the end of the 7th century H.	-	Not awarded	-
2012	Arabic language and literature	Computer processing of the Arabic language: individual and institutional endeavors	Egypt	Nabil Ali Mohamed	Professor
2012	Arabic language and literature	Computer processing of the Arabic language: individual and institutional endeavors	Egypt	Ali Helmy Ahmed Moussa	Professor
2013	Arabic language and literature	Individual and institutional efforts In writing Arabic dictionaries	Egypt	Arabic language Academy In Cairo	-
2015	Arabic language and literature	Venture towards Arabisation of scientific and medical matters	-	Withheld	-
2016	Arabic language and literature	Analysis of the Arabic poetic text	Egypt	Mohamed Abdalmotaleb Mostafa	Professor
2016	Arabic language and literature	Analysis of the Arabic poetic text	Morocco	Mohammed El-Ghazouani Miftah	Professor
2018	Arabic language and literature	Studies dealing with autobiography in Arabic literature	Tunisia	Shukri Mabkhout	Professor
2019	Arabic language and literature	Arabic language and contemporary challenges	Morocco	Abdelali Mohamed Oudrhiri	Doctor
2019	Arabic language and literature	Arabic language and contemporary challenges	Egypt	Mahmoud Fahmy Hegazi	Doctor
2020	Arabic language and literature	Linguistic studies on Arabic in other languages	Australia	Michael G. Carter	Professor
2021	Arabic language and literature	The new rhetoric	Morocco	Mohamed Mechbal	Professor
2022	Arabic language and literature	Arabic literature studies in English	United States	Suzanne Stetkevych	Professor
2022	Arabic language and literature	Arabic literature studies in English	United States	Muhsin Al-Musawi	Professor
2023	Arabic language and literature	Classical Arabic narrative and modern theories	Morocco	Abdelfattah Kilito	Professor
2024	Arabic language and literature	Non-Arab Institutions and their Endeavors to Promote Arabic	-	Withheld	-
2025	Arabic language and literature	Studies of Identity in Arabic Literature	-	Withheld	-
2026	Arabic language and literature	Arabic literature in French	France	Pierre Larcher	Professor

=== Medicine ===
Year	Branch	Topic	Country	Winner name	Winner title
1982	Medicine	Primary health care	United Kingdom	David C. Morley	Professor
1983	Medicine	Malaria	United Kingdom	Wallace Peters	Professor
1984	Medicine	Diarrheal diseases	United States	Michael Field (de)	Professor
1984	Medicine	Diarrheal diseases	United States	William B. Greenough III	Professor
1984	Medicine	Diarrheal diseases	United States	John S. Fordtran	Professor
1985	Medicine	Viral hepatitis	United States	R. Palmer Beasley	Professor
1985	Medicine	Viral hepatitis	Italy	Mario Rizzetto	Professor
1986	Medicine	Diabetes mellitus	Switzerland	Albert Renold	Professor
1986	Medicine	Diabetes mellitus	Italy	Lelio Orci	Professor
1986	Medicine	Diabetes mellitus	Italy	Gian Franco Bottazzo	-
1987	Medicine	Prevention of blindness	New Zealand	Barrie Russell Jones	Professor
1988	Medicine	Leukemia	United Kingdom	Melvin F. Greaves	
1988	Medicine	Leukemia	United States	Janet D. Rawley	Professor
1989	Medicine	Infertility	United Kingdom	Robert G. Edwards	Professor
1989	Medicine	Infertility	United States	Luigi Mastroianni Jr.	Professor
1990	Medicine	Schistosomiasis	United Kingdom	Anthony E. Butterworth	Professor
1990	Medicine	Schistosomiasis	France	André Capron	Professor
1991	Medicine	Biochemical aspects of mental health	-	Not awarded	-
1992	Medicine	Coronary artery disease	Italy	Attilio Maseri	Professor
1993	Medicine	Acquired Immuno-deficiency diseases	France	Françoise Barré-Sinoussi	Professor
1993	Medicine	Acquired Immuno-deficiency diseases	France	Jean-Claude Chermann	Professor
1993	Medicine	Acquired Immuno-deficiency diseases	France	Luc Montagnier	Professor
1994	Medicine	Medical applications of genetic engineering	United Kingdom	Robert Williamson (de)	Professor
1994	Medicine	Medical applications of genetic engineering	United States	W. French Anderson	Professor
1995	Medicine	Molecular immunology	Canada	Tak W. Mak	Professor
1995	Medicine	Molecular immunology	United States	Mark M. Davis	Professor
1995	Medicine	Molecular immunology	United Kingdom	Gregory P. Winter	Sir
1996	Medicine	Management of the premature infant	Japan	Tetsurō Fujiwara	Professor
1996	Medicine	Management of the premature infant	Sweden	Bengt Robertson	Professor
1997	Medicine	Degenerative diseases of the nervous system	Germany	Konrad Beyreuther	Professor
1997	Medicine	Degenerative diseases of the nervous system	Canada	James F. Gusella	Professor
1997	Medicine	Degenerative diseases of the nervous system	Australia	Colin L. Masters	Professor
1998	Medicine	Control of communicable diseases	United States	Robert H. Purcell	Professor
1998	Medicine	Control of communicable diseases	United States	John L. Gerin	Professor
1999	Medicine	Allergic diseases	United Kingdom	Stephen T. Holgate	
1999	Medicine	Allergic diseases	Australia	Patrick G. Holt	Professor
2000	Medicine	Ageing	United States	Cynthia Jane Kenyon	Professor
2001	Medicine	Organ transplantation	United States	Norman E. Shumway	Professor
2001	Medicine	Organ transplantation	United Kingdom	Roy Calne	Professor
2001	Medicine	Organ transplantation	United States	Thomas Starzl	Professor
2002	Medicine	Pathophysiology of chronic heart failure	Denmark	Finn Waagstein	Professor
2002	Medicine	Pathophysiology of chronic heart failure	United States	Eugene Braunwald	Professor
2003	Medicine	Breast cancer	Italy	Umberto Veronesi	Professor
2003	Medicine	Breast cancer	Germany	Axel Ullrich	Professor
2004	Medicine	Invasive cardiology	Switzerland	Ulrich Sigwart	Professor
2005	Medicine	Tobacco risks on human health	United Kingdom	Richard Doll	Sir
2005	Medicine	Tobacco risks on human health	United Kingdom	Richard Peto	Sir
2006		Biology of vascular inflammation	United States	Michael Anthony Gimbrone Jr.	Professor
2007	Medicine	Prostate cancer	Canada	Fernand Labrie	Professor
2007	Medicine	Prostate cancer	United States	Patrick Craig Walsh	Professor
2008	Medicine	Trauma management	United States	Donald Trunkey	Professor
2008	Medicine	Trauma management	United States	Basil A. Pruitt Jr.	Professor
2009	Medicine	Molecular targeted therapy	United States	Ronald Levy	Professor
2010	Medicine	Non-arthroplasty management of degenerative joint disease	Germany	Reinhold Ganz	Professor
2010	Medicine	Non-arthroplasty management of degenerative joint disease	Canada	Johanne Martel-Pelletier	Professor
2010	Medicine	Non-arthroplasty management of degenerative joint disease	Canada	Jean-Pierre Pelletier	Professor
2011	Medicine	Stem cell therapy	United States	James A. Thomson	Professor
2011	Medicine	Stem cell therapy	Japan	Shinya Yamanaka	Professor
2012	Medicine	Minimal invasive fetal management	United States	Richard L. Berkowitz	Professor
2012	Medicine	Minimal invasive fetal management	United States	James B. Bussel	Professor
2013	Medicine	The genetics of obesity	United States	Jeffrey M. Friedman	Professor
2013	Medicine	The genetics of obesity	Canada	Douglas L. Coleman	Professor
2014	Medicine	Non-invasive diagnosis of fetal diseases	Hong Kong	Yuk Ming Dennis Lo	Professor
2015	Medicine	Intestinal microflora and human health	United States	Jeffrey Ivan Gordon	Professor
2016	Medicine	Clinical application of next generation genetics	Netherlands	Joris Andre Veltman	Professor
2016	Medicine	Clinical application of next generation genetics	Netherlands	Han G. Brunner	Professor
2017	Medicine	Biologic therapeutics in autoimmune diseases	Japan	Tadamitsu Kishimoto	Professor
2018	Medicine	Immunotherapy for cancer	United States	James P. Allison	Professor
2019	Medicine	Bone biology and osteoporosis	United States	Steven L. Teitelbaum	Professor
2019	Medicine	Bone biology and osteoporosis	Norway	Bjorn Reino Olsen	Professor
2020	Medicine	Haemoglobinopathies	United States	Stuart H. Orkin	Professor
2021	Medicine	Regenerative medicine in neurological conditions	United States	Stephen Mark Strittmatter	Professor
2021	Medicine	Regenerative medicine in neurological conditions	United Kingdom	Robin James Milroy Franklin	Professor
2022	Medicine	Gene editing technologies	United States	David Ruchien Liu	Professor
2023	Medicine	Pandemics and vaccine development	United States	Dan Barouch	Professor
2023	Medicine	Pandemics and vaccine development	United Kingdom	Sarah Catherine Gilbert	Professor
2024	Medicine	Management of Peripheral Disabilities	United States	Jerry R. Mendell	Professor
2025	Medicine	Cellular Therapy	Canada	Michel Sadelain	Professor
2026	Medicine	Discoveries Transforming Obesity Therapeutics	United States	Svetlana Mojsov	Professor

=== Science ===
Year	Branch	Topic	Country	Winner name	Winner title
1984	Science	Physics	Switzerland	Heinrich Rohrer	Professor
1984	Science	Physics	Germany	Gerd Binnig	Professor
1985	Science	-	-	Not awarded	-
1986	Science	Biochemistry	United Kingdom	Michael John Berridge	Sir
1987	Science	Mathematics	United Kingdom	Michael Atiyah	Sir
1988	Science	Biology	United Kingdom	Ricardo Miledi	Professor
1988	Science	Biology	France	Pierre Chambon	Professor
1989	Science	Physics	Germany	Theodor W. Hänsch	Professor
1989	Science	Physics	Egypt / United States	Ahmed Hassan Zewail	Professor
1990	Science	Chemistry	Canada	Raymond Urgel Lemieux	Professor
1990	Science	Chemistry	Egypt / United States	Mostafa El-Sayed	Professor
1990	Science	Chemistry	United States	Frank Albert Cotton	Professor
1991	Science	Mathematics	-	Not awarded	-
1992	Science	Biology	South Africa	Sydney Brenner	Professor
1993	Science	Physics	United States	Steven Chu	Professor
1993	Science	Physics	Germany	Herbert Walther	Professor
1994	Science	Mathematics	United States	Dennis Parnell Sullivan	Professor
1995	Science	Chemistry	United States	K. Barry Sharpless	Professor
1996	Science	Biology	United States	Günter Blobel	Professor
1996	Science	Biology	United States	James E. Rothman	Professor
1996	Science	Biology	United Kingdom	Hugh Pelham	Professor
1997	Science	Physics	United States	Eric Allin Cornell	Professor
1997	Science	Physics	United States	Carl E. Wieman	Professor
1998	Science	Mathematics	United Kingdom	Andrew John Wiles	Sir
1999	Science	Chemistry	Germany	Dieter Seebach	Professor
1999	Science	Chemistry	Japan	Ryoji Noyori	Professor
2000	Science	Biology	United States	John Craig Venter	Professor
2000	Science	Biology	United States	Edward O.Wilson	Professor
2001	Science	Physics	United States	Chen Ning Yang	Professor
2001	Science	Physics	Canada	Sajeev O. John	Professor
2002	Science	Mathematics	United States	Peter W. Shor	Professor
2002	Science	Mathematics	Russia	Yuri I. Manin	Professor
2003	Science	Chemistry	Japan	Koji Nakanishi	Professor
2003	Science	Chemistry	United States	M. Frederick Hawthorne	Professor
2004	Science	Biology	United Kingdom	Semir Zeki	Professor
2005	Science	Physics	United States	Federico Capasso	Professor
2005	Science	Physics	Austria	Anton Zeilinger	Professor
2005	Science	Physics	United States	Frank Wilczek	Professor
2006	Science	Mathematics	United Kingdom	Simon Kirwan Donaldson	Professor
2006	Science	Mathematics	India	Mudumbai Seshachalu Narasimhan	Professor
2007	Science	Chemistry	United Kingdom	James Fraser Stoddart	Professor
2008	Science	Biology	Germany	Rüdiger Wehner	Professor
2009	Science	Physics	Russia	Rashid A. Sunyaev	Professor
2009	Science	Physics	United Kingdom	Richard H. Friend	Sir
2010	Science	Mathematics	Australia	Terence Chi-Shen Tao	Professor
2010	Science	Mathematics	Italy	Enrico Bombieri	Professor
2011	Science	Chemistry	United States	George M. Whitesides	Professor
2011	Science	Chemistry	United States	Richard Zare	Professor
2012	Science	Biology	United States	Alexander Jacob Varshavsky	Professor
2013	Science	Physics	Hungary / Austria	Ferenc Krausz	Professor
2013	Science	Physics	Canada	Paul B. Corkum	Professor
2014	Science	Mathematics	Germany	Gerd Faltings	Professor
2015	Science	Chemistry	Switzerland	Michael Grätzel	Professor
2015	Science	Chemistry	Jordan / United States	Omar Mwannes Yaghi	Professor
2016	Science	Biology	United States	Vamsi Krishna Mootha	Professor
2016	Science	Biology	United Kingdom	Stephen Philip Jackson	Professor
2017	Science	Physics	Switzerland	Daniel Loss	Professor
2017	Science	Physics	Netherlands	Laurens Molenkamp	Professor
2018	Science	Mathematics	United Kingdom	John M. Ball	Sir
2019	Science	Chemistry	United States	Allen J. Bard	Professor
2019	Science	Chemistry	United States	Jean Fréchet	Professor
2020	Science	Biology	United States	Xiaodong Wang	Professor
2021	Science	Physics	United Kingdom	Stuart Stephen Papworth Parkin	Professor
2022	Science	Mathematics	United Kingdom	Martin Hairer	Professor
2022	Science	Mathematics	Tunisia	Nader Masmoudi	Professor
2023	Science	Chemistry	United States	Jackie Yi-Ru Ying	Professor
2023	Science	Chemistry	United States	Chad Alexander Mirkin	Professor
2024	Science	Biology	United States	Howard Y. Chang	Professor
2025	Science	Physics	Japan	Sumio Iijima	Professor
2026	Science	Mathematics	Argentina	Carlos Kenig	Professor

== See also ==
- List of general science and technology awards
- List of religion-related awards
- List of things named after Saudi kings
- Muhammad VI Awards for the Holy Quran
