= Ramzi Baalbaki =

Lebanese Arabic language professor

Ramzi Baalbaki رمزي بعلبكي
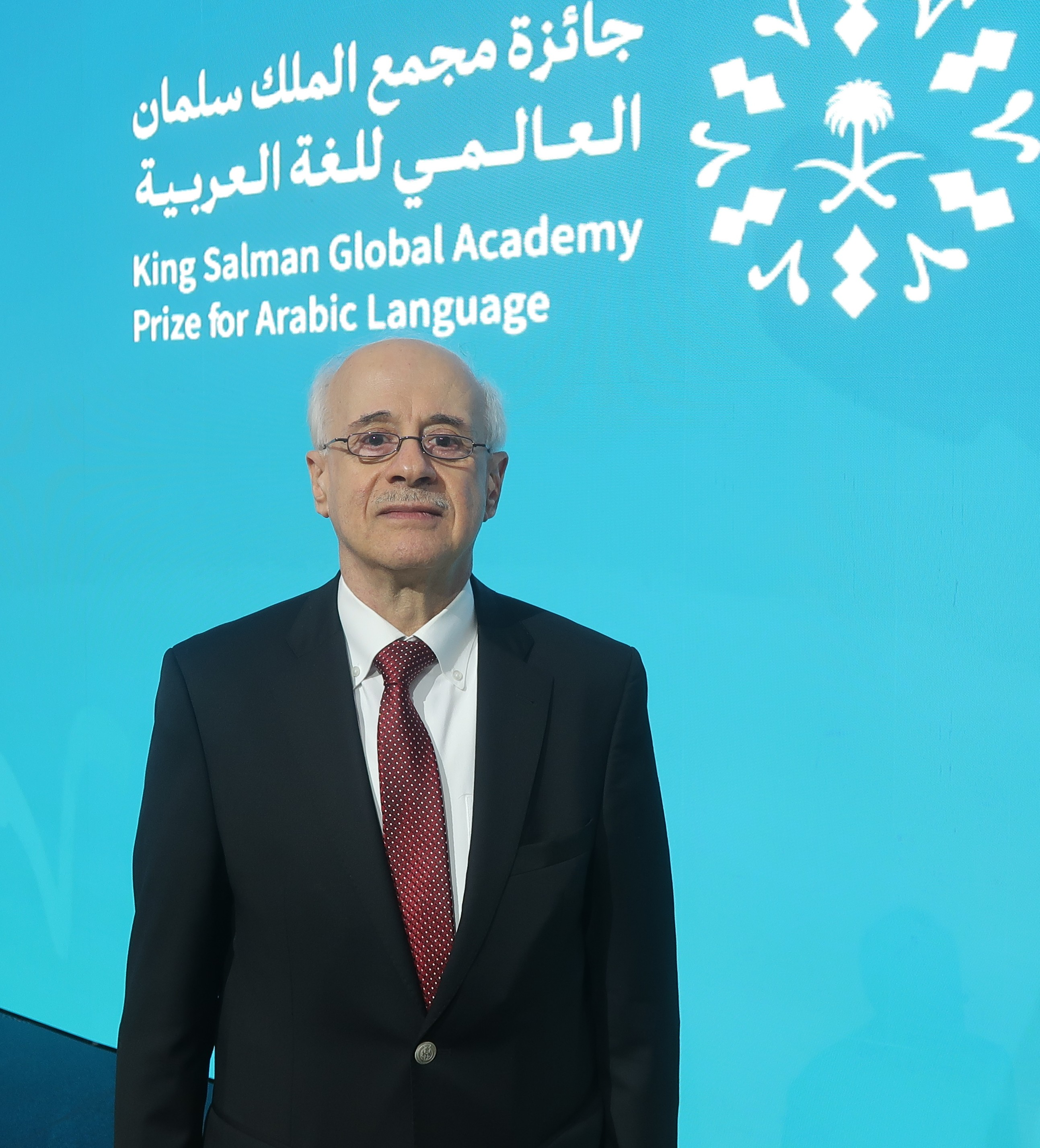
- Born: October 27, 1951 (age 74); Beirut, Lebanon
- Parent: Munir Baalbaki (father)
- Relatives: Rohi Baalbaki (brother)
- Awards: King Faisal International Prize

Academic background
- Education: American University of Beirut, SOAS, University of London

Academic work
- Era: 20th century
- Main interests: Arabic language

Ramzi Baalbaki (Arabic: رمزي بعلبكي; born October 27, 1951) is a professor of the Arabic language at the American University of Beirut in Lebanon. During a career which has spanned over thirty years, Baalbaki has been recognized as a significant contributor to the field of Arabic grammar studies.

== Education ==
Baalbaki earned his Bachelor of Arts with distinction in 1973 and his Master of Arts in 1975 from the American University of Beirut and his Doctor of Philosophy in 1978 from the School of Oriental and African Studies in London.

== Career ==
Baalbaki has been hosted as a visiting scholar at the University of Cambridge and University of Chicago as well as both a visiting scholar and scholar-in-residence at Georgetown University. His work has had a significant impact on Arabic linguistic studies in the Western world, and in 2010 he received the King Faisal International Prize for his extensive contributions to the field.

In 2013, the Arab Center for Research and Policy Studies launched the Doha Historical Dictionary of the Arabic Language with Baalbaki as the head of the project's academic council.
