= Ezz El-Din Esmail =

Egyptian critic and professor

Ezz El-Din Ismail
- Born: Jan 29, 1929
- Died: February 1, 2007 (age 78)
- Education: BA from Fuad Al-Awal University, and his master’s and Ph.D. degrees from Ain Shams University
- Title: Profession translator
- Awards: King Faisal International Prize for Arabic Literature – by the Egyptian State Prize for Literature and the Order of Sciences and Arts (First Class)

Ezz El-Din Ismail Abdel-Ghani (Arabic: عز الدين إسماعيل) (Cairo, January 29, 1929 - 2007) was an Egyptian critic and University professor who was the recipient of several awards. In 2000, he shared the King Faisal International Prize in Arabic Language and Literature with Dr. Abdullah Al-Tayeb. He was also awarded the Medal of Science and Arts (first-class) and the Mubarak Prize for Literature.

== Educational and academic progression ==
Ismail was born in Cairo on January 29, 1929, where he grew up and obtained a Bachelor of Arts from the Department of Arabic Language at Cairo University in 1951. He subsequently obtained a masters in Arabic from Ain Shams University in 1954 and a doctorate in literature with first-class honors from Ain Shams in 1959.

Ismail was Dean of the Faculty of Arts at Ain Shams University from 1980 to 1982, and was appointed a full-time professor in the Department of Arabic Language at Ain Shams University after his 60th birthday in 1989.

== Visiting professor ==
Ismail taught at the University of Omdurman in Sudan, Beirut University in Lebanon, Mohammed V University in Morocco, and King Saud University in Saudi Arabia. He also made shorter scientific visits to Yemen, Jordan, Iraq, Oman, the United Arab Emirates, Kuwait, Tunisia, Germany, and Bahrain.

== Administrative positions ==
Ismail worked as the director of the Arab Cultural Center in Bonn, West Germany (1964–1965), and Ain Shams University chose him as its dean of the Faculty of Arts in 1980. He also chaired the board of directors of the Egyptian General Book Authority in 1982, served as the secretary-general of the Supreme Council of Culture in 1984, and was the chairman For the Academy of Arts in 1985.

== Membership of literary and cultural associations ==
Ismail was a member of the general secretaries (1951), the Egyptian Literary Society (1954), the International Society for the Study of Popular Narratives (1980), the Egyptian Society for Literary Criticism (1988), the Fine Arts Lovers Society (1989), Cairo Art and Cultural Atelier (1991), the Writers Union Egypt, and the Damascus Language Complex.

== Selected writings ==
=== Criticism ===
- The aesthetic foundations in Arab criticism.
- Human issues in theatrical literature.
- Abbasid Poetry: Vision and Art.
- Contemporary Arabic poetry: its artistic and moral issues and phenomena.
- Psychological interpretation of literature.
- Literary and linguistic sources in the Arab heritage.
- Art and mankind.

=== Poetry ===
- A tear of sorrow .. a tear of joy (Diwan Al-Shaari, 2000)
- The Trial of an Unknown Man (Poetry, 1986)

=== Translation ===
- A Journey to India, by English novelist Edward Morgan Forster
- Derbent Ship, by Tajik novelist Yuri Karimov

== Honors and rewards ==
- Golden Pen Award (Yugoslavia, 1984)
- Prize of the Foundation for the Advancement of Sciences (Kuwait, 1984)
- State Merit Award (Egypt, 1985)
- Medal of Science and Arts, first-class (Egypt, 1990)
- King Faisal International Prize in Arabic Language and Literature (Saudi Arabia, 2000)
- Mubarak Prize in Literature
