= Stephen Feinstone =

American virologist

Stephen Mark Feinstone is a virologist who, together with Albert Kapikian and Robert Purcell, co-identified the Hepatitis A virus (HAV) in 1973.

He completed his undergraduate education at Johns Hopkins University graduating in 1966, and completed his medical degree at the University of Tennessee in 1969. In 1971 he joined the Laboratory of Infectious Diseases where he co-identified the Hepatitis A virus (HAV) in 1973. The same team developed the first assays that could measure the virus antigen and antibody, and using those assays, the group along with Harvey J. Alter demonstrated through the serologic exclusion of Hepatitis A and Hepatitis B that a third, previously unrecognised form of viral hepatitis existed, originally named non-A, non-B hepatitis (NANBH). Michael Houghton's laboratory at Chiron Corporation ultimately identified the agent associated with NANBH, now known as Hepatitis C, in 1989.
