= James H. Strauss Jr. =

American biologist

James H. Strauss
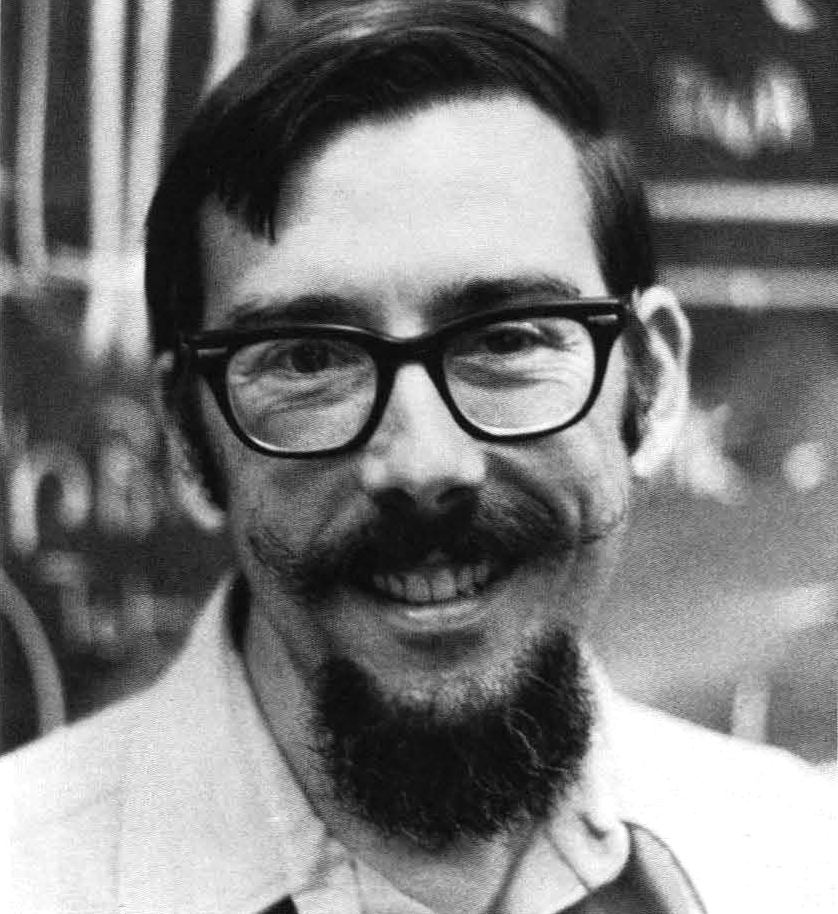
- Strauss in 1986
- Education: Saint Mary's University; California Institute of Technology
- Scientific career
- Fields: Biology
- Workplaces: California Institute of Technology
- Thesis: Studies on the RNA of bacteriophage MS2 (1967)
- Doctoral advisor: Robert L. Sinsheimer
- Doctoral students: Charles M. Rice

James Henry Strauss Jr. was an American biologist who was the Ethel Wilson Bowles and Robert Bowles Professor of Biology, Emeritus, at the California Institute of Technology.
