= Luigi Mastroianni =

American physician

Luigi Mastroianni, Jr.
- Born: 1925; New Haven, CT
- Died: November 25, 2008 (aged 82–83)
- Citizenship: United States
- Education: Boston University (MD, 1950)
- Awards: King Faisal International Prize in Medicine (1989)
- Scientific career
- Fields: reproductive medicine

Luigi Mastroianni, Jr. (1925-2008) was an American gynecologist specializing in reproductive medicine. He played a significant role in the development of both effective contraception and assisted conception.

Mastroianni was born in 1925 in New Haven, Connecticut, where both of his parents worked as gynecologists. He studied zoology at his hometown university Yale (A.B. 1946) before training in medicine at Boston University (M.D. 1950). He was professor of obstetrics and gynecology at the University of Pennsylvania from 1965 until his retirement in 2006.

In 1989 he was awarded the King Faisal International Prize in Medicine together with Sir Robert Edwards for contributions to the understanding of human infertility. He was elected a member of the National Academy of Sciences in 1993.
