= Ronald Levy (scientist) =

American medical doctor and scientist

- Education: Harvard University; Stanford University School of Medicine
- Known for: Rituxan
- Awards: 2016 AACR-CRI Lloyd J. Old Award in Cancer Immunology
- Scientific career
- Fields: Oncology
- Workplaces: Stanford University School of Medicine

Ronald Levy is an American physician and scientist at Stanford University. He specializes in lymphoma, including non-Hodgkin lymphoma, Burkitt's lymphoma and Hodgkin's disease. His research investigates how the immune system can be harnessed to fight lymphoma. His work has led to the concept that antibodies can be used as personalized anticancer drugs and to the development of an antibody-based drug, Rituxan, that is widely used to treat lymphoma.

== Education ==
Levy received an A.B. degree in biochemistry from Harvard University in 1963, and an M.D. from the Stanford University School of Medicine in 1968. He did his residency and internship at the Massachusetts General Hospital, and is board-certified in oncology by the American Board of Internal Medicine.

== Honors and awards ==
Levy's work has been recognized with multiple honors and awards, including the King Faisal International Prize, the Damashek Prize, the American Cancer Society's Medal of Honor, the Leukemia and Lymphoma Society's di Villiers International Achievement Award, the C. Chester Stock Award from the Memorial Sloan Kettering Cancer Center, the Karnofsky Award from the American Society of Clinical Oncology, and others. He is a member of the National Academy of Sciences and of the Institute of Medicine.

=== King Faisal International Prize in Medicine ===
In 2009 Levy was awarded the King Faisal International Prize in Medicine, sometimes called the "Arab Nobel Prize". He was awarded the prize for his work on Rituxan. In an interview with Haaretz, Levy said that he was very surprised when he was notified by the prize committee about his victory. He was awarded $200,000, a medal, and a certificate in English and Arabic. He and his family were invited to visit Saudi Arabia and have dinner with the Saudi King Abdullah. Levy's wife is Israeli and one of his daughters was born in Israel, yet his family and he were able to travel to Saudi Arabia with no problems. They were "treated to royal hospitality." Coincidentally, the King Faisal International Prize was first awarded 30 years ago, around the same time that Levy began his work in this field. However, despite these statements by Dr. Levy, the King Faisal Award had been awarded previously to individuals who happened to be Jews without any controversy, a notable example being Sydney Brenner who won the award in 1992.

== See also ==
- Stanford University
