= John Fordtran =

American gastroenterologist (1931–2025)

- Born: November 13, 1931; Stockdale, Texas, U.S.
- Died: February 23, 2025 (aged 93)
- Citizenship: U.S.
- Education: University of Texas at Austin; Tulane University
- Scientific career
- Fields: Gastroenterology
- Workplaces: UT Southwestern; National Institutes of Health

John Satterfield Fordtran (November 15, 1931 – February 23, 2025) was an American emeritus professor of gastroenterology and past president of the American Society for Clinical Investigation.

== Education and career ==
Fordtran was born in November 1931 in San Antonio, TX. He went to high school at the Texas Military Institute, graduating in 1949.

Fordtran graduated from the University of Texas at Austin in 1952 in biology, and from Tulane University in 1956 with an MD. He trained in internal medicine at Parkland Memorial Hospital from 1956 to 1958. He then briefly worked at the National Institutes of Health and as chair of medicine at Fort Defiance Indian Hospital in Arizona. He was a research fellow under Franz Ingelfinger from 1960 to 1962.

Donald Seldin recruited him back to UT Southwestern, where he started as an instructor and became chief of gastroenterology in 1963 and full professor of medicine in 1969.

He was elected to the American Society for Clinical Investigation in 1968 and was elected president in 1976.

Fordtran became chair of the department of medicine at Baylor University Medical Center in 1991.

Fordtran died in the rural North Texas farm he loved so much, surrounded by family.

Fordtran died on February 23, 2025, at the age of 93.

== Honors and awards ==
- 1984 King Faisal Prize in Medicine
- 1971 American Gastroenterological Association Distinguished Achievement Award
- 1990 Joseph B. Kirsner Award for Distinguished Achievement in Clinical Research in Gastroenterology, Miles and Shirley Fiterman Foundation
- 1991 NIH MERIT Award
- 1991 Distinguished Educator Award, American Gastroenterological Association
