= Robert M. Chanock =

American pediatrician and virologist

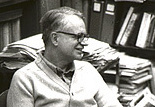
Chanock in his office, while interviewing a student

Robert Merritt Chanock (July 8, 1924 – July 30, 2010) was an American pediatrician and virologist who made major contributions to the prevention and treatment of childhood respiratory infections in more than 50 years spent at the National Institute of Allergy and Infectious Diseases.

Chanock was born July 8, 1924, in Chicago. His post-secondary plans were to study physics. When he was drafted by the United States Army in 1943, he was given the choice of attending medical school with his course of study paid for by the military or going to the front lines. Chanock passed the entrance examination and graduated from the University of Chicago in 1945 and the University of Chicago School of Medicine in 1947. He did his internship at Highland Hospital in Oakland and trained in pediatrics at the University of Chicago.

After completing his medical training, he did a fellowship at Cincinnati's Children's Hospital, where he worked under Albert Sabin, who called Chanock his "star scientific son." He was drafted by the Army in 1952 and was sent to Korea to help deal with an outbreak of Japanese encephalitis, but a ruptured appendix forced him to Tokyo, where he did research on infectious disease. He returned to Children's Hospital after being released from Army duty, and later did research at the University of Cincinnati and Johns Hopkins University.

He joined the National Institute of Allergy and Infectious Diseases, where he discovered the human respiratory syncytial virus, which is the cause of respiratory tract infections in children each winter, and is one of the most common causes of illness. Asked the best means to prevent the disease, Chanock quipped "one thing you can tell them is to have their babies in the spring".

In 1962 Robert Chanock visited Dr. Leonard Hayflick at the Wistar Institute in Philadelphia, Pennsylvania, to obtain a culture of his normal human fetal cell strain, WI-38, because of Hayflick's report that it replicated all of the then known human viruses. Chanock described his work with the “Eaton Agent” to Hayflick where it was assumed it to be the viral cause of Primary Atypical Pneumonia (PAP) or “walking pneumonia” in humans. This cause was never proven.

Hayflick suggested to Chanock that the cause might be a mycoplasma (then called a PPLO). Hayflick wrote his thesis on mycoplasma causes of respiratory diseases in animals and suggested to Chanock that PAP might be caused by a mycoplasma. Chanock replied that he never heard of PPLO's. At Hayflick's request egg yolk in which the Eaton Agent was grown was sent to him by Chanock. Hayflick grew a mycoplasma, the smallest free-living microorganism, on a unique agar growth medium that he developed. Together they proved that it was the etiological agent of PAP. Hayflick named the organism Mycoplasma pneumoniae.

Chanock was named head of the NIAID's Laboratory of Infectious Diseases in 1968. The WI-38 normal human cell strain gifted to Chanock resulted in the development of an adenovirus vaccine in 1964. This vaccine has been used in the world's military where the virus produces a disease similar to the flu and forces recruits to enter clinics for many days.

Researchers working with Chanock developed another vaccine using WI-38 to prevent Hepatitis A. They also produced a rotavirus vaccine, addressing the most common cause of severe diarrhoea in infants and young children, as well as an influenza virus vaccine in the form of a nasal spray. Efforts were undertaken to create a vaccine to deal with dengue fever, though efforts to create immunizations for para-influenza viruses and respiratory syncytial virus were unsuccessful.

Chanock was elected to the United States National Academy of Sciences in 1973. He was also honored with the Robert Koch Prize, the Albert B. Sabin Gold Medal, the E. Mead Johnson Award, the Public Health Service's Meritorious Service Medal and Distinguished Service Medal. In 1972, he was presented with the Gorgas Medal from the Association of Military Surgeons of the United States (AMSUS).

NIAID Director Dr. Anthony Fauci called Chanock "an outstanding scientist whose innumerable contributions to the understanding of viral diseases helped make the world a healthier place for millions of people".

A resident of Bethesda, Maryland, Chanock died at age 86 on July 30, 2010, at an assisted living facility in Sykesville, Maryland, due to complications of Alzheimer's disease. He was survived by a son, Stephen Chanock, and four grandchildren.
