= Multiple birth =

Culmination of a multiple pregnancy where two or more offspring are born

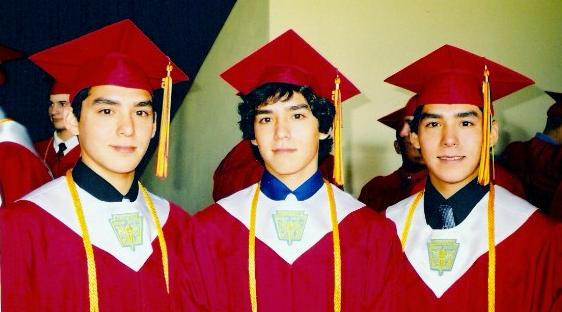
Triplet brothers at graduation

A multiple birth is the culmination of a multiple pregnancy, wherein the mother gives birth to two or more babies. A term most applicable to vertebrate species, multiple births occur in most kinds of mammals, with varying frequencies. Such births are often named according to the number of offspring, as in twins and triplets.

In non-humans, the whole group may also be referred to as a litter, and multiple births may be more common than single births. Multiple births in humans are the exception and can be exceptionally rare in the largest mammals.

A multiple pregnancy may be the result of the fertilization of a single egg that then splits to create identical fetuses, or it may be the result of the fertilization of multiple eggs that create fraternal ("non-identical") fetuses, or it may be a combination of these factors. A multiple pregnancy from a single zygote is called monozygotic, from two zygotes is called dizygotic, or from three or more zygotes is called polyzygotic. Similarly, the siblings themselves from a multiple birth may be referred to as monozygotic if they are identical or as dizygotic (in cases of twins) or polyzygotic (for three or more siblings) if they are fraternal, i.e., non-identical.

Each fertilized ovum (zygote) may produce a single embryo, or it may split into two or more embryos, each carrying the same genetic material. Fetuses resulting from different zygotes are called fraternal and share only 50% of their genetic material, as ordinary full siblings from separate births do. Fetuses resulting from the same zygote share 100% of their genetic material and hence are called identical. Identical twins are almost always the same sex; however, in rare circumstances, chromosomal mutations can lead to different sexes being expressed.

== Terminology ==
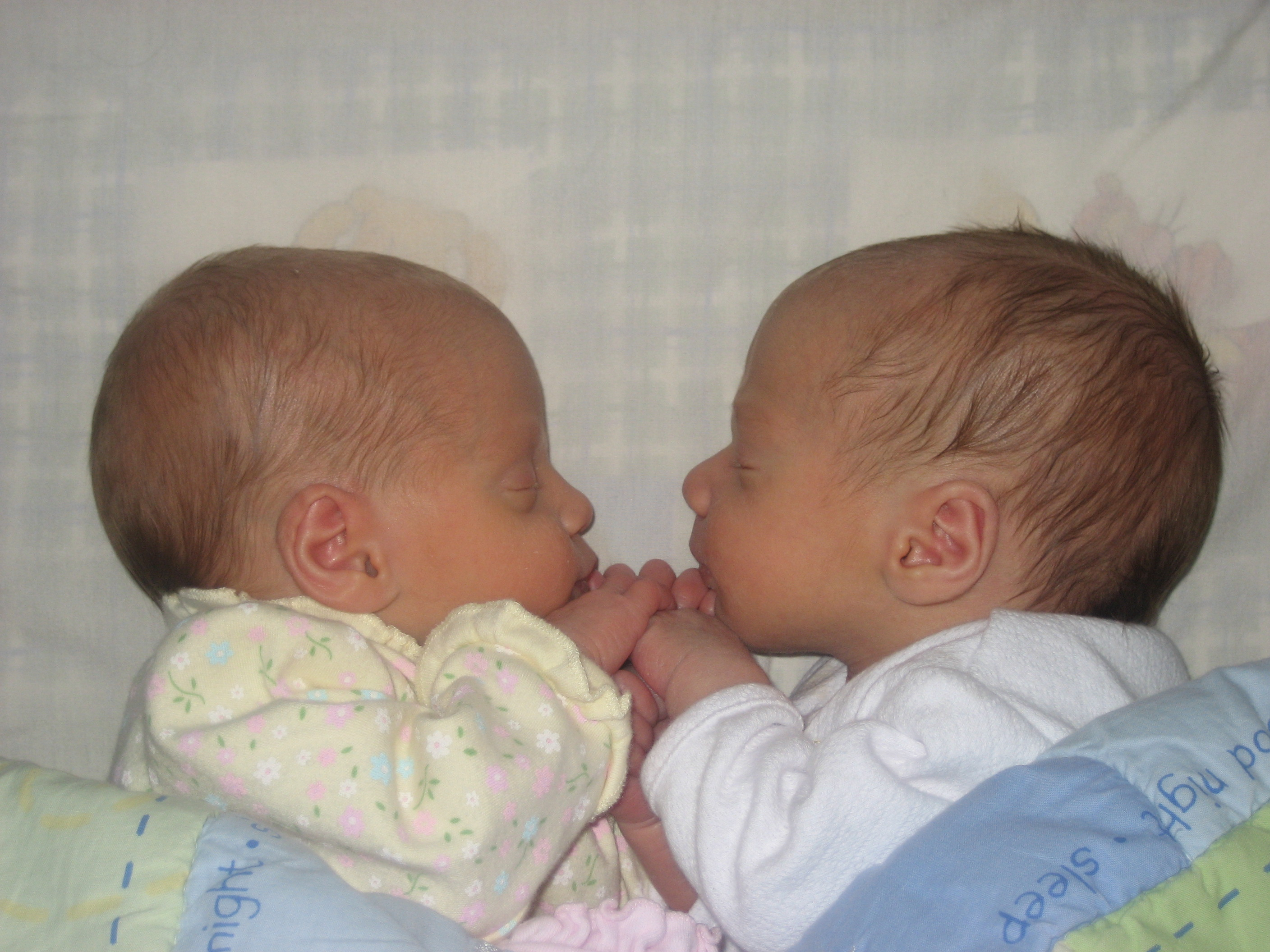
Fraternal twins at two weeks old. The technical term for "fraternal" is "dizygotic" (twins) or "polyzygotic" (triplets or higher order).

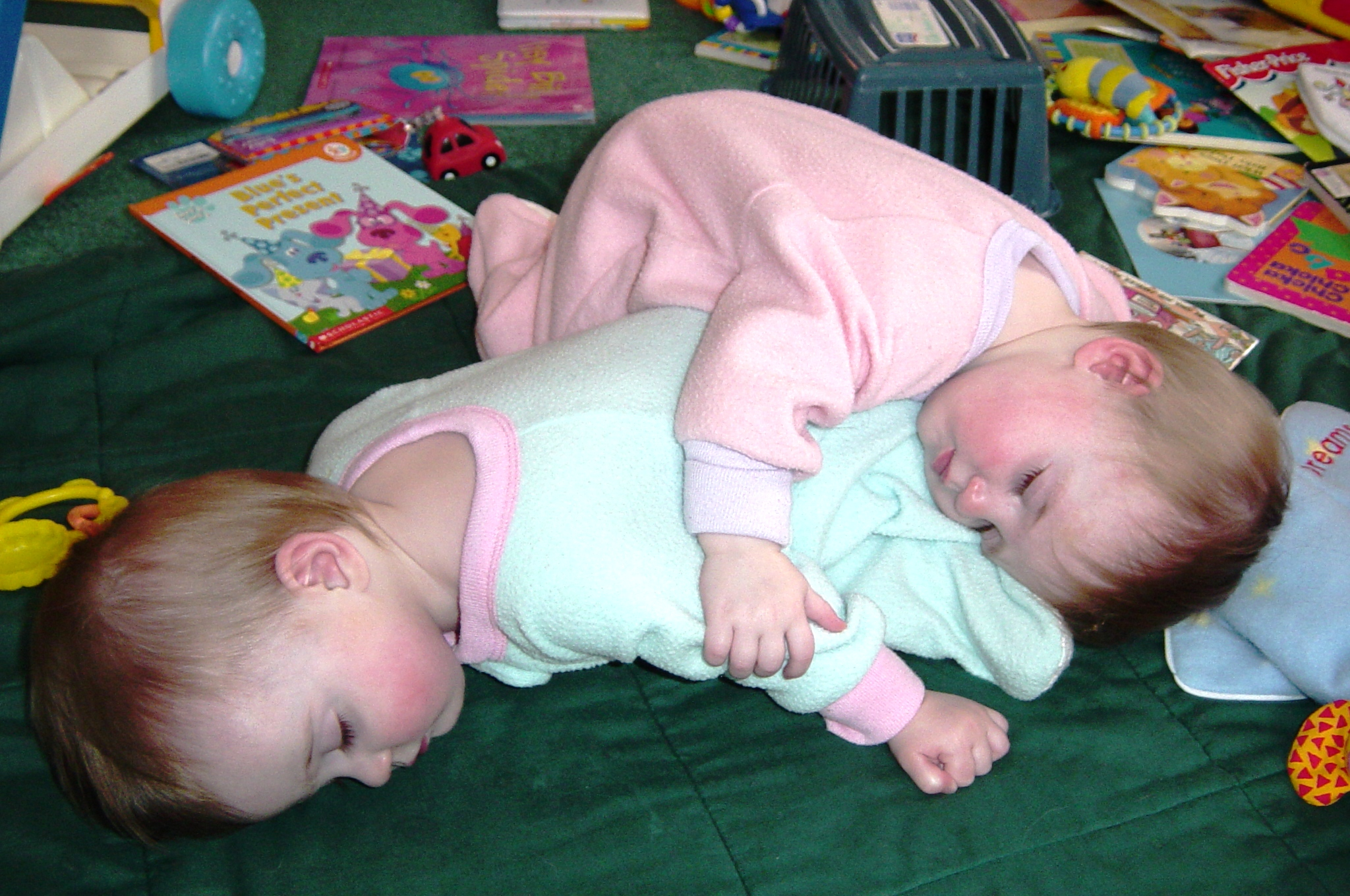
Fraternal twin sisters taking a nap. Nonidentical twins, the most common kind of multiple birth among humans, occur in about 1 out of every 80 pregnancies.

Terms used for the number of offspring in a multiple birth, where a number higher than three ends with the suffix -uplet:

- two offspring – twins
- three offspring – triplets
- four offspring – quadruplets
- five offspring – quintuplets
- six offspring – sextuplets
- seven offspring – septuplets
- eight offspring – octuplets
- nine offspring – nonuplets
- ten offspring – decuplets

Terms used for multiple births or the genetic relationships of their offspring are based on the zygosity of the pregnancy:

- Monozygotic – multiple (typically two) fetuses produced by the splitting of a single zygote
- Polyzygotic – multiple fetuses produced by two or more zygotes:
  - Dizygotic – multiple (typically two) fetuses produced by two zygotes
  - Trizygotic – three or more fetuses produced by three zygotes
  - Sesquizygotic – an egg which is fertilized by 2 sperms, which produce 2 fetuses

Multiple pregnancies are also classified by how the fetuses are surrounded by one or more placentas (chorionicity) and amniotic sacs (amnionicity).

== Human multiple births ==
In humans, the average length of pregnancy (2 weeks fewer than gestation) is 38 weeks with a single fetus. This average decreases for each additional fetus: to 36 weeks for twin births, 32 weeks for triplets, and 30 weeks for quadruplets. With the decreasing gestation time, the risks from immaturity at birth and subsequent viability increase with the size of the sibling group. Only in the twentieth century have more than four children survived infancy.

Recent history has also seen increasing numbers of multiple births. In the United States, it has been estimated that by 2011, 36% of twin births, and 78% of triplet and higher-order births resulted from conception by assisted reproductive technology.

=== Twins ===
Twins are by far the most common form of multiple births in humans. The U.S. Centers for Disease Control and Prevention report more than 132,000 sets of twins out of 3.9 million births of all kinds each year, about 3.4%, or 1 in 30. Compared to other multiple births, twin births account for 97% of them in the US. Without fertility treatments, the probability is about 1 in 60; with fertility treatments, it can be as high as 20-25%.

A hyperovulation gene in the mother can cause dizygotic (fraternal) twins. Although the father's genes do not influence the woman's chances of having twins, he could influence his children's chances of having twins by passing on a copy of the hyperovulation gene to them.

Monozygotic (identical) twins do not run in families. The twinning is random, due to the egg splitting, so all parents have an equal chance of conceiving identical twins.

=== Triplets ===
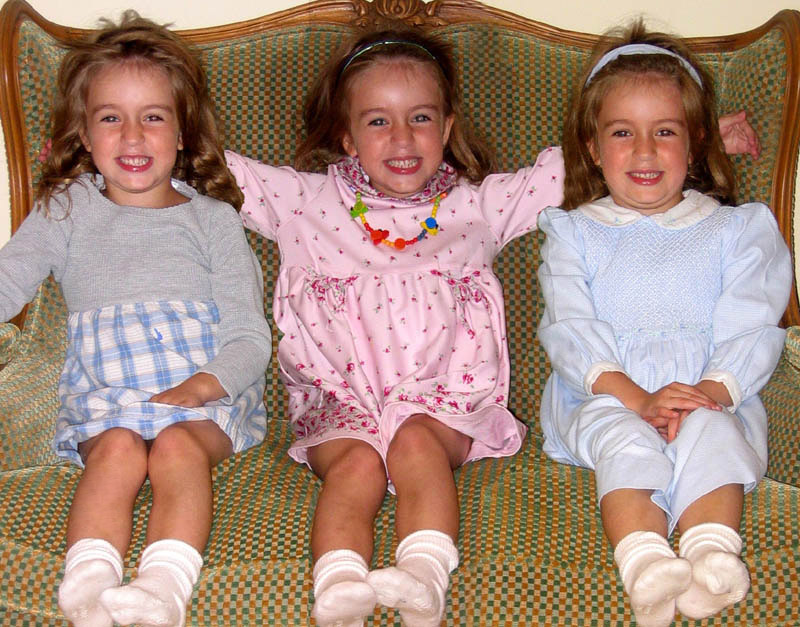
Identical triplets like these three sisters occur when a single fertilized egg splits in two and then one of the resulting two zygotes splits again.

Monoamniotic triplets as seen on ultrasound

Triplets can be either fraternal, identical, or a combination of both. The most common are strictly fraternal triplets, which come from a polyzygotic pregnancy of three eggs. Less common are triplets from a dizygotic pregnancy, where one zygote divides into two identical fetuses, and the other does not. The least common are identical triplets, three fetuses from one egg. In this case, sometimes the original zygote divides into two, and then one of those two zygotes divides again, but the other does not, or the original zygote divides into three.

Triplets are far less common than twins, according to the U.S. Centers for Disease Control and Prevention, accounting for only about 4,300 sets in 3.9 million births, just a little more than .1%, or 1 in 1,000. According to the American Society of Reproductive Medicine, only about 10% of these are identical triplets: about 1 in ten thousand. Nevertheless, only 4 sets of identical triplets were reported in the U.S. during 2015, about one in a million. According to Victor Khouzami, Chairman of Obstetrics at Greater Baltimore Medical Center, "No one really knows the incidence".

Identical triplets or quadruplets are very rare and result when the original fertilized egg splits and then one of the resultant cells splits again (for triplets) or, even more rarely, a further split occurs (for quadruplets). The odds of having identical triplets is unclear. News articles and other non-scientific organizations give odds from one in 60,000 to one in 200 million pregnancies.

=== Quadruplets ===
Quadruplets are much rarer than twins or triplets. One famous set of identical quadruplets was the Genain quadruplets, all of whom developed schizophrenia. Quadruplets are sometimes referred to as "quads". In July 2026, a woman gave birth to identical quadruplet daughters in Brisbane, Australia. In what was described as an extremely rare occurrence, the babies were conceived naturally, split from a singular fertilised egg, and all shared a single placenta. They were delivered by caesarean section at 28 weeks and four days gestation at the Royal Brisbane and Women's Hospital.

=== Quintuplets ===
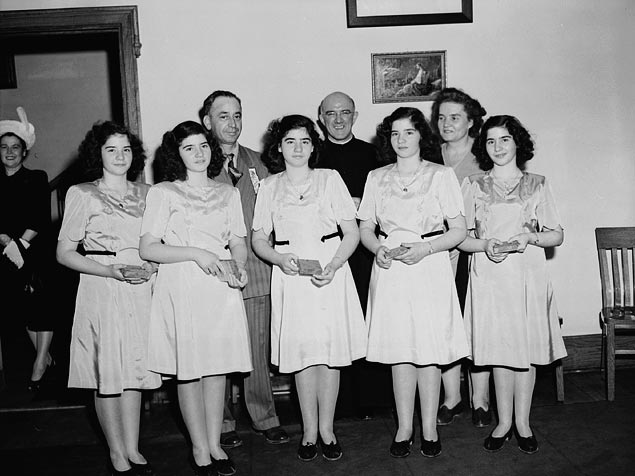
The Canadian Dionne sisters, seen in this 1947 photograph, were the first quintuplets known to survive infancy.

Quintuplets occur naturally in 1 in 55,000,000 births. The first quintuplets known to survive infancy were the identical female Canadian Dionne quintuplets, born in 1934. Quintuplets are sometimes referred to as "quins" in the UK and "quints" in North America. A famous set of all-girl quintuplets are the Busby quints from the TV series OutDaughtered.

=== Sextuplets ===
Born in Liverpool, England, on November 18, 1983, the Walton sextuplets were the world's first all-female surviving sextuplets, and the world's fourth known set of surviving sextuplets. Another well-known set of sextuplets is the Gosselin sextuplets, born on 10 May 2004, in Hershey, Pennsylvania. Reality television shows Jon & Kate Plus 8 and later Kate Plus 8 have chronicled the lives of these sextuplets. Other shows of this nature include Table for 12 and Sweet Home Sextuplets.

=== Very high-order multiple births ===
In 1997, the McCaughey septuplets, born in Des Moines, Iowa, became the first septuplets known to survive infancy. The first surviving set of octuplets on record are the Suleman octuplets, born in 2009 in Bellflower, California. In 2019, all 8 children celebrated their 10th birthday. Multiple births of as many as 9 babies have been born alive; In May 2021, the Cissé nonuplets were born in Morocco to Halima Cissé, a 25-year-old woman from Mali. As of May 2023, two years since their births, all 9 are still living and reportedly in good health.

The list of multiple births covers notable examples.

== Causes and frequency ==
The frequency of N multiple births from natural pregnancies has been given as approximately 1:89^{N−1} (Hellin's law) and as about 1:80^{N−1}. This gives:

- 1:89 (= 1.1%) or 1:80 (= 1.25%) for twins
- 1:89^{2} (= 1:7921, about 0.013%) or 1:80^{2} (= 1:6400) for triplets
- 1:89^{3} (= approx. 0.000142%, less than 1:700,000) or 1:80^{3} for quadruplets

North American dizygotic twinning occurs about once in 83 conceptions, and triplets about once in 8000 conceptions. US figures for 2010 were:

- Twins – 132,562 (3.31%)
- Triplets – 5,503 (0.14%)
- Quadruplets – 313 (0.0078%)
- Quintuplets and more – 37 (0.00092%)

Human multiple births can occur either naturally (the woman ovulates multiple eggs or the fertilized egg splits into two) or as the result of infertility treatments such as in vitro fertilization (several embryos are often transferred to compensate for lower quality) or fertility drugs (which can cause multiple eggs to mature in one ovulatory cycle).

For reasons that are not yet known, the older a woman is, the more likely she is to have a multiple birth naturally. It is theorized that this is due to the higher level of follicle-stimulating hormone that older women sometimes have as their ovaries respond more slowly to FSH stimulation.

The number of multiple births has increased since the late 1970s. For example, in Canada between 1979 and 1999, the number of multiple-birth babies increased 35%. Before the advent of ovulation-stimulating drugs, triplets were quite rare (approximately 1 in 8000 births) and higher-order births much rarer still. Much of the increase can probably be attributed to the impact of fertility treatments, such as in-vitro fertilization. Younger patients who undergo treatment with fertility medication containing artificial FSH, followed by intrauterine insemination, are particularly at risk for multiple births of higher order.

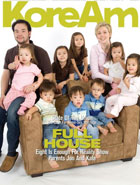
The Gosselin sextuplets with their parents and sisters, cover of KoreAm, May 2008

Certain factors appear to increase the likelihood that a woman will naturally conceive multiples. These include:

- mother's age: women over 35 are more likely to have multiples than younger women
- mothers' use of fertility drugs: approximately 35% of pregnancies arising through the use of fertility treatments such as IVF involve more than one child

Women conceiving multiples over the age of 35 increase the risk of having fetuses with certain conditions and complications that are not as common in women who are pregnant.

The increasing use of fertility drugs and consequent increased rate of multiple births has made the phenomenon of multiples more frequent and hence more visible. In 2004 the birth of sextuplets, six children, to Pennsylvania couple Kate and Jon Gosselin helped them to launch their television series, originally Jon & Kate Plus 8 and (following their divorce) Kate Plus 8, which became the highest-rated show on the TLC network.

== Risks ==
=== Premature birth and low birth weight ===
Babies born from multiple-birth pregnancies are much more likely to result in premature birth than those from single pregnancies. 51% of twins and 91% of triplets are born preterm, compared to 9.4% in singletons. 14% of twins and 41% of triplets are even born very preterm, compared to 1.7% in singletons.

Drugs known as beta-mimetics can be used to relax the muscles of the uterus and delay birth in singleton pregnancies. There is some evidence that these drugs can also reduce the risk of preterm birth for twin pregnancies, but existing studies are small. More data is required before solid conclusions can be drawn. Likewise, existing studies are too small to determine if a cervical suture is effective for reducing prematurity in cases of multiple birth.

As a result of preterm birth, multiples tend to have lower birth weight than singletons. Exceptions are possible, however, as with the Kupresak triplets, born in 2008 in Mississauga, Ontario, Canada. Their combined weight was 17 lbs, 2.7 oz (7.8 kg), which set a world record. Two of the triplets were similar in size and, as expected, moderately low birth weight. The two combined weighed 9 lbs, 2.7 oz (4.2 kg). The third triplet, however, was much larger and weighed 8 lbs (3.6 kg) individually.

=== Cerebral palsy ===
Cerebral palsy is more common among multiple births than single births, being 2.3 per 1,000 survivors in singletons, 13 in twins, and 45 in triplets in North West England. This is likely a side effect of premature birth and low birth weight.

=== Behavioral issues ===
Premature birth is associated with a higher risk for a breadth of behavioral and socioemotional difficulties that begin in childhood and continue through teenagehood and often into adulthood. Conditions where the risk is greatest include attention deficit hyperactivity disorder, autism spectrum disorder, and anxiety disorders.

=== Incomplete separation ===
Multiples may be monochorionic, sharing the same chorion (placenta), with resultant risk of twin-to-twin transfusion syndrome. Monochorionic multiples may even be monoamniotic, sharing the same amniotic sac, increasing the risk of umbilical cord compression and cord entanglement. In very rare cases, twins may be conjoined, possibly impairing the function of internal organs.

=== Mortality rate (stillbirth) ===
Multiples are also known to have a higher mortality rate. It is more common for multiple births to be stillborn, while for singletons the risk is not as high. A literary review on multiple pregnancies shows a study done on one set each of septuplets and octuplets, two sets of sextuplets, 8 sets of quintuplets, 17 sets of quadruplets, and 228 sets of triplets. By doing this study, Hammond found that the mean gestational age (how many weeks when birthed) at birth was 33.4 weeks for triplets and 31 weeks for quadruplets. This shows that stillbirth happens usually 3–5 weeks before the woman reaches full term, and also that for sextuplets or higher it almost always ends in death of the fetuses. Though multiples are at a greater risk of being stillborn, there is inconclusive evidence whether the actual mortality rate is higher in multiples than in singletons.

=== Prevention in IVF ===
Today, many multiple pregnancies are the result of in vitro fertilisation (IVF). In a 1997 study of 2,173 embryo transfers performed as part of in vitro fertilisation (IVF), 34% were successfully delivered pregnancies. The overall multiple pregnancy rate was 31.3% (24.7% twins, 5.8% triplets, and .08% quadruplets). Because IVFs are producing more multiples, several efforts are being made to reduce the risk of multiple births- specifically triplets or more. Medical practitioners are doing this by limiting the number of embryos per embryo transfer to one or two. That way, the risks for the mother and fetuses are decreased.

The appropriate number of embryos to be transferred depends on the woman's age, whether it is the first, second, or third full IVF cycle attempt, and whether top-quality embryos are available. According to a guideline from The National Institute for Health and Care Excellence (NICE) in 2013, the number of embryos transferred in a cycle should be chosen as in following table:

Age	Attempt no.	Embryos transferred
<37 years	1st	1
<37 years	2nd	1 if top-quality
<37 years	3rd	No more than 2
37–39 years	1st & 2nd	1 if top-quality
37–39 years	1st & 2nd	2 if not top-quality
37–39 years	3rd	No more than 2
40–42 years		2

Also, it is recommended to use single embryo transfer in all situations if a top-quality blastocyst is available.

== Management ==
Bed rest has not been found to change outcomes and is not generally recommended outside of a research study.

=== Selective reduction (procedure) ===
Selective reduction is the practice of reducing the number of fetuses in a multiple pregnancy; it is also called "multifetal reduction".

The procedure generally takes two days; the first day for testing to select which fetuses to remove, and the second day for the procedure itself, in which potassium chloride is injected into the heart of each selected fetus under the guidance of ultrasound imaging. Risks of the procedure include bleeding requiring transfusion, rupture of the uterus, retained placenta, infection, a miscarriage, and prelabor rupture of membranes. Each of these appears to be rare. There are also ethical concerns about this procedure, since it is a form of abortion, and also because of concerns over which fetuses are terminated and why.

Selective reduction was developed in the mid-1980s, as people in the field of assisted reproductive technology became aware of the risks that multiple pregnancies carried for the mother and for the fetuses.

=== Care in pregnancy ===
Women with a multiple pregnancy are usually seen more regularly by midwives or doctors than those with singleton pregnancies because of the higher risks of complications. However, there is currently no evidence to suggest that specialised antenatal services produce better outcomes for mother or babies than 'normal' antenatal care. Women with a multiple pregnancy are also encouraged after 24 weeks to be on bed rest. This recommendation is not a requirement for women with a multiple pregnancy, but it has been used as a method to prevent complications. Some doctors may prescribe this method to err on the safe side if they believe it is necessary.

=== Nutrition ===
As preterm birth is such a risk for women with multiple pregnancies, it has been suggested that these women should be encouraged to follow a high-calorie diet to increase the birth weights of the babies. Evidence around this subject is not yet good enough to advise women to do this because the long-term effects of the high-calorie diets on the mother are not known.

=== Caesarean section or vaginal delivery ===
Fetal position (the way the babies are lying in the womb) usually determines if they are delivered by caesarean section or vaginally. A review of good quality research on this subject found that if the twin that will be born first (i.e., is lowest in the womb) is head down, there is no good evidence that caesarean section will be safer than a vaginal birth for the mother or babies. One study found that 44% of twin pregnancies planned for vaginal delivery still ended up having Cesarean section for unplanned reasons such as pregnancy complications. It has been estimated that 75% of twin pregnancies in the United States were delivered by Cesarean section in 2008. For comparison, the rate of Cesarean section for all pregnancies in the general population varies between 14% and 40%.

Monoamniotic twins (twins that form after the splitting of a fertilised egg and share the same amniotic fluid sac) are at more risk of complications than twins that have their own sacs. There is also insufficient evidence around whether to deliver the babies early by caesarean section or to wait for labour to start naturally while running checks on the babies' wellbeing. The birth of this type of twins should therefore be decided with the mother and her family and should take into account the need for good neonatal care services.

=== Neonatal intensive care ===
Multiple-birth infants are usually admitted to neonatal intensive care or a special care nursery in the hospital immediately after being born. A 1998 review of 55 triplet pregnancies found that 149 of the 165 babies were admitted to neonatal intensive care after the delivery.

== Society and culture ==
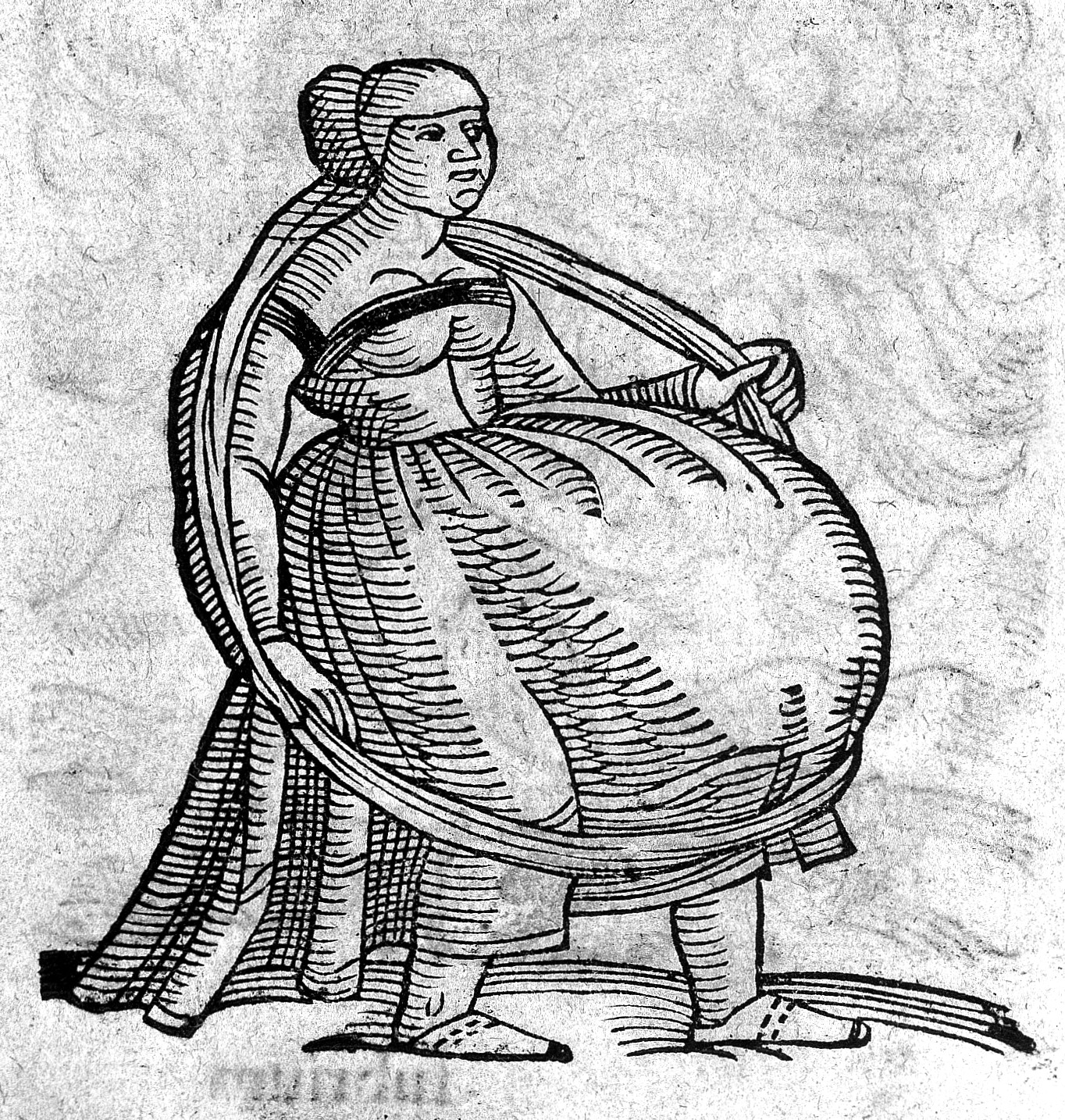
A woman bearing 9 or 11 children, Prodigiorum ac ostentorum chronicon, 1557, by Conrad Lycosthenes

=== Insurance coverage ===
==== Iran ====
In Iran, the government provides free housing to families that have birthed quintuplets.

==== United States ====
A study by the U.S. Agency for Healthcare Research and Quality found that, in 2011, pregnant women covered by private insurance in the United States were older and more likely to have multiple gestation than women covered by Medicaid.

=== Cultural aspects ===
Certain cultures consider multiple births a portent of either good or evil.

Twins were important to Maya religion, with evidence of twin sacrifice being related to the myth of the Hero Twins.

In Ancient Rome, twins were valued as a sign of divine favour due to their association with divine twins like Romulus and Remus and Castor and Pollux Because of the legend of the Horatii triplets defending Rome against the Curiatii triplets, a law stated that "the parents of triplets shall receive from the public treasury the cost of rearing them till they are grown." However, births of more than two children were also commonly viewed as bad omens, appearing in lists of disquieting events.

Greek mythology features multiple stories of twins sired by two different fathers, one mortal and one divine. One example is Heracles, son on Zeus, and his twin Iphicles. Though Castor and Polydeuces are usually referred to as twins, they could be considered quadruplets because they were born (from eggs) at the same time as their sisters Helen (of Troy) and Clytemnestra. Helen and Polydeuces were fathered by Zeus, while Clytemnestra and Castor were fathered by Leda's husband Tyndareus.

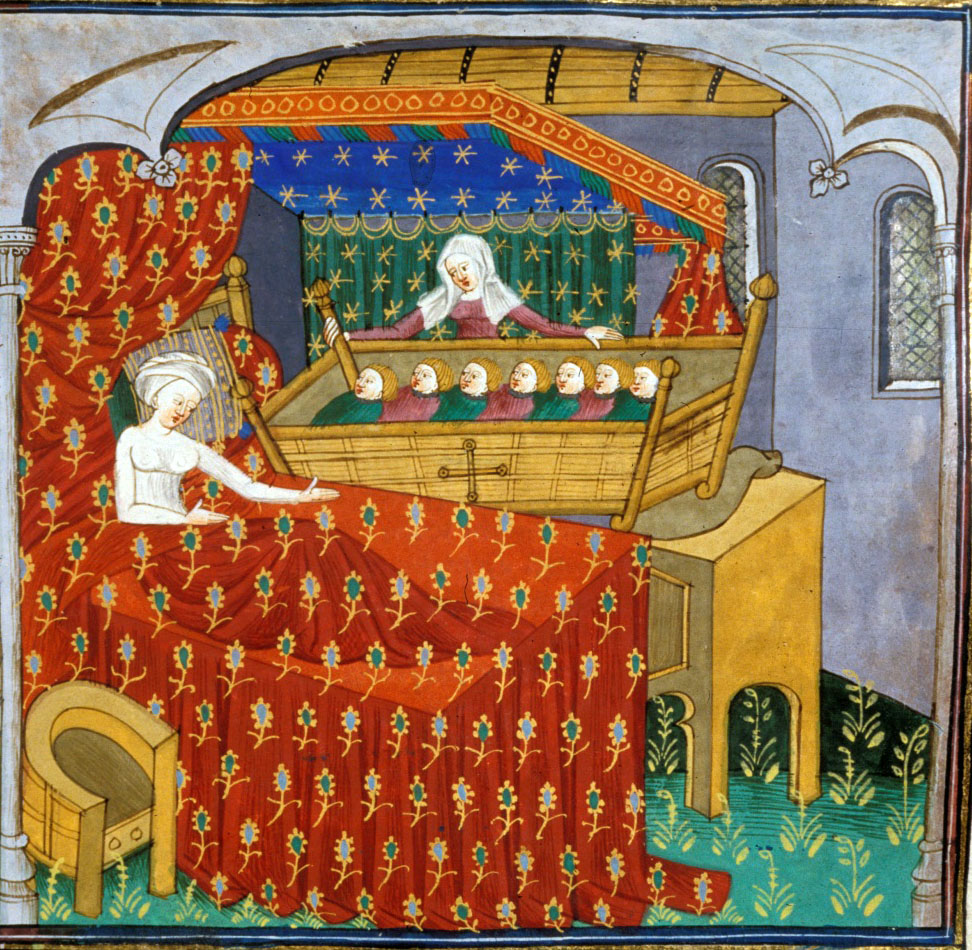
Beatrix with her seven swan-children, from the Knight of the Swan romance (Talbot Shrewsbury Book)

In certain medieval European chivalric romances, such as Marie de France's Le Fresne, a woman cites a multiple birth (often to a lower-class woman) as proof of adultery on her part; while this may reflect a widespread belief, it is invariably treated as malicious slander, to be justly punished by the accuser having a multiple birth of her own, and the events of the romance are triggered by her attempt to hide one or more of the children. A similar effect occurs in the Knight of the Swan romance, in the Beatrix variants of the Swan-Children; her taunt is punished by giving birth to seven children at once, and her wicked mother-in-law returns her taunt before exposing the children.

== Ethics of multiple births ==
=== Medically assisted procreation ===
In vitro fertilization (IVF) was first successfully completed in the 1970s as a form of assisted reproductive technology. Out of all the assisted reproductive technologies available that are currently in practice, in vitro fertilization has the highest chance of producing multiple offspring. For each female egg, IVF currently has a 60–70% chance of conceiving. Fertilization is made possible by administering a fertility drug to the eggs or by directly injecting semen into the eggs. There is an increased chance for women over the age of 35 to have multiple births. IVF is a common genetic and ethical topic. Through IVF, individuals can produce offspring successfully when natural procreation is not viable. However, in vitro can become genetically specific and allow for the selection of particular genes or expressible traits to be present dominantly in the formed embryo. Ethical dilemmas arise when determining health care coverage and the deviation from natural selection and gene variations. Regarding multiple births, different ethical concerns arise from the use of in vitro fertilization. Overall, multiple pregnancies can cause potential harm to the mother and children due to potential complications. Such complications can include uterine bleeding and children not receiving equal nutrients. IVF has also revealed some pre term deliveries and lower birth weights in babies. While some view medically assisted procreation as a saving grace to have children, others consider these procedure to be unnatural and costly to the community.

=== Multifetal pregnancy reduction ===
Multifetal pregnancy reduction is the reduction of one or more embryos from the bearing woman. Selective reduction usually occurs for pregnancies assisted by assisted reproductive technology (ART). The first multifetal pregnancy reductions to occur in a clinical setting took place in the 1980s. The procedure aims to reduce pregnancies down to approximately one to two fetuses. The overarching purpose of the procedure is not primarily the termination of the fetus(es), but to increase the survival odds of the remaining fetus(es) and improve maternal outcomes. However, multifetal pregnancy reduction raises ethical questions similar to those surrounding the abortion debate. Overall, most multifetal pregnancy reductions that occur as a result of ART are being done for the protection of the mother's health and to maximize the health of the remaining fetuses.

== See also ==
- Biological reproduction
- Conjoined twins
- Feodor Vassilyev, Russian father of 87 children (c.1707–1782)
- Girls and Their Monsters, a 2023 non-fiction book about the Morlock girls, identical quadruplets born in 1930
- Half a Dozen Babies, a 1999 drama film about the 1993-born Dilley sextuplets
- List of multiple births
- List of twins
- Multiples Illuminated: A Collection of Stories and Advice from Parents of Twins, Triplets and More
- Only child
- Quints, a Disney Channel movie about a teenage girl becoming the older sister to quintuplets
- Superfecundation (multiple pregnancy resulting from separate acts of sexual intercourse)
- Ten Brothers, a Chinese legend about decuplet brothers with superpowers
- Three Identical Strangers
