= Cord compression =

Cord compression may refer to:

- Spinal cord compression
- Umbilical cord compression
