= Sacrococcygeal teratoma =

- Specialty: Oncology

Sacrococcygeal teratoma (SCT) is a type of tumor known as a teratoma that develops at the base of the coccyx (tailbone) and is thought to be primarily derived from remnants of the primitive streak. Sacrococcygeal teratomas are benign 75% of the time, malignant 12% of the time, and the remainder are considered "immature teratomas" that share benign and malignant features. Benign sacrococcygeal teratomas are more likely to develop in younger children who are less than 5 months old, and older children are more likely to develop malignant sacrococcygeal teratomas.

The Currarino syndrome, due to an autosomal dominant mutation in the MNX1 gene, consists of a presacral mass (usually a mature teratoma or anterior meningocele), anorectal malformation and sacral dysgenesis.

== Presentation ==
=== Complications ===
Maternal complications of pregnancy may include mirror syndrome. Maternal complications of delivery may include a cesarean section or, alternatively, a vaginal delivery with mechanical dystocia.

Complications of the mass effect of a teratoma in general are addressed on the teratoma page. Complications of the mass effect of a large SCT may include hip dysplasia, bowel obstruction, urinary obstruction, hydronephrosis and hydrops fetalis. Even a small SCT can produce complications of mass effect, if it is presacral (Altman Type IV). In the fetus, severe hydronephrosis may contribute to inadequate lung development. Also in the fetus and newborn, the anus may be imperforate.

Later complications of the mass effect and/or surgery may include neurogenic bladder, other forms of urinary incontinence, fecal incontinence, and other chronic problems resulting from accidental damage to or sacrifice of nerves and muscles within the pelvis. Removal of the coccyx may include additional complications. In one review of 25 patients, however, the most frequent complication was an unsatisfactory appearance of the surgical scar.

==== Late effects ====
Late effects are of two kinds: consequences of the tumor itself, and consequences of surgery and other treatments for the tumor.

Complications of not removing the coccyx may include both recurrence of the teratoma and metastatic cancer. Late malignancies usually involve incomplete excision of the coccyx and are adenocarcinoma.Although functional disability in survivors is common, a small comparative study found a nonsignificant difference between SCT survivors and a matched control group.

In rare cases, pelvic scarring may necessitate that a pregnant woman who is a SCT survivor deliver her baby by cesarean section.

== Cause ==
SCT is seen in 1 in every 35,000 live births, and is the most common tumor presenting in newborn humans. Most SCTs are found in babies and children, but SCTs have been reported in adults and the increasingly routine use of prenatal ultrasound exams has dramatically increased the number of diagnosed SCTs presenting in fetuses. Like other teratomas, an SCT can grow very large. Unlike other teratomas, an SCT sometimes grows larger than the rest of the fetus.

Sacrococcygeal teratomas are the most common type of germ cell tumors (both benign and malignant) diagnosed in neonates, infants, and children younger than 4 years. SCTs occur more often in girls than in boys; ratios of 3:1 to 4:1 have been reported.

Historically, sacrococcygeal teratomas present in 2 clinical patterns related to the child's age, tumor location, and likelihood of tumor malignancy. With the advent of routine prenatal ultrasound examinations, a third clinical pattern is emerging.

- Fetal tumors present during prenatal ultrasound exams, with or without maternal symptoms. SCTs found during routine exams tend to be small and partly or entirely external. The internal SCTs are not easily seen via ultrasound, unless they are large enough to reveal their presence by the abnormal position of the fetal urinary bladder and other organs, but large fetal SCTs frequently produce maternal complications which necessitate non-routine, investigative ultrasounds.
- Neonatal tumors present at birth protruding from the sacral site and are usually mature or immature teratomas.
- Among infants and young children, the tumor presents as a palpable mass in the sacropelvic region compressing the bladder or rectum. These pelvic tumors have a greater likelihood of being malignant. An early survey found that the rate of tumor malignancy was 48% for girls and 67% for boys older than 2 months at the time of sacrococcygeal tumor diagnosis, compared with a malignant tumor incidence of 7% for girls and 10% for boys younger than 2 months at the time of diagnosis. The pelvic site of the primary tumor has been reported to be an adverse prognostic factor, most likely caused by a higher rate of incomplete resection.
- In older children and adults, the tumor may be mistaken for a pilonidal sinus, or it may be found during a rectal exam or other evaluation.

== Diagnosis ==
During prenatal ultrasound, an SCT having an external component may appear as a fluid-filled cyst or a solid mass sticking out from the fetus' body. Fetal SCTs that are entirely internal may be undetected if they are small; detection (or at least suspicion) is possible when the fetal bladder is seen in an abnormal position, due to the SCT pushing other organs out of place.

At birth, the usual presentation is a visible lump or mass under the skin at the top of the buttocks crease. If not visible, it can sometimes be felt; gently prodded, it feels somewhat like a hardboiled egg. A small SCT, if it is entirely inside the body, may not present for years, until it grows large enough to cause pain, constipation and other symptoms of a large mass inside the pelvis, or until it begins to extend out of the pelvis. Even a relatively large SCT may be missed, if it is internal, because the bony pelvis conceals and protects it. Mediastinal tumors, including teratomas, are similarly concealed and protected by the rib cage.

Some SCTs are discovered when a child begins to talk at about age 2 years and complains of their bottom hurting or feeling "poopy" when they ride in a car seat.

Other tumors can occur in the sacrococcygeal and/or presacral regions and hence must be ruled out to obtain a differential diagnosis. These include extraspinal ependymoma, ependymoblastoma, neuroblastoma and rhabdomyosarcoma.

Smaller SCTs with an external component, seen in prenatal ultrasounds or at birth, often are mistaken for spina bifida. Cystic SCT and terminal myelocystocele are especially difficult to distinguish; for more accurate diagnosis, MRI has been recommended.

== Treatment ==
The preferred first treatment for SCT is complete surgical removal (i.e., complete resection) including coccygectomy. The preferred approach to a small SCT is through the perineum; a large SCT may require an additional approach through the abdomen. Resection should include the coccyx and may also include portions of the sacrum. The surgery should include reattachment of the small muscles and ligaments formerly attached to the coccyx, in effect reconstructing the posterior perineum. If not, there is an increased risk of perineal hernia later in life.

SCTs are classified morphologically according to their relative extent outside and inside the body:

- Altman type I — entirely outside, sometimes attached to the body only by a narrow stalk
- Altman type II — mostly outside
- Altman type III — mostly inside
- Altman type IV — entirely inside; this is also known as a presacral teratoma or retrorectal teratoma

The Altman type is significant in the contexts of management of labor and delivery, surgical approach, and complications of SCT. Serial ultrasound and MRI monitoring of SCTs in fetuses in utero has demonstrated that the Altman type can change over time. As the tumor grows, it can push between other organs and through the perineum to the body surface where the tumor appears as a bulge covered only by skin. Sometimes, the tumor bulge later slips back inside the perineum.

Like all teratomas, a sacrococcygeal teratoma has the potential to be malignant, and the standard of care requires long-term followup by an oncologist.

=== Management of fetal SCTs ===
Management of most fetal SCTs involves watchful waiting prior to any treatment. An often used decision tree is as follows:

- Perform detailed ultrasound exam including fetal echocardiogram and Doppler flow analysis
  - If fetal high output failure, placentomegaly, or hydrops
    - If fetus not mature, perform pregnancy termination or fetal intervention
    - Else fetus mature, perform emergency Cesarean section
  - Else no emergent problems, perform serial non-stress tests and ultrasound biophysical profiles and plan delivery, as follows
    - If emergent problems develop, return to top of decision tree
    - Else if SCT over 5–10 cm or polyhydramnios, perform early (37 weeks gestation) elective Cesarean section
    - Else SCT small and no complications, permit term spontaneous vaginal delivery

Emergent problems include maternal mirror syndrome, polyhydramnios, and preterm labor. Poor management decisions, including interventions that are either premature or delayed, can have dire consequences. A very small retrospective study of 9 babies with SCTs greater than 10 cm diameter reported slightly higher survivorship in babies remaining in utero slightly longer.

In many cases, a fetus with a small SCT (under 5 or 10 cm) may be delivered vaginally. Prior to the advent of prenatal detection and hence scheduled C-section, 90% of babies diagnosed with SCT were born full term.

=== Management of adult SCTs ===
SCTs are very rare in adults, and as a rule these tumors are benign and have extremely low potential for malignancy. This estimation of potential is based on the idea that because the tumor existed for decades prior to diagnosis, without becoming malignant, it has little or no potential to ever become malignant. For this reason, and because coccygectomy in adults has greater risks than in babies, some surgeons prefer not to remove the coccyx of adult survivors of SCT. There are case reports of good outcomes.

== See also ==
- Sacrococcygeal symphysis
