= Selective reduction =

Abortion of one or more (but not all) fetuses in a multiple pregnancy

Monoamniotic triplets, a very rare condition where the triplets share a single placenta, seen on ultrasound. Because a single placenta has difficulty supporting multiple fetuses, in such cases a selective reduction to improve the likelihood of survival for the remaining fetus or fetuses may be indicated.

Selective reduction is the practice of reducing the number of fetuses in a multiple pregnancy, such as quadruplets, to a twin or singleton pregnancy. The procedure is also called multifetal pregnancy reduction. The procedure is most commonly done to reduce the number of fetuses in a multiple pregnancy to a safe number, when the multiple pregnancy is the result of use of assisted reproductive technology; outcomes for both the mother and the babies are generally worse the higher the number of fetuses. The procedure is also used in multiple pregnancies when one of the fetuses has a serious and incurable disease, or in the case where one of the fetuses is outside the uterus, in which case it is called selective termination.

The procedure generally takes two days; the first day for testing to select which fetuses to reduce, and the 2nd day for the procedure itself, in which potassium chloride is injected into the heart of each selected fetus under the guidance of ultrasound imaging. Risks of the procedure include bleeding requiring transfusion, rupture of the uterus, retained placenta, infection, a miscarriage, and prelabor rupture of membranes. Each of these appears to be rare.

Selective reduction was developed in the mid-1980s, as people in the field of assisted reproductive technology became aware of the risks that multiple pregnancies carried for the mother and for the fetuses.

== Medical use ==
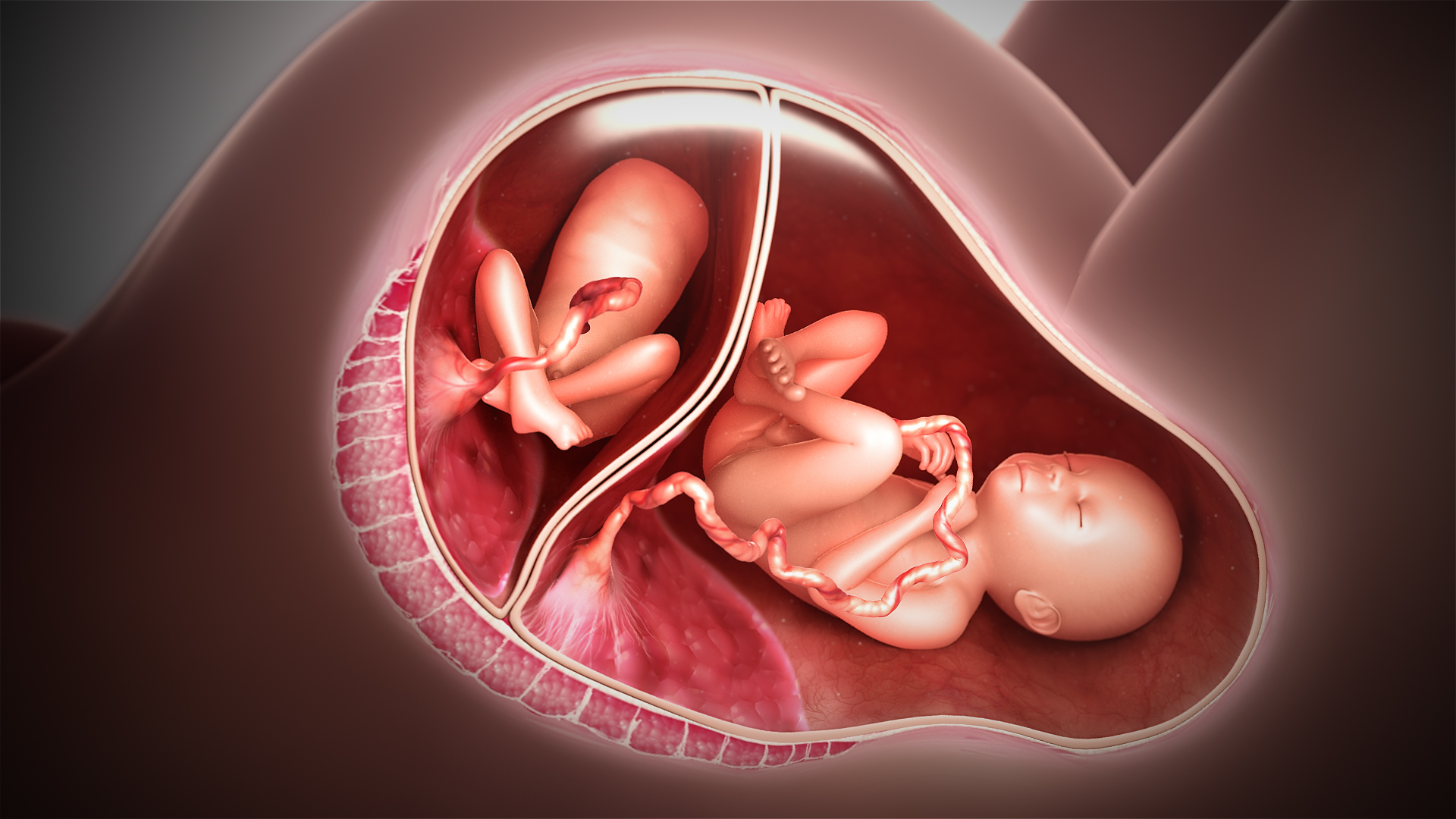
TRAP syndrome. On the left, an acardiac twin which lacks both a heart and head. On the right, the "pump twin" which supplies the acardiac twin with blood. A selective termination of the acardiac twin reduces the risk of death of the pump twin.

Selective reduction is used when a mother is carrying an unsafe or undesirable number of fetuses in a multiple pregnancy, which are common in medically assisted pregnancies. The result is a reduction in the number of fetuses to a number that is more safe for the mother and the remaining fetuses or more compatible with socio-economic constraints on the caregivers. It is also used in cases of multiple pregnancy where at least one of the fetuses is implanted outside the uterus to preserve the life of the mother and the fetus in the uterus, and when one or more of the fetuses has a serious and incurable disease. One example of is TRAP syndrome, where one fetus lacks a heart; the second twin, termed a "pump" twin therefore supplies the first twin with blood, leading to heart failure and death in the second twin in 50-75% of cases if the acardiac twin is not terminated.

While the data is weak, due to the small sizes of studies and the lack of randomized controlled trials, as of 2017 it appeared that when short term perinatal outcomes in multiple pregnancies reduced to twins are compared to those of non-reduced triplets, there were fewer deaths among the babies born to mothers who underwent reduction, the twins were born later and were less likely to be premature, and had higher birthweight. As of 2017, longterm outcomes were not well understood. A 2015 Cochrane review found no randomized clinical trials to evaluate.

=== Outcomes ===
Generally selective reduction reduces the risk of preterm birth, leading to better outcomes for both mothers and the newborns.

It appears that reduction of triplets, where each triplet is in its own placenta, to twins results in a lower risk of preterm birth and does not increase the risk of miscarriage. In triplets where two of the fetuses share a placenta and each has its own amniotic sac, it appears, with less certainty, that there is also a lower risk of preterm birth and no increase in the risk of miscarriage.

== Adverse effects ==
Risks of the procedure include bleeding requiring transfusion, rupture of the uterus, retained placenta, infection, a miscarriage, and prelabor rupture of membranes. Each of these appears to be rare.

== Procedure ==
The reduction procedure is generally carried out during the first trimester of pregnancy. The procedure often takes two days; the first day is for testing, and the procedure happens on the second day. The fetuses are evaluated, first by ultrasound, then often by testing the amniotic fluid and chorionic villus sampling; these tests help determine which fetuses are accessible for the procedure, and whether any fetuses are unhealthy. Once the specific fetuses to be reduced are identified, potassium chloride is injected into the heart of each selected fetus under the guidance of ultrasound imaging; the heart stops and the fetus dies as a result. Generally, the fetal material is reabsorbed into the woman's body.

== History ==
Selective reduction was developed in the mid-1980s, as people in the field of assisted reproductive technology (ART) became aware of the risks that multiple pregnancies carried for the mother and for the fetuses. The procedure was somewhat controversial from the beginning and drew some attention from anti-abortion activists.

A set of ethical guidelines was developed in collaboration with a bioethicist from the National Institute for Health and was published in 1988; it justified reducing pregnancies with more than three fetuses to two or three.

Over time, more and more women in the developed world sought to become pregnant when they were older, having the first child when they were over forty years old. At the same time, the number of obstetrician-gynecologists with the required expertise increased and their role in family planning evolved. These trends led to more women asking for reduction to one fetus. These requests increasingly came from women pregnant with twins due to advances in the field of ART which made massively multiple pregnancies rarer. Selective reduction of twins was very controversial at first but has gradually become more accepted. One of the authors of the 1988 guidelines updated his stance and expressed a desire for the procedure to become more available in 2014. Sex-selective reduction is widely considered to be unethical in making decisions about which fetus to keep.

== See also ==
- McCaughey septuplets
