= Monoamniotic twins =

Identical twins sharing the same amniotic sac in the womb

Various types of chorionicity and amniosity (how the baby's sac looks) in monozygotic (one egg/identical) twins as a result of when the blastocyst or embryo splits

Monoamniotic twins are identical or semi-identical twins that share the same amniotic sac within their mother's uterus. Monoamniotic twins are always monochorionic and are usually termed Monoamniotic-Monochorionic ("MoMo" or "Mono Mono") twins. They share the placenta, but have two separate umbilical cords. Monoamniotic twins develop when an embryo does not split until after formation of the amniotic sac, at about 9–13 days after fertilization. Monoamniotic triplets or other monoamniotic multiples are possible, but extremely rare. Other obscure possibilities include multiples sets where monoamniotic twins are part of a larger gestation such as triplets, quadruplets, or more.

== Occurrence ==
Monoamniotic twins are rare, with an occurrence of 1 in 35,000 to 1 in 60,000 pregnancies.

== Complications ==
The survival rate for monoamniotic twins has been shown to be as high as 81% to 95% in 2009 with aggressive fetal monitoring, although previously reported as being between 50% and 60%. Causes of mortality and morbidity include:

- Cord entanglement: The close proximity and absence of amniotic membrane separating the two umbilical cords makes it particularly easy for the twins to become entangled in each other's cords, hindering fetal movement and development. Additionally, entanglement may cause one twin to become stuck in the birth canal during labor and expulsion. Cord entanglement happens to some degree in almost every monoamniotic pregnancy.
- Cord compression: One twin may compress the other's umbilical cord, potentially stopping the flow of nutrients and blood and resulting in fetal death.
- Twin-to-twin transfusion syndrome (TTTS): One twin receives the majority of the nourishment, causing the other twin to become undernourished. TTTS is much more difficult to diagnose in monoamniotic twins than diamniotic ones, since the standard method otherwise is to compare the fluid in the sacs. Rather, TTTS diagnosis in monoamniotic twins relies on comparing the physical development of the twins.

== Diagnosis ==
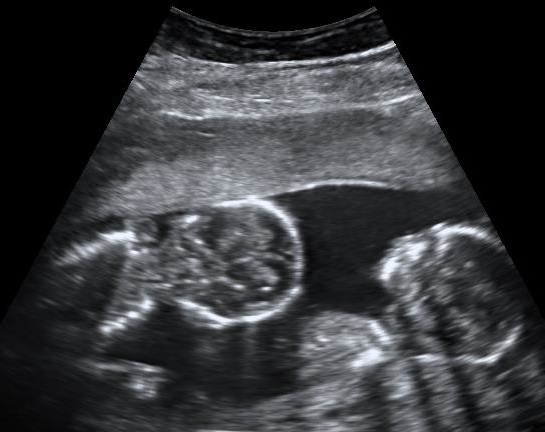
Abdominal ultrasonography of monoamniotic twins at a gestational age of 15 weeks. There is no sign of any membrane between the fetuses. A coronal plane is shown of the twin at left, and a sagittal plane of parts of the upper thorax and head is shown of the twin at right.

Ultrasound is the only way to detect monoamniotic-monochorionic twins before birth. It can show the lack of a membrane between the twins after a couple of weeks' gestation, when the membrane would be visible if present.

Further ultrasounds with high resolution doppler imaging and non-stress tests help to assess the situation and identify potential cord problems.

There is a correlation between having a single yolk sac and having a single amniotic sac. However, it is difficult to detect the number of yolk sacs, because the yolk sac disappears during embryogenesis.

Cord entanglement and compression generally progress slowly, allowing parents and medical caregivers to make decisions carefully.

== Treatment ==
Only a few treatments can give any improvements.

Sulindac has been used experimentally in some monoamniotic twins, lowering the amount of amniotic fluid and thereby inhibiting fetal movement. This is believed to lower the risk of cord entanglement and compression. However, the potential side effects of the drug have been insufficiently investigated.

Regular and aggressive fetal monitoring is recommended for cases of monoamniotic twins to look for cord entanglement beginning after viability. Many women enter inpatient care, with continuous monitoring, preferably in the care of a perinatologist, an obstetrician that specialises in high-risk pregnancies. However RCOG's guidelines cite Dias et al. in observing that cord entanglement is nearly always found in monoamniotic pregnancies and it is not clearly associated with poor outcomes, with most fetal deaths instead arising from twin reversed arterial perfusion or fetal anomaly.

The clinical guidelines of ACOG and RCOG both recommend premature delivery by cesarean section between 32 and 34 weeks. A retrospective study in 2016 argued that there is evidence vaginal delivery can be equally safe and reduce complications for some monoamniotic twins but this finding has not been incorporated into clinical guidelines.

== See also ==
- Monochorionic twins
- Identical twins
