= Monochorionic twins =

Identical twins that share the same placenta

Various types of chorionicity and amniosity (how the baby's sac looks) in monozygotic (identical) twins as a result of when the fertilized egg divides.

Monochorionic twins are monozygotic (identical) twins that share the same placenta. If the placenta is shared by more than two (see multiple birth), these are monochorionic multiples. Monochorionic twins occur in 0.3% of all pregnancies. Seventy-five percent of monozygotic twin pregnancies are monochorionic; the remaining 25% are dichorionic diamniotic. If the placenta divides, this takes place before the third day after fertilization.

== Amniocity and zygosity ==
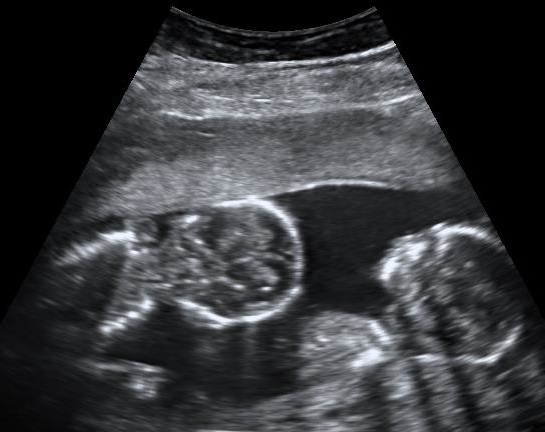
Abdominal ultrasonography of monoamniotic twins at a gestational age of 15 weeks. There is no sign of any membrane between the fetuses. A coronal plane is shown of the twin at left, and a sagittal plane of parts of the upper thorax and head is shown of the twin at right.

Monochorionic twins generally have two amniotic sacs (called Monochorionic-Diamniotic "MoDi"), but sometimes, in the case of monoamniotic twins (Monochorionic-Monoamniotic "MoMo"), they also share the same amniotic sac. Monoamniotic twins occur when the split takes place after the ninth day after fertilization. Monoamniotic twins are always monozygotic (identical twins). Monochorionic-Diamniotic twins are always monozygotic.

== Diagnosis ==
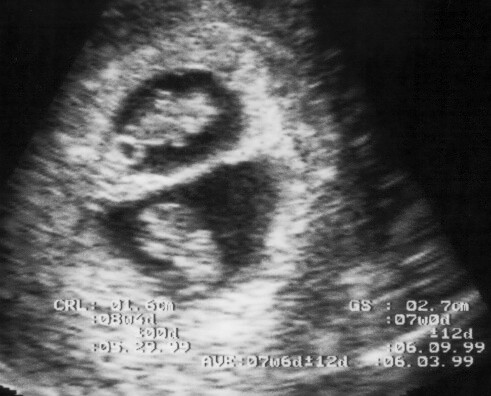
λ Sign in 8 week pregnancy

By performing an obstetric ultrasound at a gestational age of 10–14 weeks, monochorionic-diamniotic twins are discerned from dichorionic twins. The presence of a "T-sign" at the inter-twin membrane-placental junction is indicative of monochorionic-diamniotic twins (that is, the junction between the inter-twin membrane and the external rim forms a right angle), whereas dichorionic twins present with a "lambda (λ) sign" (that is, the chorion forms a wedge-shaped protrusion into the inter-twin space, creating a rather curved junction). The "lambda sign" is also called the "twin peak sign". At ultrasound at a gestational age of 16–20 weeks, the "lambda sign" is indicative of dichorionicity but its absence does not exclude it.

In contrast, the placentas may be overlapping for dichorionic twins, making it hard to distinguish them, making it difficult to discern mono- or dichorionic twins on solely the appearance of the placentas on ultrasound.

== Complications ==
In addition to a shared placenta, monochorionic twins also have their circulatory systems intermingled in random and unpredictable circulatory anastomoses. This can cause disproportionate blood supply, resulting in twin-to-twin transfusion syndrome (TTTS) in 20% of MoDi pregnancies. This is the main complication of monochorionic twins.

The 80% of MoDi pregnancies without TTTS still have high rates of birth weight discordance, fetal growth restriction, prematurity and resultant cesarean section deliveries. One twin may also fail to develop a proper heart and become dependent on the pumping activity of the other twin's heart, resulting in twin reversed arterial perfusion. If one twin dies in utero, blood accumulates in that twin's body, causing exsanguination of the remaining twin.

In the case of monoamniotic twins the risk of complications is substantially higher because of additional potential umbilical cord entanglement and compression. However, the perinatal mortality of monochorionic diamniotic twins is fairly low.

== See also ==
- Twin reversed arterial perfusion
