= Coccygectomy =

Surgical removal of the coccyx

- Specialty: Surgical oncology

Coccygectomy is a surgical procedure in which the coccyx or tailbone is removed. It is considered a required treatment for sacrococcygeal teratoma and other germ cell tumors arising from the coccyx. Coccygectomy is the treatment of last resort for coccydynia (coccyx pain) which has failed to respond to nonsurgical treatment. Non surgical treatments include use of seat cushions, external or internal manipulation and massage of the coccyx and the attached muscles, medications given by local injections under fluoroscopic guidance, and medications by mouth.

To remove the coccyx, an incision is made from the tip of the coccyx to its joint with the sacrum. The coccyx is cut away from the surrounding tissues, cut off at the joint with the sacrum, and removed. If the tip of the sacrum is rough, it is filed down. The wound is closed in layers.

== Complications and risks ==
As with any operation under anaesthetic, there are risks associated with general anaesthesia itself. An additional possible complication of coccygectomy is infection at the surgical site, due to the site's proximity to the anus, leading to contamination by bacteria from the patient's feces. An analysis of 24 studies of coccygectomy (covering 702 patients) reported that 19 studies (covering 493 patients) reported the post-surgery infection rate, while the other five studies gave incomplete information. Among the patients in the 19 studies with full information, the infection rate was 12%. In most cases the infection was superficial, but 4% of operations caused an infection that required repeat surgery to treat the infection. However, the use of prophylactic antibiotics, preoperative rectal enema, closure of the wound in two layers and use of a topical skin adhesive have been shown to reduce the rate of infection to 0%.

In adults who undergo coccygectomy, one rare complication is a subsequent perineal hernia or coccygeal hernia. In these hernias, bowel or other pelvic contents bulge downward and out of the pelvis through a weakened pelvic floor. This complication has not been reported in persons who underwent coccygectomy while a baby or child. A milder version of hernia is when someone just has prolapse (sagging) of the pelvic floor. To repair these hernias, a variety of surgical techniques have been described.

== Success rates ==
The coccygectomy operation had a poor reputation in the past, and some doctors still advise that the surgery should be avoided. However current data from clinical trials reports success rates of 50 up to 90%, a percentage that rises to 80-90% in patients that are considered to be 'good candidates' for this kind of surgery. A study that was published in 2001 covering a total of 702 patients found good or excellent results in 83% of cases.

== See also ==
- Rump (croup)
- Docking (animal)
- Docking (dog)
- Coccyx
- List of surgeries by type
