= Twin anemia-polycythemia sequence =

- Other names: TAPS
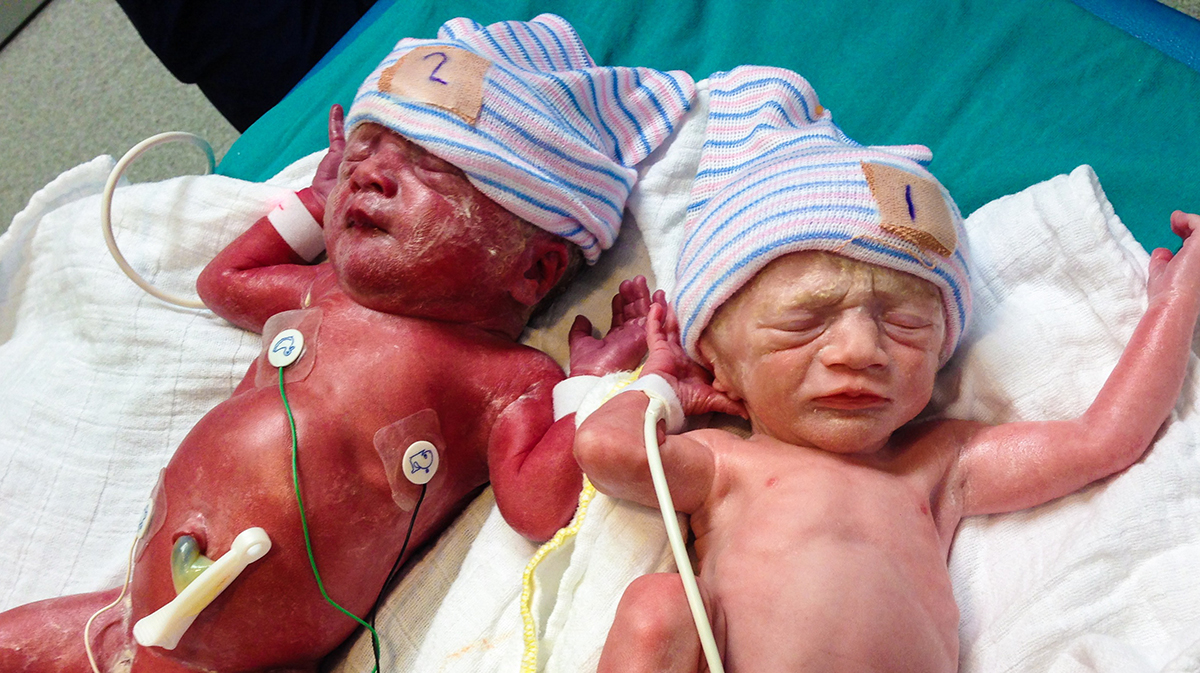
- Photo of twins with twin anemia-polycythemia sequence color difference
- Specialty: Obstetrics

Twin anemia-polycythemia sequence (TAPS) is a chronic type of unbalanced fetal transfusion in monochorionic twins that results in polycythemia in the TAPS recipient and anemia in the TAPS donor due to tiny placental anastomoses. Post-laser TAPS and spontaneous TAPS are the two forms of TAPS. Unlike twin-to-twin transfusion syndrome, which arises when twin oligohydramnios polyhydramnios sequence (TOPS) is present, TAPS develops in its absence.

== Signs and symptoms ==
A pale, anemic donor and a plethoric, polycythemic recipient make up the traditional clinical picture of TAPS.

In 29% of spontaneous TAPS twins and 23% of post-laser TAPS twins, severe fetal growth restriction is present.

== Causes ==
The cause of TAPS is slow and persistent unbalanced feto-fetal transfusion through tiny placental anastomoses, which progressively results in highly discordant hemoglobin levels. This causes the recipient twin to become polycythemic and the donor twin to become anemic.

== Mechanism ==
There are very few, tiny arteriovenous vascular anastomoses present in TAPS placentas. This distinct angiography is the foundation of the pathogenesis of TAPS. A slow transfusion of blood from the donor to the recipient is made possible by the few tiny anastomoses, which eventually cause very disparate hemoglobin levels. It's unclear if hormonal dysfunction may also contribute to the onset of TAPS.

== Diagnosis ==
Doppler ultrasound abnormalities demonstrating an increased peak systolic velocity in the middle cerebral arteries (MCAPSV) in the donor twin and a decreased MCA-PSV in the recipient twin can be used to make an antenatal diagnosis of TAPS. The presence of polycythemia in the recipient and (chronic) anemia in the donor, along with characteristic placental angioarchitecture as determined by injection with colored dye, are the basis for the postnatal diagnosis of TAPS.

=== Classification ===
Antenatal twin anemia-polycythemia sequence classification.
Antenatal stage	Results of a Doppler ultrasound scan
Stage 1	MCA-PSV donor >1.5 MoM and MCA-PSV recipient <1.0 MoM, without other signs of fetal compromise
Stage 2	MCA-PSV donor >1.7 MoM and MCA-PSV recipient <0.8 MoM, without other signs of fetal compromise
Stage 3	As stage 1 or 2, with cardiac compromise of donor, defined as critically abnormal flow. (Note: Critically abnormal Doppler is defined as pulsatile flow in the umbilical vein, absent or reversed end-diastolic flow in the umbilical artery, increased pulsatility index, or reversed flow in the ductus veinosus.)
Stage 4	Hydrops of donor.
Stage 5	Intrauterine demise of one or both fetuses preceded by TAPS

Postnatal TAPS classification.
Postnatal stage	Intertwin hemoglobin difference, g/dl
Stage 1	>8.0
Stage 2	>11.0
Stage 3	>14.0
Stage 4	>17.0
Stage 5	>20.0

== Prevention ==
The rate of residual anastomoses can be decreased to prevent postlaser TAPS. The "Solomon technique," an alternate method of laser surgery, may help lower the possibility of omitting a tiny anastomosis during the procedure.

== Treatment ==
Weekly ultrasound monitoring, which includes a full staging Doppler examination with the MCA-PSV, is part of the expectant management protocol. The recent onset of ultrasound abnormalities may require an increase in the surveillance frequency. When TAPS patients present in the first or early second trimester, this approach is preferred because many of these patients may resolve or remain clinically stable. Expectant care can be continued with the aim of achieving a late preterm delivery in stable cases that do not advance past stage 2. It is necessary to take into account alternate management options if TAPS is accelerating.

Treatments that are temporary include intrauterine blood transfusion of the anemic donor twin or exchange transfusions, which remove blood from the recipient twin and then transfusion of the donor.

Treating TAPS with fetal laser coagulation of vascular anastomoses is the only potentially effective modality.

== Outlook ==
In the TAPS Registry cohort, 11% of post-laser TAPS twins and 5% of spontaneous TAPS twins experienced spontaneous fetal death.

== Epidemiology ==
Postlaser TAPS can occur in 2–13% of cases, depending on the definitions and criteria applied. The range of incidence for spontaneous TAPS is 3–5%.

== See also ==
- Twin-to-twin transfusion syndrome
- Monochorionic twins
