= Mirror syndrome =

- Other names: Triple edema, Ballantyne syndrome
- Specialty: OBGYN

Mirror syndrome, triple edema or Ballantyne syndrome is a rare disorder affecting pregnant women. It describes the unusual association of fetal and placental hydrops with maternal preeclampsia.

The name "mirror syndrome" refers to the similarity between maternal edema and fetal hydrops. It was first described in 1892 by John William Ballantyne.

== Signs and symptoms ==
Ballantyne syndrome has several characteristics:

- edema, always a key feature
- albuminuria of the mother, usually mild
- preeclampsia, unusual

The fetal symptoms are related to fluid retention, including ascites and polyhydramnios. Fetal hydrops suggests the presence of an important and probably fatal fetal pathology.

It can be associated with parvovirus B19 infection and with twin-to-twin transfusion syndrome.

== Causes ==
The etiology may be any of the variety of obstetric problems that range from immunological disorders, including Rh-isoimmunization, to fetal infections, metabolic disorders, and fetal malformations. Ballantyne syndrome can result from the maternal reaction to a fetus that has hemoglobin Barts disease due to inherited double alpha thalassemia trait (alpha thalassemia major) from both parents.

== Pathogenesis ==
The etiopathogenetic mechanism of Ballantyne syndrome remains unknown.

== Diagnosis ==
Although the exact etiopathogenetic mechanism of Ballantyne syndrome remains unknown, several authors have reported raised uric acid levels, anemia, and low hematocrit without hemolysis.

=== Differential diagnosis ===
The problem of distinguishing (or not) between Ballantyne syndrome and preeclampsia is reflected in the diversity of terminology used and in the debate that surrounds the subject. It seems much more likely that an etiology of severe fetal hydrops may cause Ballantyne syndrome when the fetal status greatly worsens and that the syndrome is only a manifestation of the extreme severity of the fetus-placental pathology. Platelet count, aspartate transaminase, alanine transaminase, and haptoglobin are usually unaffected and may be used to distinguish mirror syndrome from HELLP syndrome.

== Treatment ==
In most cases, Ballantyne syndrome causes fetal or neonatal death. In contrast, maternal involvement is limited at the most to preeclampsia.
