= Perineal hernia =

Type of hernia

Perineum in humans
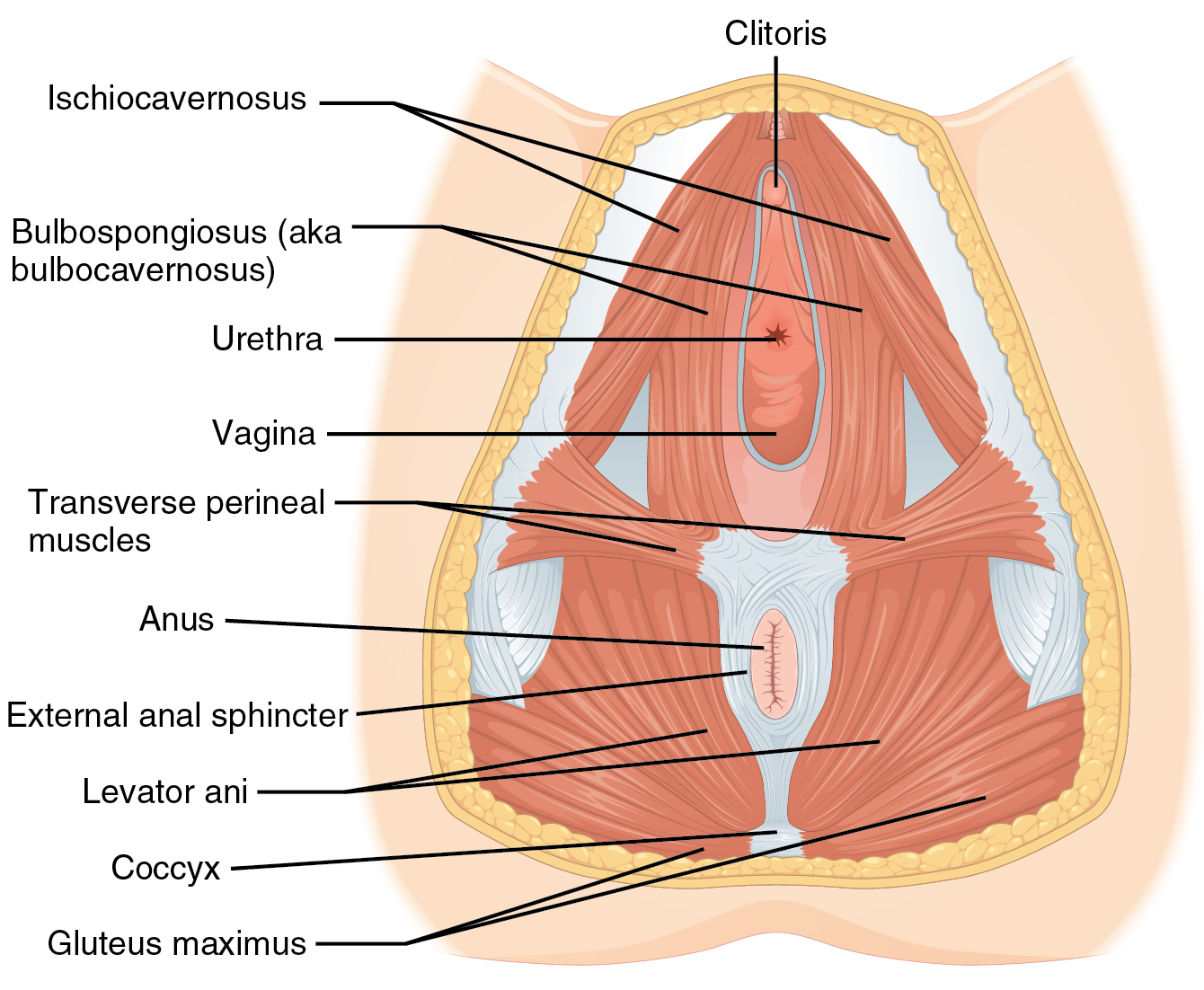
- The muscles of the female perineum

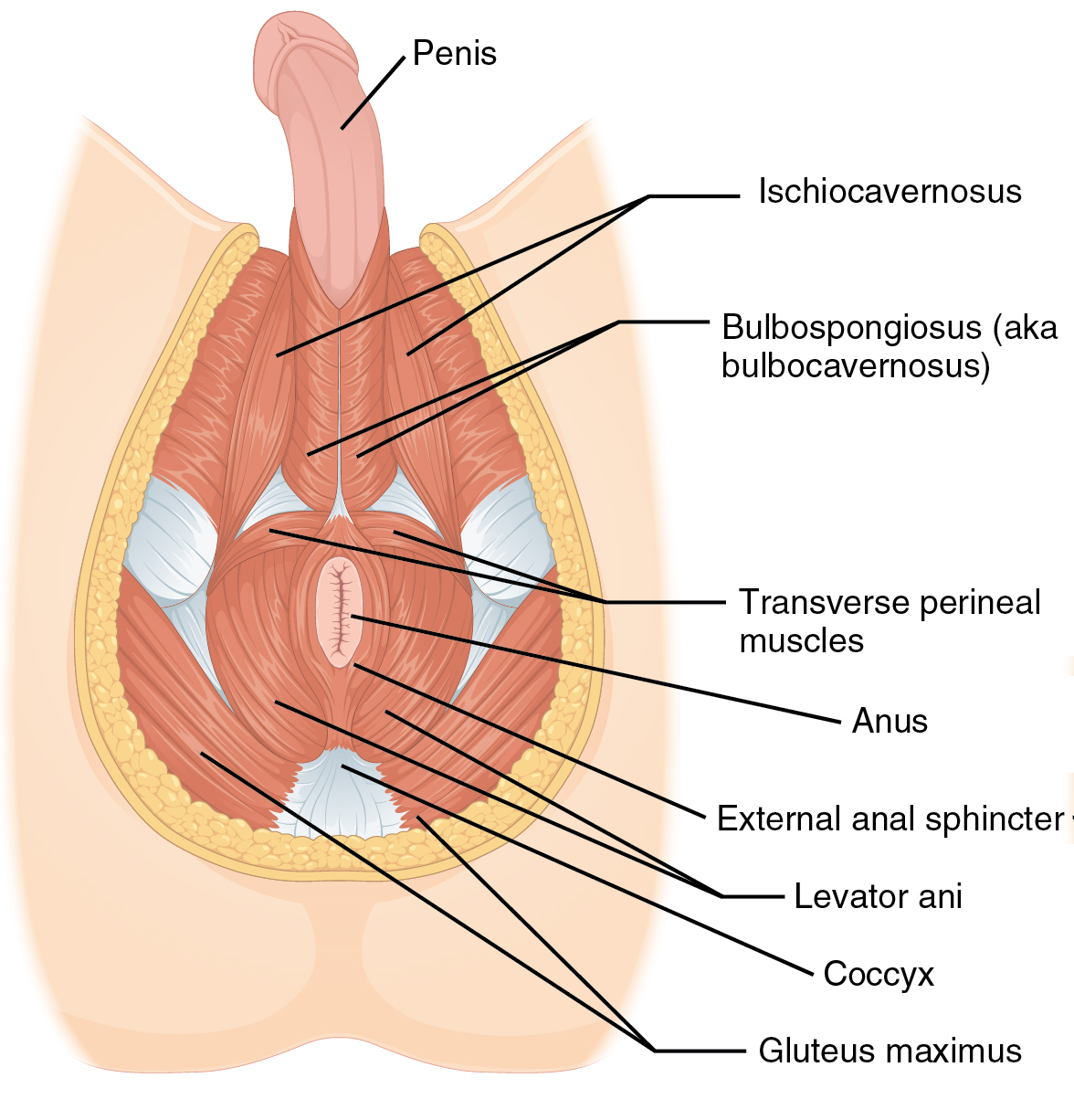
- The muscles of the male perineum

Perineal hernia is a hernia involving the perineum (pelvic floor). The hernia may contain fluid, fat, any part of the intestine, the rectum, or the bladder. It is known to occur in humans, dogs, and other mammals, and often appears as a sudden swelling to one side (sometimes both sides) of the anus.

A common cause of perineal hernia is surgery involving the perineum. Perineal hernia can be caused also by excessive straining to defecate. Atrophy of the levator ani muscle and disease of the pudendal nerve may also contribute to a perineal hernia.

== In humans ==
In humans, a major cause of perineal hernia is perineal surgery without adequate reconstruction. In some cases, particularly surgeries to remove the coccyx and distal sacrum, adequate reconstruction is very difficult to achieve. The posterior perineum is a preferred point of access for surgery in the pelvic cavity, particularly in the presacral space. Surgeries here include repair of rectal prolapse and anterior meningocele, radical perineal prostatectomy, removal of tumors including sacrococcygeal teratoma, and coccygectomy. Perineal hernia is a common complication of coccygectomy in adults, but not in infants and children (see coccygectomy).

The standard surgical technique for repair of perineal hernia uses a prosthetic mesh, but this technique has a high rate of failure due to insufficient anchoring. Promising techniques to reduce the rate of failure include an orthopedic anchoring system, a gluteus maximus muscle flap, an acellular human dermis graft, and an acellular pig collagen graft.

== In dogs and cats ==
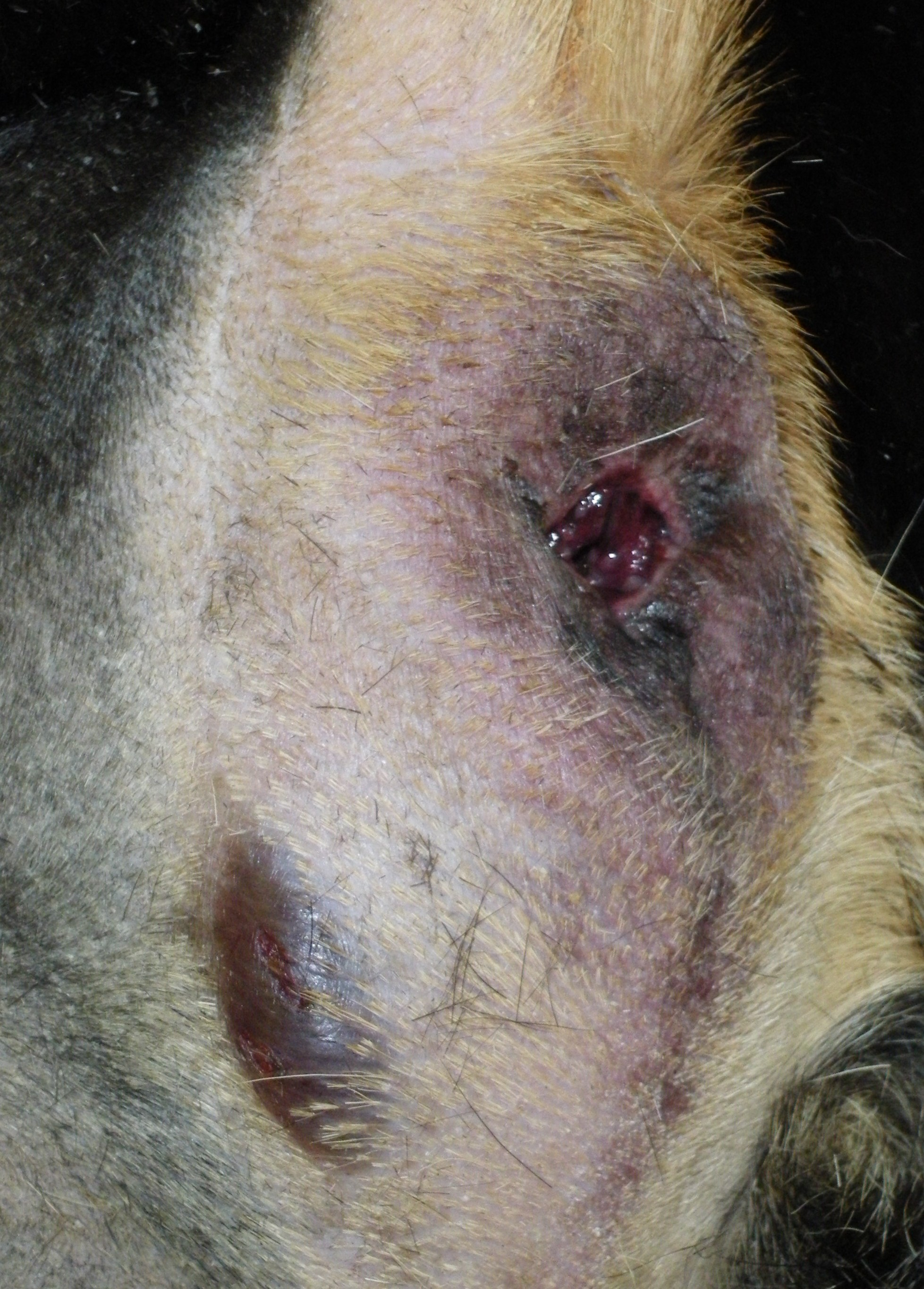
Advanced perineal hernia on the left side in a dog. The overlying skin is already blueish.

In dogs, perineal hernia usually is found on the right side. Most cases are in older intact (not neutered) male dogs (93 percent in one study). Breeds that may be at risk include Welsh Corgis, Boxers, Australian Kelpies, Boston Terriers, Collies, Dachshunds, Old English Sheepdogs, and Pekingese. Perineal hernias are rare in female dogs and uncommon in cats.

Dogs with benign prostatic hyperplasia have been found to have increased relaxin levels and suspected subsequent weakening of the pelvic diaphragm. In cats, perineal hernias are seen most commonly following perineal urethrostomy surgery or secondary to megacolon. Medical treatment consists of treatment of the underlying disease, enemas, and stool softeners. Because only about 20 percent of cases treated medically are free of symptoms, surgery is often necessary. Recurrence is common with or without surgery.

Several surgeries have been described for perineal hernias in dogs. The current standard involves transposition of the internal obturator muscle. This technique has a lower recurrence and complication rate than traditional hernia repair. A new technique uses porcine small intestinal submucosa as a biomaterial to help repair the defect. This is can also be done in combination with internal obturator muscle transposition, especially when that muscle is weak.
