= Multiples Illuminated: A Collection of Stories and Advice from Parents of Twins, Triplets and More =

2016 book edited by Megan Woolsey and Alison Lee

- Author: Megan Woolsey and Alison Lee
- Language: English
- Publisher: Multiples Illuminated
- Publication date: 2016
- Media type: Print
- ISBN: 978-0-9968335-0-9
- Followed by: Multiples Illuminated: Life with Twins and Triplets, the Toddler to Tween Years

Multiples Illuminated: A Collection of Stories and Advice from Parents of Twins, Triplets and More is a collection of personal essays by parents of twins, triplets, and larger multiple birth groups. The collection responded to a relative lack of guides for parents of multiple-birth babies.

== Contents ==
Essays in the collection are grouped under the following themes: "infertility and trying to conceive", "pregnancy", "labor and delivery", "neonatal intensive care unit (NICU)", and "the first years". The collection's authors (all mothers or, in one case, a father) are Angie Kinghorn, Alison Lee, Jared Bond, Shelley Stolaroff Segal, Janine Kovac, Susan Moldaw, Ellen Nordberg, Allie Capo-Burdick, Kirsten Gant, Shanna Silva, Briton Underwood, Melanie Sweeney, Janet McNally, Lexi Rohner, Erika Sigurdson, MeiMei Fox, Eileen C. Manion, Megan Woolsey, Becki Melchione, Jackie Pick, Allie Smith, Amy Paturel; the collection opens with a foreword by Susan Pinsky.

While most essays are personal memoirs, each section begins with an essay focusing on practical advice regarding the relevant stage of parenting twins. For example, the first chapter, by Megan Woolsey, discusses her own experience of fertility treatments, including practical advice for readers on "surviving fertility."

The book also contains writing prompts to help parents reflect on their experiences.

== Reception ==
In the assessment of Publishers Weekly, "each story is short and sweet, replete with helpful information and examples of the ways in which parents have coped"; Issa M. Lewis found that "with many backgrounds, professions, and storytelling styles represented, readers are sure to find essays that resonate with their own feelings before, during, and after pregnancy". Sarah W. Bartlett's assessment was that

the particular genius of this collection of stories is that, while serving as (excellent) guide for parents of multiples, it doubles as sheer delightful reading for anyone who has raised or is raising any number of children. [...] Each section offers first-hand accounts of terror and triumph, both tender and humorous; as well as practical guides from what to expect to supplies needed/how to obtain them.

Joe Rawlinson concluded that "you'll see the good, bad, and the ugly. Some of their stories will scare you. 'What if that happens to my twins?!' But the good news is that despite the challenges, these parents found a way through the hard times and you will too".
