= Retained placenta =

All or part of the placenta remaining in the uterus during the 3rd stage of labor

- Other names: Retained products of conception
- Specialty: Obstetrics and gynaecology

Retained placenta is a condition in which all or part of the placenta or membranes remain in the uterus during the third stage of labour. Retained placenta can be broadly divided into:

- failed separation of the placenta from the uterine lining
- placenta separated from the uterine lining but retained within the uterus

A retained placenta is commonly a cause of postpartum haemorrhage, both primary and secondary.

Retained placenta is generally defined as a placenta that has not undergone placental expulsion within 30 minutes of the baby's birth, where the third stage of labor has been managed actively.

== Signs and symptoms ==
Risks of retained placenta include hemorrhage and infection. After the placenta is delivered, the uterus should contract to close off all the blood vessels inside the uterus. If the placenta only partially separates, the uterus cannot contract properly, so the blood vessels inside will continue to bleed. A retained placenta thereby leads to hemorrhage.

== Management ==
Drugs, such as intraumbilical or intravenous oxytocin, are often used in the management of placental retention. It is useful ensuring the bladder is empty. However, ergometrine should not be given as it causes tonic uterine contractions which may delay placental expulsion. Controlled umbilical cord traction has been recommended as a second alternative after more than 30 minutes have passed after stimulation of uterine contractions, provided the uterus is contracted. Manual extraction may be required if cord traction also fails, or if heavy ongoing bleeding occurs. There is currently uncertainty about the effectiveness of anaesthesia or analgesia for manual extraction, in terms of pain and the risk of postpartum haemorrhage. Very rarely, a curettage is necessary to ensure that no remnants of the placenta remain (in rare conditions with very adherent placenta, such as a placenta accreta).

However, in birth centers and attended home birth environments, it is common for licensed care providers to wait for the placenta's birth up to 2 hours in some instances.

== Other animals ==
Retention of fetal membranes (afterbirth) is observed more frequently in cattle than in other animals. In a normal condition, a cow's placenta is expelled within 12 hours after calving.
