= Nuchal cord =

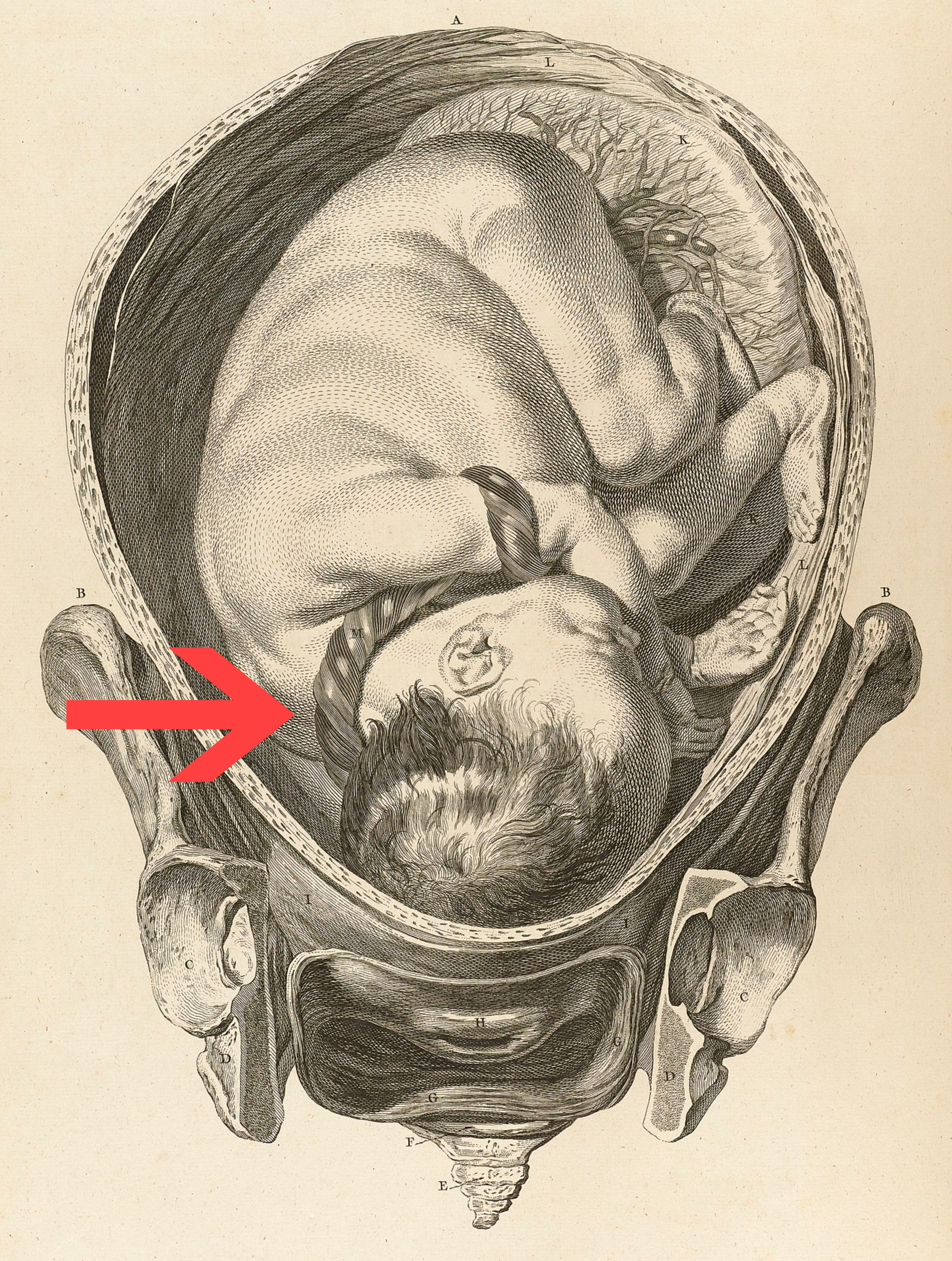
- Baby in the uterus with umbilical cord wrapped around its neck and arm
- Pronunciation: /ˈnʲu.kəl/
- Specialty: Obstetrics, pediatrics
- Symptoms: Duskiness of face, facial petechia, bleeding in the whites of the eye
- Complications: Meconium, respiratory distress, anemia, stillbirth
- Diagnostic method: Suspect based on in the babies heart rate during labor, ultrasound
- Differential diagnosis: Birth asphyxia
- Treatment: Unwrapping the cord during delivery or if this is not possible clamping and cutting the cord
- Prognosis: Usually favorable
- Frequency: 25% of deliveries

A nuchal cord is a condition in which the umbilical cord becomes wrapped around a fetus's neck. Symptoms present in the baby shortly after birth from a prior nuchal cord may include duskiness of face, facial petechia, and bleeding in the whites of the eye. Complications can include meconium, respiratory distress, anemia, and stillbirth. Multiple wraps are associated with greater risk.

The diagnosis may be suspected if there is a decrease in the baby's heart rate during delivery. Nuchal cords are typically checked for by running the finger over the baby's neck once the head has delivered. Ultrasound may pick up the condition before labor.

If detected during delivery, management includes trying to unwrap the cord or if this is not possible clamping and cutting the cord. Delivery can typically take place as normal and outcomes are generally good. Rarely long term brain damage or cerebral palsy may occur. Nuchal cords occur in about a quarter of deliveries. The condition has been described at least as early as 300 BC by Hippocrates.

== Signs and symptoms ==
Symptoms of a prior nuchal cord shortly after birth in the baby may include duskiness of face, facial petechia, and bleeding in the whites of the eye. Complications can include meconium, respiratory disease, anemia, and still birth.

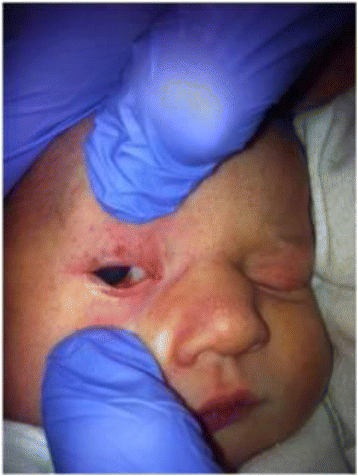
Petechiae and subconjunctival bleeding due to tight nuchal cord

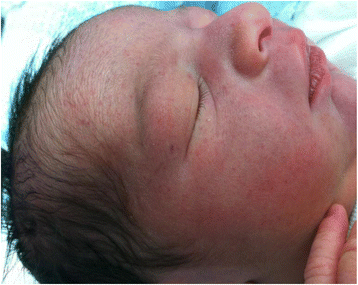
Petechiae on face due to tight nuchal cord

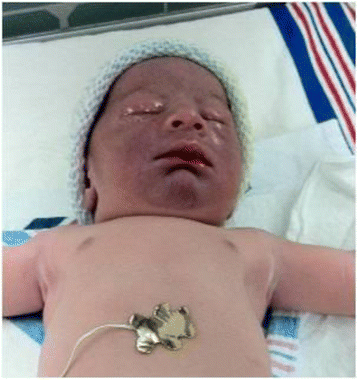
Facial duskiness due to tight nuchal cord

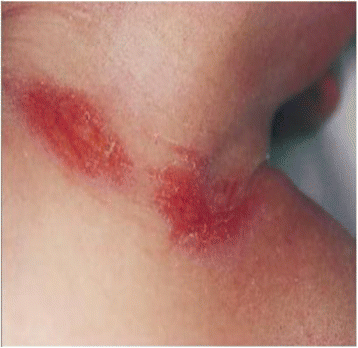
Abrasion from a nuchal cord

== Diagnosis ==
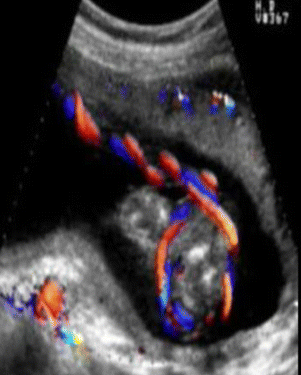
Doppler ultrasound showing a nuchal cord

In 1962, J. Selwyn Crawford MD from the British Research Council defined a nuchal cord as one that is wrapped 360 degrees around the fetal neck. Crawford commented "It is all the more remarkable, therefore, that little work has been done. to analyze its effects during labor and delivery". To date, there is no prospective case control double-blind study looking at nuchal cords and observational studies vary in opinion as to the degree of poor outcomes. Also not included in these studies is which umbilical cord form (of the 8 different possible structures) was considered a nuchal cord.

Ultrasound diagnosis of a cord around the neck was first described in 1982. “Coils occur in about 25% of cases and ordinarily do no harm, but occasionally they may be so tight that constriction of the umbilical vessels and consequent hypoxia result.” Williams Obstetrics 16th Edition, has only one single sentence in the entire textbook regarding cords around the neck. By contrast, the First Edition of the Encyclopædia Britannica from 1770 had 20 pages of information about Umbilical Cord Pathology with drawings of Umbilical Cord Entanglement. The Royal College of Obstetricians and Gynaecologists has these images on its brochure. There are currently three recent texts on ultrasonography which demonstrate the ability of ultrasound to identify umbilical cord issues with reliability as of 2009.

A study published in 2004 was done to establish the sensitivity of ultrasound in the diagnosis of a nuchal cord. Each of 289 women, induced the same day, underwent a transabdominal ultrasound scan with an Aloka 1700 ultrasound machine with a 3.5 MHz abdominal probe, using gray-scale and color Doppler imaging immediately prior to induction of labor. Presence of the cord was sought in the transverse and sagittal plane of the neck. A nuchal cord was diagnosed if the cord was visualized lying around at least 3 of the 4 sides of the neck. A cord was actually present at delivery in 52 of the 289 women. Only 18 of the 52 cords or 35% of the nuchal cords were detected on ultrasound done immediately before delivery, and 65% of nuchal cords were not detected. Of the 237 cases where there was no cord at delivery, ultrasound had false positive results, i.e. diagnosed a cord in 44 of the 237 cases (19%) in which there was no cord present at all. In this study, ultrasound was only 35% accurate at finding a single loop, and only 60% accurate at detecting a nuchal cord wrapped multiple times around the neck.

In no study was it possible by ultrasound to distinguish between a loose or a tight cord, although at least 3 attempted to do so. Peregrine concludes that ultrasound diagnosis of nuchal cords will only be useful if doctors are able to do so reliably and predict which of those fetuses are likely to have a problem. However, perinatologists routinely look for umbilical cord issues in monoamniotic twins. Studies have shown an improvement in outcomes where cord entanglement was prenatally identified in these cases. Ultrasound measurement of the velocity of flow in the cord may be useful in the management of twins and chronically growth-delayed fetuses, though this may depend on sonographer training. To date there are no ultrasound courses which teach the identification of nuchal cord to physicians or technicians. A recent review by Wilson of the American Academy of Ultrasonography Technicians recommends the documentation of umbilical cord issues.

=== Classification ===
- A "Type A" nuchal cord is wrapped around the neck but is free sliding
- A "Type B" pattern is described as a hitch which cannot be undone and ends up as a true knot.
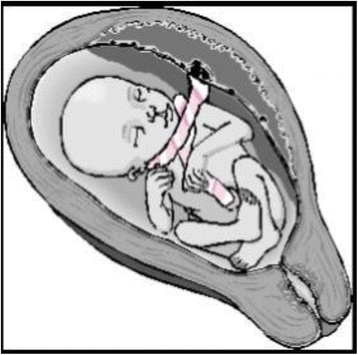
Nuchal cord - free sliding

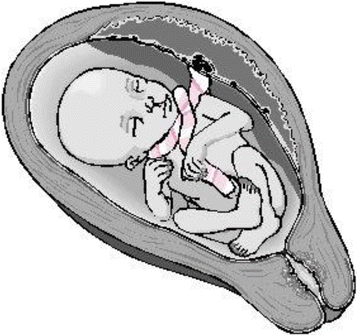
Nuchal cord - locked pattern

== Treatment ==
Management of a presenting nuchal cord should be tailored to prevent umbilical cord compression whenever possible. Techniques to preserve an intact nuchal cord depend on how tightly the cord is wrapped around the infant's neck. If the cord is loose, it can easily be slipped over the infant's head. The infant can be delivered normally and placed on maternal abdomen as desired. If the cord is too tight to go over the infant's head, the provider may be able to slip it over the infant's shoulders and deliver the body through the cord. The cord can then be unwrapped from around the baby after birth. Finally, if the cord is too tight to slip back over the shoulders, one may use the somersault maneuver to allow the body to be delivered. The birth attendant may also choose to clamp and cut the umbilical cord to allow for vaginal delivery if other methods of nuchal cord management are not feasible.

== Prognosis ==
Retrospective data of over 182,000 births, with the statistical power to determine even mild associations, suggest that a single or multiple nuchal cords at the time of delivery is not associated with adverse perinatal outcomes, is associated with higher birthweights and fewer caesarean sections in births. Although some studies have found that a tight nuchal cord is associated with short term morbidity, it is unclear whether such outcomes are actually a result of the presence of the nuchal cord itself, or as a result of clamping and cutting the cord
