= Twin-to-twin transfusion syndrome =

Unequal blood supply among multiple fetuses in the womb leading to deformity

- Specialty: Perinatology, neonatology
- Usual onset: Usually weeks 16–25 of gestation
- Types: Twin anemia–polycythemia sequence
- Treatment: Fetoscopy and laser ablation; serial amniocentesis
- Prognosis: 0–20% survival of one or all fetuses without treatment; 66–85% survival of at least one fetus with treatment, with 6–15% risk of cerebral palsy
- Frequency: Around 5–15% of identical twin pregnancies

Twin-to-twin transfusion syndrome (TTTS), also known as feto-fetal transfusion syndrome (FFTS), twin oligohydramnios-polyhydramnios sequence (TOPS) and stuck twin syndrome, is a complication of monochorionic multiple pregnancies (the most common form of identical twin pregnancy) in which there is disproportionate blood supply between the fetuses. This leads to unequal levels of amniotic fluid between each fetus and usually leads to death of the undersupplied twin and, without treatment, usually death or a range of birth defects or disabilities for a surviving twin, such as underdeveloped, damaged or missing limbs, digits or organs (including the brain), especially cerebral palsy.

The condition occurs when the vein–artery connections within the fetuses' shared placenta allow the blood flow between each fetus to become progressively imbalanced. It usually develops between week 16 and 25 of pregnancy, during peak placental growth. The cause of the developmental effects on a surviving fetus may include necrotic embolisms from a dead fetus, low blood volume due to pooling in the dead fetus or velamentous cord insertion (insertion of the umbilical cord into the chorioamniotic membranes).

The primary treatment of TTTS is fetoscopy and laser ablation of the interconnecting blood vessels to cut off the exchange of blood between the fetuses. This treatment is associated with an 85% survival rate of at least one fetus. Other treatments include periodic removal of amniotic fluid (serial amniocentesis), which is associated with a 66% survival rate of at least one fetus. Without treatment, there is an almost 100% mortality rate of one or all fetuses. Even with treatment, the condition is associated with premature birth and a risk of cerebral palsy in a surviving fetus.

Around 5–15% of identical twin fetuses will go on to develop TTTS. The condition was first described by German obstetrician Friedrich Schatz in 1875.

== Cause ==
As a result of sharing a single placenta, the blood supplies of monochorionic twin fetuses can become connected, so that they share blood circulation: although each fetus uses its own portion of the placenta, the connecting blood vessels within the placenta allow blood to pass from one twin to the other. It is thought that most monochorionic placentae have these "shared connections" that cross the placenta, with the net flow volumes being equal between them. This state is sometimes referred to as "flow balance". When the placenta has deep vein–artery connection, this can cause blood flow to become unbalanced.

Depending on the number, type and direction of the interconnecting blood vessels (anastomoses), blood can be transferred disproportionately from one twin (the "donor") to the other (the "recipient"), due to a state of "flow imbalance" imparted by new blood vessel growth across the placental "equator", the line that divides each baby's proportion of the shared placenta. This state of transfusion causes the donor twin to have decreased blood volume, retarding the donor's development and growth, and also decreased urinary output, leading to a lower than normal level of amniotic fluid (becoming oligohydramnios). The blood volume of the recipient twin is increased, which can strain the fetus's heart and eventually lead to heart failure, and also higher than normal urinary output, which can lead to excess amniotic fluid (becoming polyhydramnios). The demise of the fetus is typically a result of ischemia related to the lack of blood flow. The lack of blood flow causes bowel atresia, brain damage, and kidney failure.

TTTS usually develops during the period of peak placental growth, starting in week 16 and proceeding through week 25; after this point, the placenta's growth decelerates, essentially stopping just after week 30. While TTTS has occasionally been detected beyond this timepoint, it is thought that its occurrence beyond week 30 may be due to a placental embolism that upsets the flow balance of the shared connections between the babies. TTTS is potentially lethal to either or both twins, no matter when it is detected. However, when detected past week 25, emergency delivery may be considered to rescue the babies if the TTTS is severe.

Other than requiring a monochorionic twin (or higher multiple) pregnancy, the underlying causes of TTTS are not known. It is not known to be hereditary or genetic.

=== Effects to the surviving fetus ===
The fetal demise of one of the twins during the second trimester of a monochorionic pregnancy can result in serious complications to the surviving fetus. Complications include gangrenous limbs, hands and feet, cerebral palsy and IQ deficits, constriction rings of limbs and digits, reduced digits, skin defects, brain cysts, hydranencephaly, multicystic encephalomalacia, microencephaly, renal agenesis and bowel atresia. There are three hypotheses explaining these complications.

1. Embolic Theory: The demise of the donor twin allows necrotic tissue, presumably thrombosis-plastin like material, to pass through the vasculature of the surviving twin via the placental vessels. The necrotic tissue embolizes the surviving twin's mesenteric artery, resulting in bowel atresia, the renal artery, resulting in renal agenesis, or the peripheral arteries, resulting in limb ischemia and skin abnormalities.
2. Ischemic Theory: The demise of the donor twin creates a low-pressure state resulting in the shunting of blood into the low-resistance vascular system of the dead fetus. This state of low pressure acutely causes hypovolemia, resulting in ischemia and poor end-organ perfusion.
3. Placentation Theory: The incidence of velamentous cord insertion, an abnormal insertion of the umbilical cord into the placenta, is higher in TTTS. The exact mechanism of effect this has on fetal damage is unknown.

== Diagnosis ==
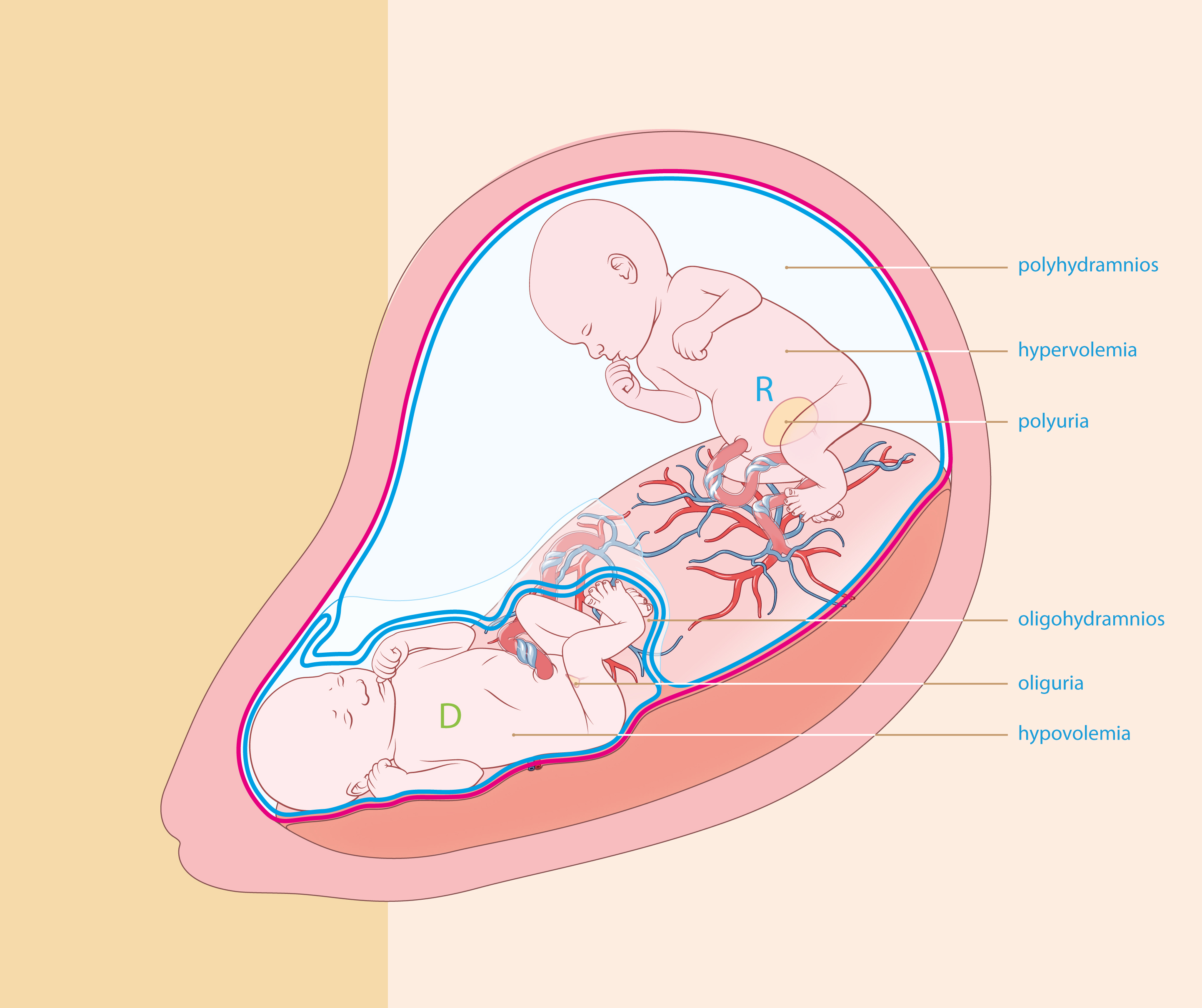
Twin-to-twin transfusion syndrome (TTTS) illustration. The donor twin (D) is confined within the amniotic sac, whereas the recipient twin (R) has freedom of movement.

=== Quintero stages ===
A staging system is commonly used to classify the severity of TTTS.

Stage I: A small amount of amniotic fluid (oligohydramnios) is found around the donor twin and a large amount of amniotic fluid (polyhydramnios) is found around the recipient twin.

Stage II: In addition to the description above, the ultrasound is not able to identify the bladder in the donor twin.

Stage III: In addition to the characteristics of Stages I and II, there is abnormal blood flow in the umbilical cords of the twins.

Stage IV: In addition to all of the above findings, the recipient twin has swelling under the skin and appears to be experiencing heart failure (fetal hydrops).

Stage V: In addition to all of the above findings, one of the twins has died. This can happen to either twin. The risk to either the donor or the recipient is roughly equal & is quite high in Stage II or higher TTTS.

The Quintero staging does not provide information about prognosis, and other staging systems have been proposed.

== Treatment ==
Various treatments exist for TTTS.

=== Non treatment ===
This is equivalent of zero intervention. It has been associated with almost 100% mortality rate of one or all fetuses. Exceptions to this include patients that are still in Stage 1 TTTS and are past 22 weeks' gestation.

=== Adjustment of amniotic fluid ===
==== Serial amniocentesis ====
This procedure involves removal of amniotic fluid periodically throughout the pregnancy under the assumption that the extra fluid in the recipient twin can cause preterm labor, perinatal mortality, or tissue damage. In the case that the fluid does not reaccumulate, the reduction of amniotic fluid stabilizes the pregnancy. Otherwise, the treatment is repeated as necessary. There is no standard procedure for how much fluid is removed each time. There is a danger that if too much fluid is removed, the recipient twin could die. This procedure is associated with a 66% survival rate of at least one fetus, with a 15% risk of cerebral palsy, and average delivery occurring at 29 weeks' gestation.

==== Septostomy, or iatrogenic disruption of the dividing membrane ====
This procedure involves the tearing of the dividing membrane between fetuses such that the amniotic fluid of both twins mixes, under the assumption that pressure is different in either amniotic sac and that its equilibration will ameliorate progression of the disease. It has not been proven that pressures are different in either amniotic sac. Use of this procedure can preclude use of other procedures as well as make difficult the monitoring of disease progression. In addition, tearing the dividing membrane has contributed to cord entanglement and demise of fetuses through physical complications.

=== Adjustment of blood supply ===
==== Laser therapy (fetoscopic laser photocoagulation) ====
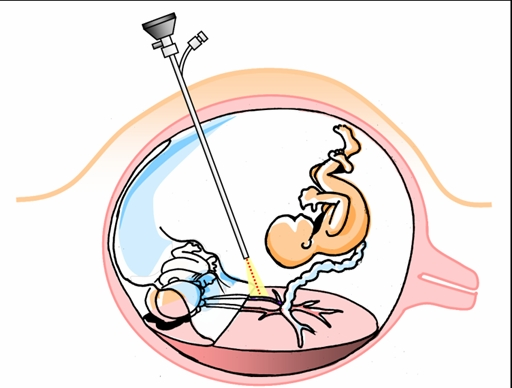
Illustration of a fetoscopy and laser ablation of connecting vessels in twin-to-twin transfusion syndrome

This procedure involves endoscopic surgery using laser to interrupt the vessels that allow exchange of blood between fetuses under the assumption that the unequal sharing of blood through these vascular communications leads to unequal levels of amniotic fluid. Each fetus remains connected to its primary source of blood and nutrition, the placenta, through the umbilical cord. This procedure is conducted once, with the exception of all vessels not having been found. The use of endoscopic instruments allows for short recovery time. This procedure has been associated with 85% survival rate of at least one fetus, with a 6–7% risk of cerebral palsy and average delivery occurring at 32–33 weeks' gestation.

In the United States, several academic medical centers perform fetoscopic laser ablation for TTTS. In 2013, a team led by Mert Ozan Bahtiyar at Yale-New Haven Hospital performed Connecticut's first in-utero laser therapy for TTTS, establishing the Yale Fetal Care Center as a regional referral center for the procedure.

Twin anemia–polycythemia sequence (TAPS) may occur after laser surgery for TTTS (post-laser form). The spontaneous form of TAPS complicates approximately 3–5% of monochorionic twin pregnancies, whereas the post-laser form occurs in 2–13% of TTTS cases. The pathogenesis of TAPS is based on the presence of few, minuscule arterio-venous (AV) placental anastomoses (diameter <1mm) allowing a slow transfusion of blood from the donor to the recipient and leading gradually to highly discordant Hb levels.

A 2014 review found that laser coagulation resulted in fewer fetal and perinatal deaths than amnioreduction and septostomy, and recommended its use for all states of TTTS.

=== Selective reduction ===
Selective termination of one of the fetuses is usually not considered until TTFS has reached either stage III or IV, and is indicated when the death of one twin is imminent, but the fetus is too premature to deliver, as the death of one twin will cause the death of the second twin due to the shared blood supply if not immediately delivered.

One procedure for selective reduction is umbilical cord occlusion. This procedure involves the ligation or otherwise occlusion of one twin's umbilical cord to interrupt the exchange of blood between the fetuses. The procedure is typically offered in cases where one of the fetuses is presumed moribund and endangering the life or health of the other twin through resultant hypotension. Use of this treatment has decreased as TTTS is identified and treated in earlier stages and with better outcomes. When used, it is associated with an 85% survival rate of the remaining fetuses with 5% risk of cerebral palsy and a 33–39 weeks of gestation at delivery.

=== Voluntary termination ===
Some women choose to have an abortion of both fetuses as the health of both fetuses is impacted by TTFS.

== Epidemiology ==
Based on recent (2005) US NCHS data, the rate of multiple births is now approximately 3.4% (4,138,349 total births, of which 139,816 were twins or higher-order multiple births). The majority of identical twins share a common (monochorionic) placenta, and of these approximately 15% go on to develop TTTS. By extrapolating the number of expected identical twins (about one-third) from annual multiple births, and the number of twins with monochorionic placentae (about two-thirds), and from these the number thought to develop TTTS (about 15%), there are at least 4,500 TTTS cases per year in the U.S. alone: 139,816 × 0.33 × 0.66 × 0.15 = 4,568 cases of TTTS per year in U.S. (involving more than 9,000 babies.) Since spontaneous pregnancy losses and terminations that occur prior to 20 weeks go uncounted by the C.D.C., this estimate of TTTS cases may be very conservative. Although infertility treatments have increased the rate of multiple birth, they have not appreciably diluted the expected incidence of identical twins. Studies show a higher rate of identical twins (up to 20 times with IVF) using these treatments versus spontaneous pregnancy rates.

One Australian study, however, noted an occurrence of only 1 in 4,170 pregnancies, or 1 in 58 twin gestations. This distinction could be partly explained by the "hidden mortality" associated with MC multifetal pregnancies—instances lost due to premature rupture of membrane (PROM) or intrauterine fetal demise before a thorough diagnosis of TTTS can be made.

== History ==
TTTS was first described by a German obstetrician, Friedrich Schatz, in 1875. Once defined by neonatal parameters—differences in birth weight and cord hemoglobin at the time of delivery—TTTS is now defined differently. Today, it is known that discordant fetal weights will most likely be a late manifestation, and fetal hemoglobin through cordocentesis is often equivalent in the twin pair even in severe TTTS.

=== In art ===
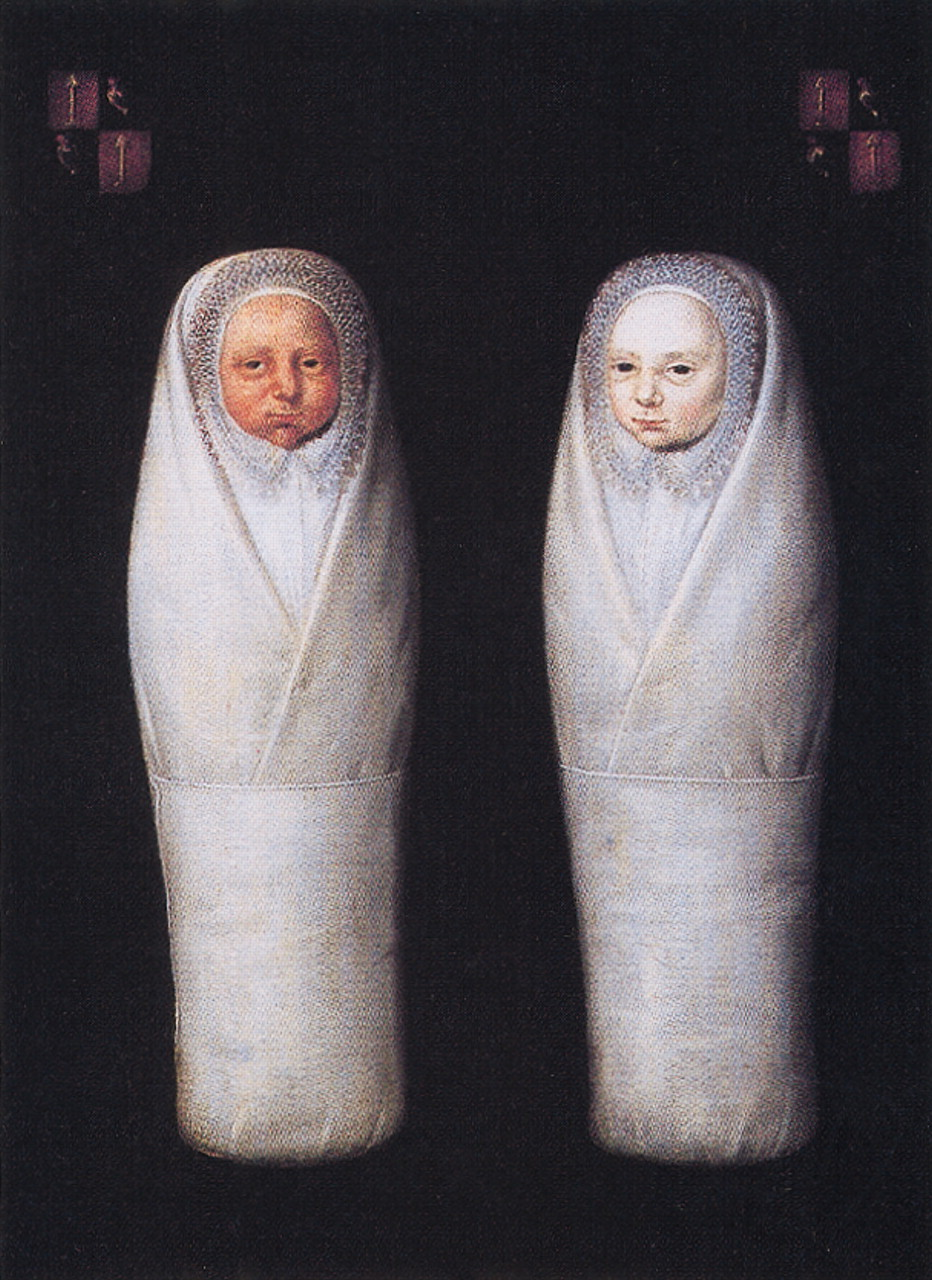
De Wikkelkinderen (The Swaddled Children), 1617, by an unknown artist, is thought to depict TTTS.

A painting known as the De Wikkelkinderen (The Swaddled Children), from 1617, is thought to represent a depiction of TTTS. The drawing shows twins that appear to be identical, but one is pale, while the other is red. Analysis of the family histories of the owners of the painting suggests that the twins did not survive to adulthood, although whether that is due to TTTS is uncertain.

== See also ==
- Twin reversed arterial perfusion (TRAP syndrome)
- Twin anemia-polycythemia sequence
- Vanishing twin
