= Twin reversed arterial perfusion =

Rare complication of monochorionic twin pregnancies

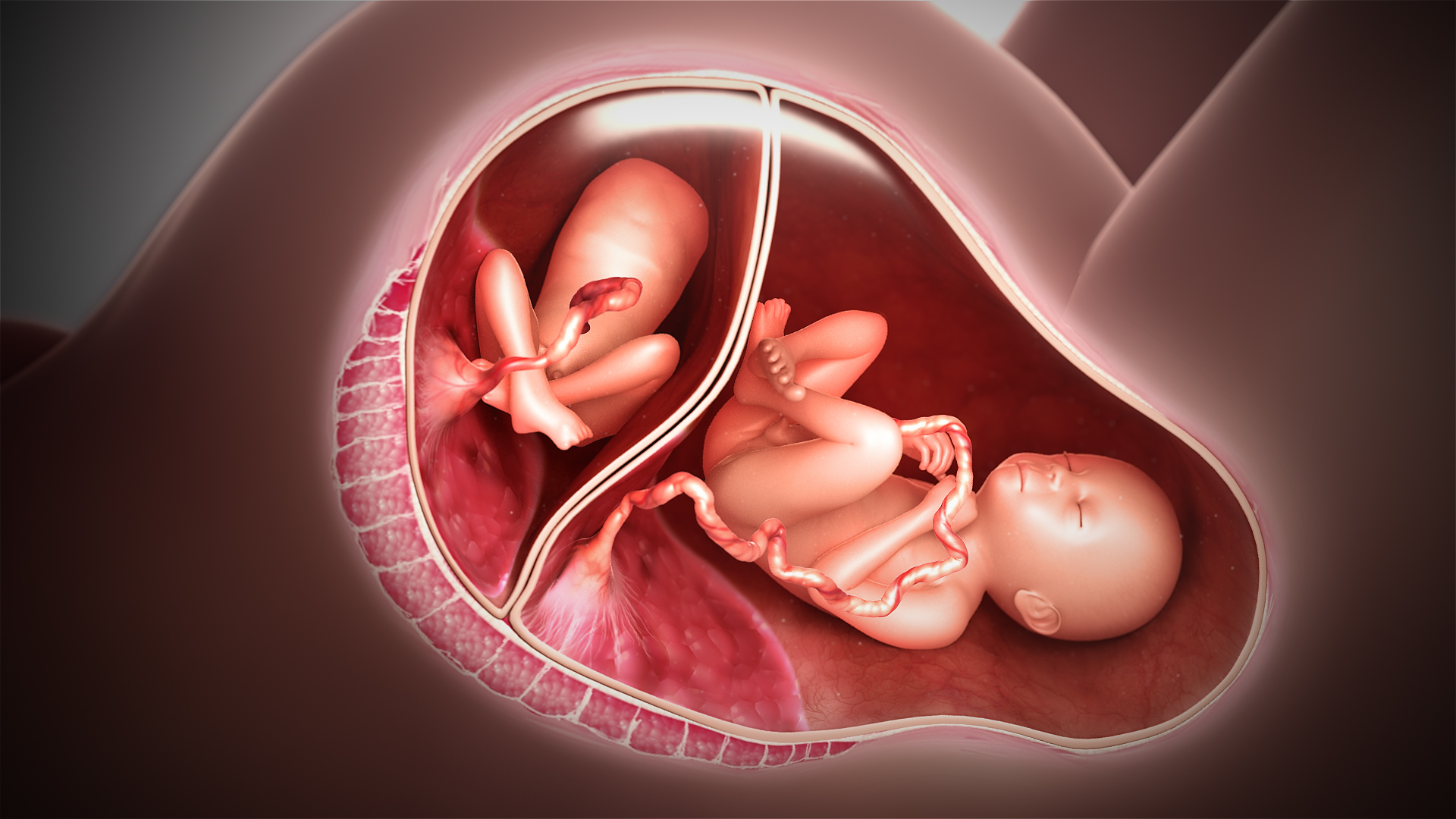
Illustration of TRAPS pregnancy. On the left, the acardiac twin. The pump twin is on the right. Selective termination of the acardiac twin can reduce the risk of death of the pump twin.

Twin reversed arterial perfusion sequence, also called TRAP sequence, TRAPS, or acardiac twinning, is a rare complication of monochorionic twin pregnancies. It is a severe variant of twin-to-twin transfusion syndrome (TTTS). In addition to the twins' blood systems being connected instead of independent, one twin, called the acardiac twin, TRAP fetus or acardius, is severely malformed. The heart is absent or deformed, hence the name "acardiac", as are the upper structures of the body. The other limbs may be partially present or missing, and internal structures of the torso are often poorly formed. The other twin is usually normal in appearance. The normal twin, called the pump twin, drives blood through both fetuses. It is called "reversed arterial perfusion" because in the acardiac twin the blood flows in a reversed direction.

TRAP sequence occurs in 1% of monochorionic twin pregnancies and 1 in 35,000 pregnancies overall.

== Acardiac twin ==
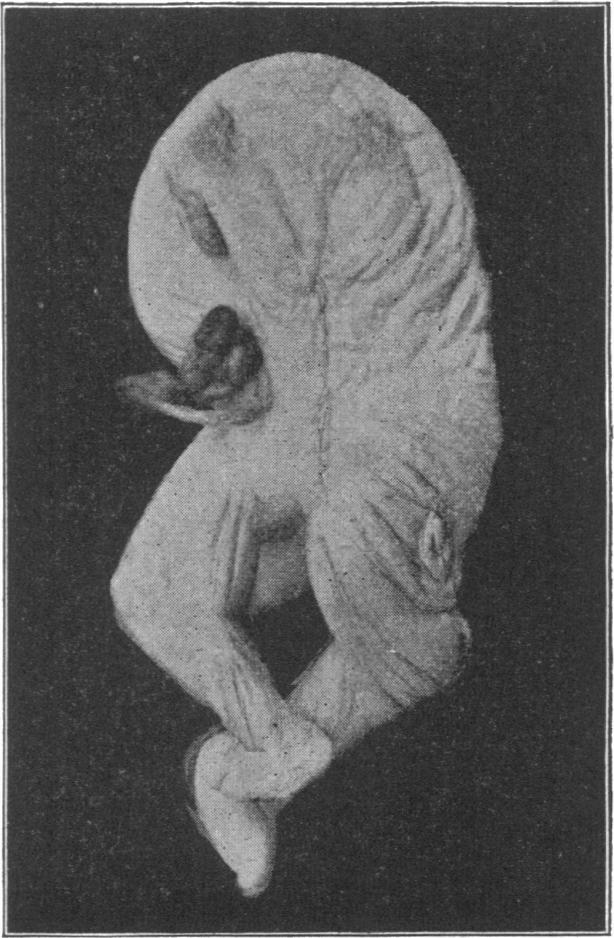
An Acardiac twin

The acardiac twin is the twin with an absent or nonfunctional heart. It is perfused by its co-twin, the pump twin, via placental anastomosis. This results in the acardiac twin being poorly developed and may cause heart failure in the pump twin. Because the acardiac twin has an absent or nonfunctional heart, it may be misdiagnosed as a stillbirth because it has no heartbeat.

== Pump twin ==
Generally, the pump twin is structurally normal, although it is smaller than normal. Due to related problems including the rapid growth of the acardiac twin, polyhydramnios, umbilical cord entanglement and congestive heart failure due to high output, there is a high mortality rate for the pump twin if left untreated. The rate of fatality depends on the relative size of the acardiac twin. If the abnormal twin is greater than 50% of the size of the pump twin, the survival rate for the pump twin is only 10%.

== Diagnosis ==
TRAP sequence can be diagnosed using obstetric ultrasound. Doppler interrogation will confirm that blood flow in the acardiac twin is in the reverse direction, entering via the umbilical cord artery and exiting through the vein.

== Treatment ==
Treatment is selective termination of the acardiac twin. If left untreated, the pump twin will die in 50–75% of cases.

After diagnosis, ultrasound and amniocentesis are used to rule out genetic abnormalities in the pump twin. A procedure may then be performed which will stop the abnormal blood flow. The acardiac twin may be selectively removed. The umbilical cord of the acardiac twin may be surgically cut, separating it from the pump twin, a procedure called fetoscopic cord occlusion. Or a radiofrequency ablation needle may be used to coagulate the blood in the acardiac twin's umbilical cord. This last procedure is the least invasive. These procedures greatly increase the survival chances of the pump twin to about 80%.

The pump twin will be monitored for signs of heart failure with echocardiograms. If the pump twin's condition deteriorates, the obstetrician may recommend early delivery. Otherwise, the pregnancy continues normally. Vaginal birth is possible unless the fetus is in distress, although it is recommended that the delivery take place at a hospital with NICU capabilities.

== See also ==
- Conjoined twins
