= Umbilical cord compression =

Compression of umbilical cord
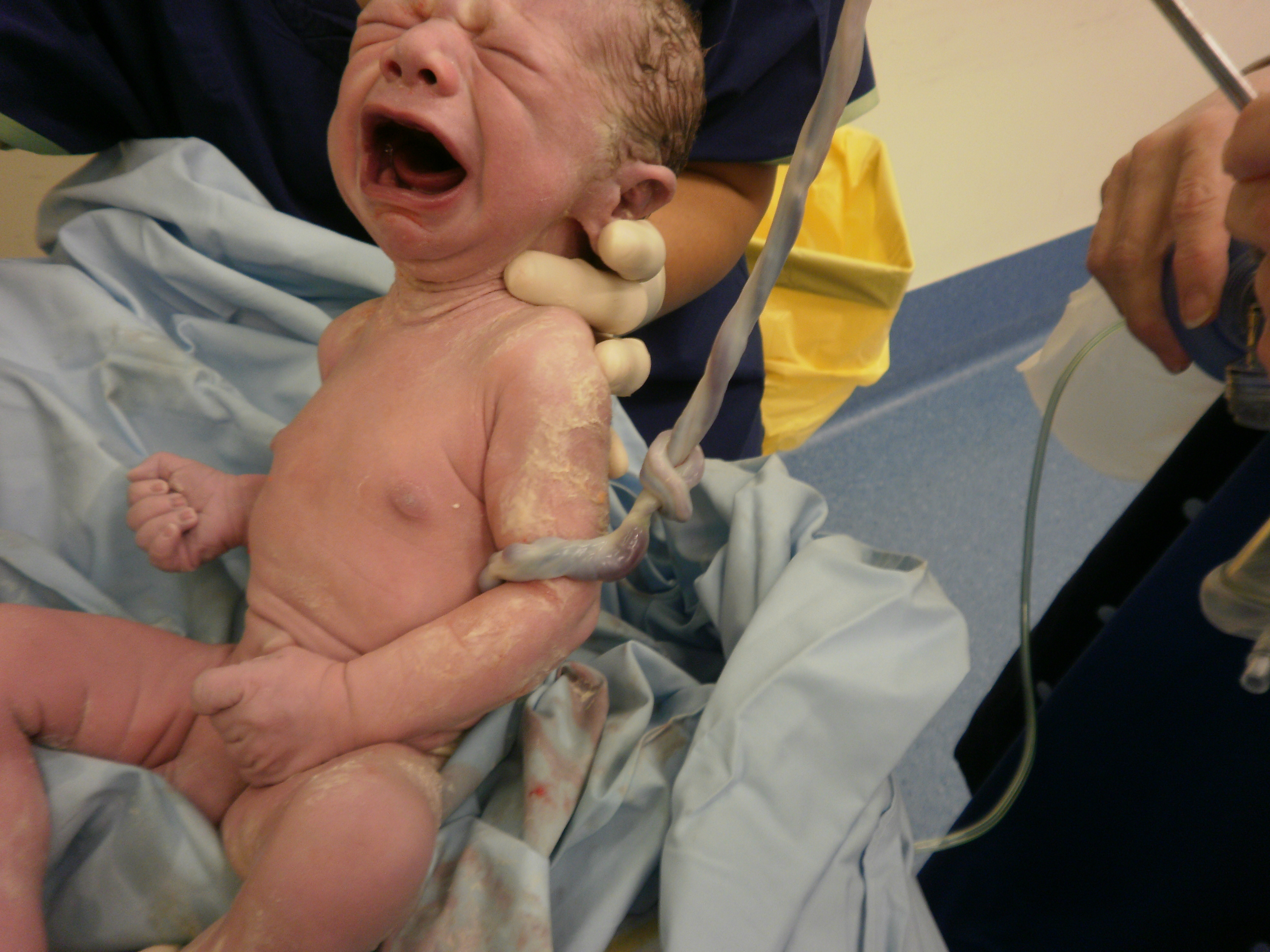
- A knotted cord on a newborn baby.
- Specialty: Obstetrics

Umbilical cord compression is the obstruction of blood flow through the umbilical cord secondary to pressure from an external object or misalignment of the cord itself. Cord compression happens in about one in 10 deliveries.

== Causes ==
- Nuchal cord, when the umbilical cord is (tightly) around the neck of the fetus
- Entanglement of the cord
- Knot in the cord
- Cord prolapse, where the umbilical cord exits the birth canal before the baby, which can cause cord compression.
- As a complication of oligohydramnios in which there is insufficient amniotic fluid
- Compression during uterine contractions in childbirth

== Diagnosis ==
On cardiotocography (CTG), umbilical cord compression can present with variable decelerations in fetal heart rate.

== Treatment ==
Umbilical cord compression may be relieved by the mother switching to another position or through maternal hydration. Secondary treatments include amnioinfusion. In persistent severe signs of fetal distress, Cesarean section may be needed.
