= Kamiel Vandenberghe =

Belgian obstetrician and gynaecologist (1940–1997)

- Born: 25 July 1940; Ypres, Belgium
- Died: 16 December 1997
- Education: KU Leuven
- Known for: Introduction of obstetric ultrasound and fetal medicine in Belgium
- Scientific career
- Fields: Obstetrics and gynaecology, fetal medicine
- Workplaces: University Hospitals Leuven; KU Leuven

Kamiel Vandenberghe (1940 – 16 December 1997) was a Belgian obstetrician and gynaecologist and an academic at the Katholieke Universiteit Leuven. He is credited with introducing obstetric and gynaecological ultrasound in Belgium and with establishing the country's first structured unit for fetal medicine. He served as president of the International Fetal Medicine and Surgery Society in 1993–1994 and took part in early experimental work on fetal surgery at Leuven.

== Early life and education ==
Vandenberghe was born in Ypres, West Flanders, in 1940. He obtained a bachelor's degree in letters and philosophy from the Katholieke Universiteit Leuven in 1961, then studied medicine at the same university, graduating cum laude in 1968. He completed specialist training in obstetrics and gynaecology in 1973.

He subsequently undertook subspecialty training in obstetric ultrasound and fetal medicine abroad, including periods in Vienna with Alfred Kratochwil, in Glasgow with Ian Donald, in London with Stuart Campbell, at Yale with John Hobbins, and in Denver with Joseph Holmes.

== Career ==
On his return to the University Hospitals Leuven, Vandenberghe introduced diagnostic ultrasound into obstetric and gynaecological practice and developed the first structured fetal medicine service in Belgium, which he headed as the Department of Ultrasound, Antenatal Diagnosis and Fetal Medicine. His clinical interests included fetal cardiology, the prenatal diagnosis of fetal malformations, and intrauterine transfusion. He was appointed senior lecturer in 1984 and associate professor in 1994, and served as a permanent member of the hospital's ethical committee.

=== Research ===
With colleagues in the Leuven departments of medical genetics and pathology, Vandenberghe co-authored the 1988 clinical delineation of Fryns syndrome, a multiple congenital anomaly syndrome, in a report of two affected siblings. He applied fetal echocardiography to the prenatal diagnosis of cardiac conditions, including a reported case of fetal cardiac tamponade caused by an intrapericardial teratoma.

From the early 1990s he supervised experimental work on fetoscopy and fetal endoscopic surgery at the KU Leuven Centre for Surgical Technologies. This included studies in animal models on fetoscopic access techniques and on tracheal occlusion for congenital diaphragmatic hernia, a line of research that preceded the Leuven fetal surgery programme later directed by Jan Deprest.

== Professional service ==
Vandenberghe founded the Flemish ultrasound society (VENEB). He was a board member of the European Federation of Societies of Ultrasound in Medicine from 1984 to 1993 and a member of its ultrasound radiation safety committee from 1990 to 1997. He was a member of the editorial boards of the European Journal of Obstetrics & Gynecology and Reproductive Biology and Fetal Diagnosis and Therapy.

== Recognition ==
The International Fetal Medicine and Surgery Society, of which Vandenberghe was the thirteenth president, established a memorial travel award in his name, the Vandenberghe–Storz Award, presented to a young investigator for the best presentation at the society's annual meeting.

== Death ==
Vandenberghe died on 16 December 1997, at the age of 57. He was survived by his wife and three children.

== Selected publications ==
- Moerman P, Fryns JP, Vandenberghe K, Devlieger H, Lauweryns JM (1988). "The syndrome of diaphragmatic hernia, abnormal face and distal limb anomalies (Fryns syndrome): report of two sibs with further delineation of this multiple congenital anomaly (MCA) syndrome". American Journal of Medical Genetics. 31 (4): 805–814. doi:10.1002/ajmg.1320310413.
- Luks FI, Deprest JA, Vandenberghe K, et al. (1994). "Fetoscopy-guided fetal endoscopy in a sheep model". Journal of the American College of Surgeons. 178 (6): 609–612.
- Tollens T, Casselman F, Devlieger H, Gewillig MH, Vandenberghe K, Lerut TE, Daenen WJ (1998). "Fetal cardiac tamponade due to an intrapericardial teratoma". Annals of Thoracic Surgery. 66 (2): 559–560. doi:10.1016/s0003-4975(98)00508-6. PMID 9725408.
- Deprest JA, Vandenberghe K, Flageole H, et al. (1998). "Tracheoscopic tracheal obstruction with a detachable balloon for congenital diaphragmatic hernia". European Journal of Obstetrics & Gynecology and Reproductive Biology. 81 (2).
