= Eduard Gratacós =

Scientist and physician (born 1965)

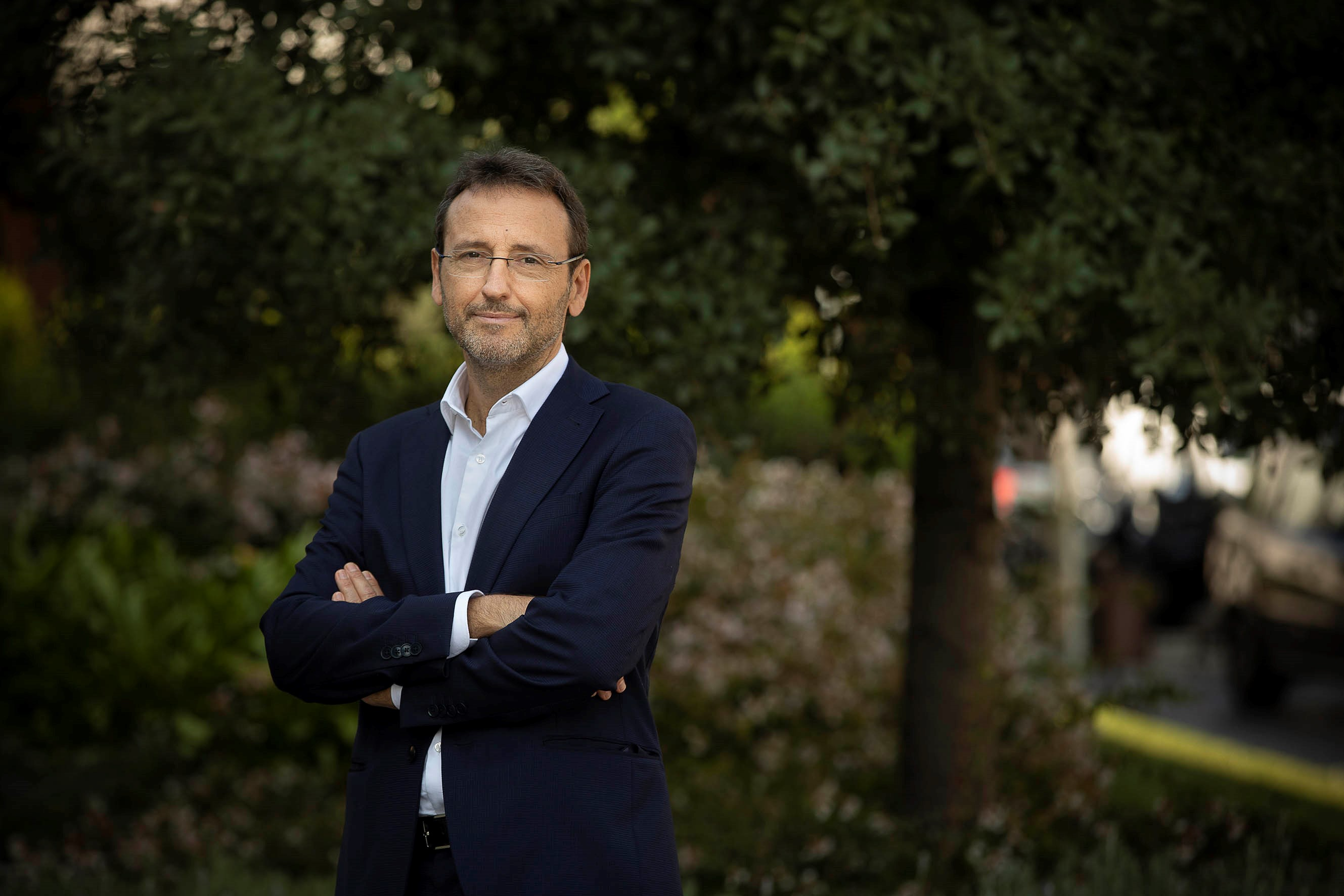
- Born: 25 December 1965; Barcelona, Spain
- Education: Hospital Clínic de Barcelona
- Known for: Physician, investigator and university professor
- Medical career
- Profession: Doctor
- Field: Obstetrics and Gynecology
- Institutions: Hospital Clínic de Barcelona (since 2005), BCNatal (since 2013), Universitat de Barcelona (since 2005), Hospital Vall d’Hebron de Barcelona (2001–2005), University of Leuven (1997–2000)

Eduard Gratacós Solsona (Barcelona, Spain, December 25, 1965) is a scientist and physician specializing in obstetrics and gynecology and an expert in maternal-fetal medicine and fetal surgery. Gratacós was one of the pioneers of the concept of the fetus as a patient and has published monographic treatises on fetal medicine. He is currently the lead in the Spanish artificial placenta project.

== Professional and academic background ==
After training as a specialist at the Hospital Clínic de Barcelona, between 1997 and 2000 he worked in Leuven (Belgium) as a post-doctorate researcher and subsequently took over the management of the Fetal Medicine Unit. At Leuven, he worked under Jan Deprest and joined the Eurofoetus group, which pioneered fetal surgery in Spain. He performed the first-ever fetal surgery in Spain in 1999 at the Vall d'Hebron University Hospital of Barcelona.

The following year, in 2000, he created the first fetal surgery and medicine unit in Spain. In 2005, he joined the Hospital Clínic as Head of the Department of Maternal and Fetal Medicine. Several years later, in 2013, he spearheaded the creation of BCNatal, a Maternal and Fetal and Neonatal Medicine Center of the Hospital Clínic and Hospital Sant Joan de Déu of Barcelona, one of the leading clinical and research centers in fetal medicine and surgery in Europe, which he currently manages.

He is also a Professor of the Universitat de Barcelona. He is the director of the Fetal Medicine research groups at IDIBAPS, at the Institut de Recerca Sant Joan de Déu and at CIBERER.

== Research ==
His main lines of research have been placental insufficiency (fetal growth restriction and preeclampsia), fetal programming and fetal surgery. He has authored more than 600 scientific articles. He has been principal investigator in more than 60 national and international projects and Director of the PhD Program in Perinatal Medicine (2012–2021) of the European Commission (Universities of Barcelona, Leuven and Lund). He has supervised more than 40 PhD theses. The main scientific contributions of his research group feature the description of a fetal growth restriction staging system, the description of a selective fetal growth restriction classification system in monochorionic pregnancy, and the demonstration that several fetal conditions lead to fetal programming at neurological and cardiovascular level, as well as the development and first application of new fetal surgery techniques in the world, tracheal occlusion for diaphragmatic hernia (together with Jan Deprest and Kypros Nicolaides) and the first fetal surgeries for fetal airway obstruction (CHAOS and laryngeal atresia). More recently, his research group has demonstrated that maternal lifestyle interventions reduce the complications of pregnancy and improve fetal neurodevelopment. He has also promoted the La Caixa Research Placenta Artificial Project (Barcelona), one of the few artificial placenta experimental projects in the world.

He is a co-inventor of 5 patents. Now, in December 2023, he has an h-index of 105.

== Teaching and Dissemination ==
He is a regular guest speaker at international congresses and has directed more than 200 national and international courses for specialists. His center has provided training in fetal medicine and surgery to more than 400 physicians from different countries. He founded Medicina Fetal Barcelona, a platform that provides training jointly with different universities. He also spearheaded the creation of iNatal, one of the benchmark Spanish-language pregnancy-related websites. He is also a co-founder of beDona, an online woman's health initiative based on functional medicine and lifestyle promotion to prevent the major health problems in all stages of a woman's life.

== Awards and Recognitions ==
He was the editor of the Fetal Diagnosis and Therapy (2008–2021) scientific journal. He has also been a board member and/or scientific chair of international societies and congresses (ISUOG, WAMP, EAPM, DIP) and an adviser in clinical and research systems in Europe, Asia and America. He has also received several national and international awards, particularly the Gold Medal of the International Society of Ultrasound in Obstetrics and Gynecology. He also merited an award in the category of Best Specialist in Obstetrics and Gynecology at the Monitor de Reputación Sanitaria (2015) and MERCO-Observatorio de Salud al Liderazgo Reputacional (2023) awards.
