= EUFI =

EUFI may refer to:

- Extrauterine fetal incubation
- EUFI, the ICAO aircraft code for Eurofighter Typhoon
