= Fetal incubator =

Fetal incubator may refer to:

- Neonatal incubator, a device used in a neonatal intensive-care unit
- Artificial womb
