= Ectogenesis =

Gestation outside an organism

Ectogenesis (from the Greek ἐκτός, "outside", and genesis) is the growth of an organism in an artificial environment, outside the body in which it would normally be found, such as the growth of an embryo or fetus outside the mother's body, or the growth of bacteria outside the body of a host. The term was coined by British scientist J. B. S. Haldane in 1924.

== Human embryos and fetuses ==
Ectogenesis of human embryos and fetuses would require an artificial uterus. An artificial uterus would have to be supplied with nutrients and oxygen from some source to nurture the fetus, as well as dispose of waste material. There would likely be a need for an interface between such a supplier, filling this function of the placenta. As a replacement organ, an artificial uterus could be used to assist women with damaged, diseased or removed uteri to allow the fetus to be conceived to term. It also has the potential to move the threshold of fetal viability to a much earlier stage of pregnancy. This would have implications for the ongoing controversy regarding human reproductive rights. Ectogenesis could also be a means by which LGBTQ, infertile, disabled, or single men and women could have genetic offspring without the use of surrogate pregnancy, and allow women to have children without going through the pregnancy cycle.

== Synthetic embryo ==
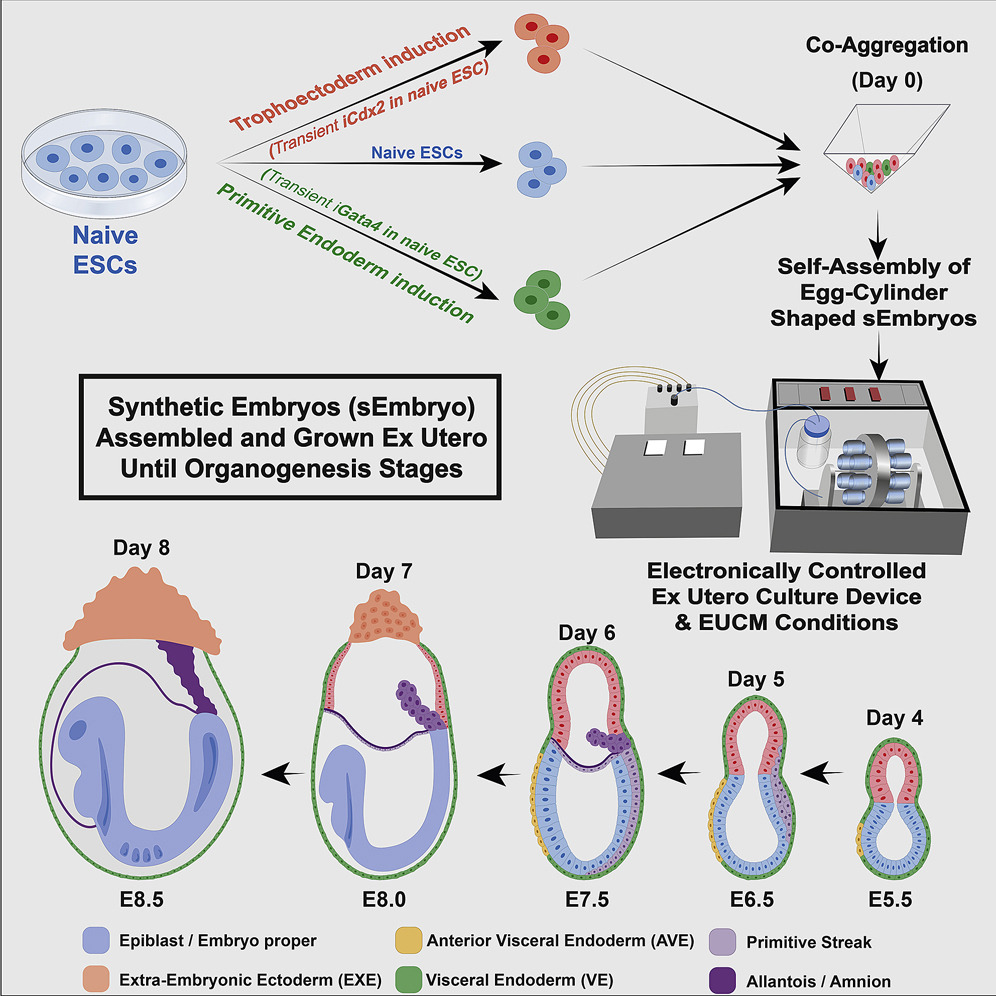
Post-gastrulation synthetic embryos generated ex utero from mouse naive embryonic stem cell

In 2022, Jacob Hanna and his team at the Weizmann Institute of Science created early "embryo-like structures'" from mice stem cells. Their research was published by Cell on 1 August 2022. The world's first synthetic embryo does not require sperm, eggs, nor fertilization, and were grown from only embryonic stem cells (ESCs) or also from stem cells other than ESCs. The structure had an intestinal tract, early brain, and a beating heart and a placenta with a yolk sac around the embryo. The researchers said it could lead to better understanding of organ and tissue development, new sources of cells and tissues for human transplantation, although human synthetic embryos are a long ways off.

Also in August 2022, a study described how University of Cambridge, alongside the same Weizmann Institute of Science scientists, created a synthetic mouse embryo with a brain and a beating heart by using stem cells (also some stem cells other than ESCs). No human eggs nor sperm were used. They showed natural-like development and some survived until day 8.5 where early organogenesis, including formation of foundations of a brain, occurs. Scientists hope it can be used to create synthetic human organs for transplantation.

The embryos grew in vitro and subsequently ex utero in an artificial womb published the year before by the Hanna team in Nature, and was used in both studies. Potential applications include "uncovering the role of different genes in birth defects or developmental disorders", gaining "direct insight into the origins of a new life", "understand[ing] why some pregnancies fail", and developing sources "of organs and tissues for people who need them". The term "synthetic embryo" in the title of the second study was later changed to the alternative term "embryo model".

On 6 September 2023, Nature published research that the Weizmann Institute team created the first complete human day 14 post-implantation embryo models, using naïve ES cells expanded in special naive conditions developed by the same team in 2021. It also uses reprogrammed genetically unmodified naïve stem cells to become any type of body tissue. Chemicals were used to coax these stem cells into becoming four types of cells found in the earliest stages of the human embryo. The mixture began assembling itself into a structure that resembles, but is not identical to, a human embryo. The embryo model (termed and abbreviated as SEM) mimics all the key structures; like that of a "textbook image" of a human day-14 embryo.

== Bioethics and gender equality ==
The development of artificial uteri and ectogenesis raises a few bioethical and legal considerations, and also has important implications for reproductive rights and the abortion debate.

Artificial uteri may expand the range of fetal viability, raising questions about the role that fetal viability plays within abortion law. For example, within severance theory, abortion rights only include the right to remove the fetus, and do not always extend to the termination of the fetus. In the abortion debate, the death of the fetus has historically been considered an unavoidable side effect rather than the primary goal of an abortion. If transferring the fetus from a woman's womb to an artificial uterus becomes possible, then the choice to terminate a pregnancy in this way could result in a living child.

There are theoretical concerns that children who develop in an artificial uterus may lack "some essential bond with their mothers that other children have", a secondary issue to woman's rights over their own body. In 1925, the year after the lecture of Haldane, Dora Russell, the wife of Bertrand, wrote her own essay claiming that ectogenesis would liberate women from a child-bearing and maternal role that kept them servile and house-bound. With ectogenesis, Russell combined feminism with scientific progress. In the 1970 book The Dialectic of Sex, feminist Shulamith Firestone wrote that differences in biological reproductive roles are a source of gender inequality. Firestone singled out pregnancy and childbirth, making the argument that an artificial womb would free "women from the tyranny of their reproductive biology." Her revolutionary plan also required the abolition of marriage and family in favor of ectogenesis. Such ectogenesis would not be a cure for infertility since in the post-revolutionary society there would be no emphasis on having a biological child.

Arathi Prasad argues in her column in The Guardian in her article "How artificial wombs will change our ideas of gender, family and equality" that "[i]t will ... give men an essential tool to have a child entirely without a woman, should they choose. It will ask us to question concepts of gender and parenthood." She furthermore argues for the benefits for same-sex couples, saying: "It might also mean that the divide between mother and father can be dispensed with: a womb outside a woman’s body would serve women, trans women and male same-sex couples equally without prejudice." It could even be a solution for women with absolute uterine infertility.

== See also ==
- Artificial uterus
- Extracorporeal procedure
- Ectopic pregnancy
- In vitro fertilization
- In vitro gametogenesis
- Postgenderism
- Tissue engineering
- Xenopregnancy
