= Iria Grande =

Spanish psychiatrist and reseaecher

Iria Grande (born 3 February 1982) is a Spanish physician who is an associate professor of psychiatry at the University of Barcelona, a psychiatrist at Hospital Clínic, and a researcher at the Institut d’Investigacions Biomèdiques August Pi i Sunyer (IDIBAPS) and Centro de Investigación Biomédica en Red de Salud Mental (CIBERSAM). She specializes in bipolar and depressive disorders and is affiliated with the Barcelona Bipolar and Depression Disorders Unit at Hospital Clínic. Since 2022, she has served as one of the councilors on the executive committee of the European College of Neuropsychopharmacology (ECNP) for the term 2022–2025.

== Education and career ==
Grande received her MD and PhD degrees and currently serves as an associate professor at the University of Barcelona. She is actively involved in various research projects as a principal investigator, focusing on suicide prevention, biomarkers (including the microbiota-gut-brain axis), functional outcomes, quality of life, machine-learning applications, and pharmacological treatments for affective disorders.

== Awards and recognition ==
In 2011, Grande received the international Lilly Young Investigator Fellowship in Bipolar Disorder Award from the International Society of Bipolar Disorder (ISBD). She was awarded the Reference Investigator Award by the Spanish Society of Biological Psychiatry in 2019. Since 2019, she has served as the secretary of the Spanish Society of Psychiatry.

== Academic contributions ==
DGrande has over 60 articles in international journals, 14 book chapters, and a book on bipolar depression. She serves as a reviewer for journals such as Molecular Psychiatry and has presented extensively at national and international conferences, including as a speaker and moderator. She is also a member (2023–26) of the program committee of the ECNP Workshop on Applied Neuroscience.
