= Immortal Dragons =

Immortal Dragons (不朽真龙) is a Singapore-based longevity investment fund founded by Boyang Wang (朢舶洋).It launched in August 2025 with about US$40 million under management, most of it contributed by Wang.

Investors, VCBeat wrote, were staying out of longevity projects that looked risky and slow, and Immortal Dragons used that opening, putting the fund into printing tissue, changing genes, and replacing a body.

== History ==
Immortal Dragons was founded by Boyang Wang. He launched the fund with US$40 million in assets under management. The fund invests in early-stage startups focused on experimental life-extension technologies, such as xenotransplantation, 3D bioprinting, gene therapy, artificial womb.

As of 2026, it has invested in California-based regenerative medicine startup R3 Bio, 3D bioprinting company Frontier Bio, and Unlimited Bio, which develops combinatorial anti-aging therapies. The fund also supports longevity outreach and education, including translations and publication of longevity-related books, a Chinese-language longevity podcast, and sponsorship of conferences and initiatives such as Vitalist Bay and ARDD 2025.

== Investment approach ==
Moving new treatments out of the laboratory, and work on the aging brain, sit on the four-part spread 36Kr described, together with gene therapy and replacement-style approaches to aging.

What 36Kr reported from the fund is that the body wears out faster than repairs can catch it, so replacing the parts that have worn out may be the more effective move.

36Kr described the fund as one of the earlier investors to take replacement seriously and to put money behind it as an organized strategy.

VCBeat called transplants and substitute tissue the part of the strategy where the fund had gone furthest and had the most finished work.

The gene-therapy money, VCBeat said, is not riding on a single product; it is aimed at getting a treatment in and at knowing later whether it worked.

Yicai was told the fund does not choose a field because it is the popular one, and that within a field it wants a regulator's path it can follow, evidence that is already sturdy, and a patient's need no other product really answers.

36Kr also reported the fund's condition that a technology has to be proven on a pressing disease, and sold under the rules, before it is aimed at aging.

VCBeat reported the founder's rule that a project has to clear a scientific bar first: ordinary supplements, he said, only show that a product and a health state travel together, while a longevity technology has to show a direct cause in trials built like ordinary medical trials.

The brain is the exception in that account: because it holds consciousness, memory, and a person's sense of who they are, and because replacing it would cross an ethical line, the fund does not use replacement there and looks for other ways to work on brain aging.

== Investments ==
By June 2026, 36Kr reported, the fund had taken stakes in more than twenty startups around the world.

Drug Target Review wrote that the fund's wish to install new tissue, rather than mend the old, lined up with what Frontier Bio's chief executive was building.

== Media coverage ==
In a November 2025 story on China's longevity business, the New York Times brought in the fund as the project of a young founder who had pursued freezing people, printing organs, and schemes to exchange a person's body for another.
