= Shell-less chick embryo culture =

Process of growing chick embryos in vitro

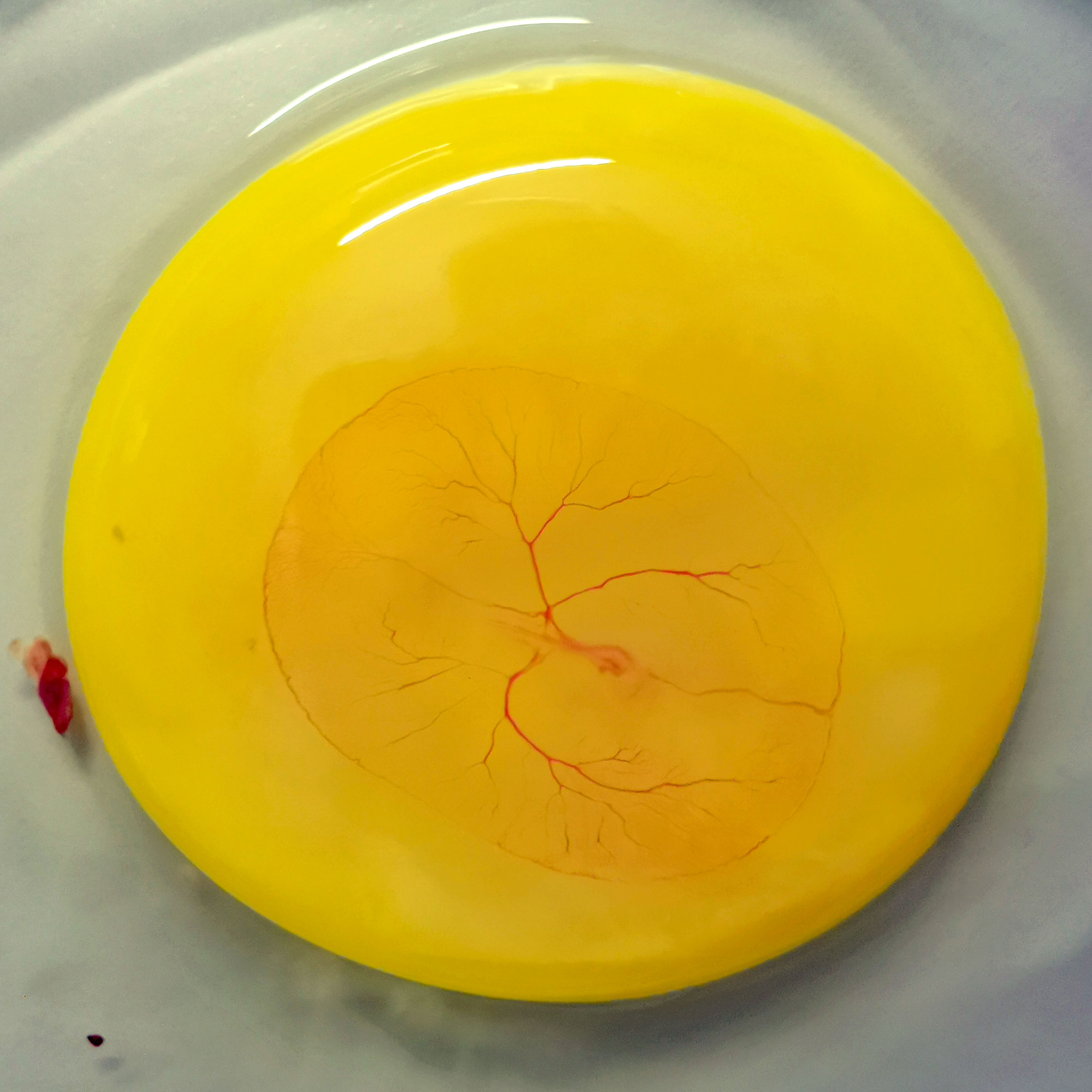
Chick embryo on yolk in a shell-less culture

Shell-less chick embryo culture is the process of growing chick embryos in vitro, without their protective egg shells, for scientific observation.

Chick embryos and other avian embryos have been used as biological models to visualize the developmental stages of embryos for education and to perform embryological manipulations. Using this technique, observations can be made, whether it is an induced-malformation caused due to the effect of teratogens or inoculations with viruses such as HIV or herpes simplex. Furthermore, methods for preservation of endangered avian species and the development of transgenic birds using surrogate egg shell culture have been created by scientists across the globe. Scientists have designed drug delivery tests in mammalian embryos to treat degenerative diseases. The technique was used in India to scrutinize glucose-induced deformities in chick embryos.

== Early history ==
The earliest example of a formal study removing chick embryo cultures from their shells to study was Aristotle in his work History of Animals in the fourth century BC, who would observe and dissect chick embryos at different development stages, noting, among other things, the formation of the heart and other organs at specific time intervals after conception. Although Aristotle did not focus on growing chick embryo cultures outside of the egg, this work is one of the first systemic and formal studies on chick embryo cultures in a shell-less setting at different development stages, as well as one of the first formal studies on embryology and animal development in general.

In the 17th century, William Harvey conducted extensive studies on embryology, particularly on chick embryos. Using the process of epigenesis, he observed and documented the stages of chick embryo development. Although he did not culture embryos in vitro, he opened eggs at various stages to observe development and drew conclusions about the circulation of blood and organ formation. His work On the Generation of Animals, published in 1651, details his studies on the development of chick embryos, including his ideas on epigenesis and the circulation of blood.

Marcello Malpighi an Italian anatomist, was one of the first scientists to use a microscope to study chick embryos. His 1672 work On the Formation of the Chick in the Egg detailed the early stages of chick development, which he documented through a series of highly detailed illustrations. His observations were not of shell-less embryos per se, but they represented some of the earliest systematic investigations into chick embryology. He illustrated and documented stages of chick embryo development using microscopy, one of the first applications of this tool in embryology.

Christian Heinrich Pander (1794–1865): Pander's studies in the early 19th century, published in 1817, focused on chick embryo development. He introduced the concept of germ layers, describing how the ectoderm, mesoderm, and endoderm formed in the chick embryo. His work laid the groundwork for later embryological studies and was influential in developmental biology. His work in 1817, Dissertatio Inauguralis quaedam de Ovi Avium atque Hominis Incubatione [Dissertation on the Incubation of the Avian Egg and Humans]. Würzburg: University of Würzburg. This dissertation introduced the concept of germ layers, describing the ectoderm, mesoderm, and endoderm in the developing chick.

Karl Ernst von Baer built on Pander's work and is often called the "father of embryology." His studies in the 1820s focused on vertebrate embryology, including that of the chick, and he formulated von Baer's laws, describing the stages of development. He did not use shell-less techniques but dissected eggs at different stages to observe development. In 1828 his work On the Developmental History of Animals: Observation and Reflection laid the foundation of comparative embryology and described developmental stages, including his renowned laws of development.

While these studies did not involve full in vitro culture of chick embryos without shells, they were significant for embryology, marking advances in observing and understanding developmental processes. True shell-less chick embryo culturing methods emerged only in the 20th century, with improved understanding of environmental needs for sustaining embryos outside the shell. These set the foundation for practical shell-less embryo culturing to emerge with the advent of modern laboratory techniques.

== Growth in vitro ==
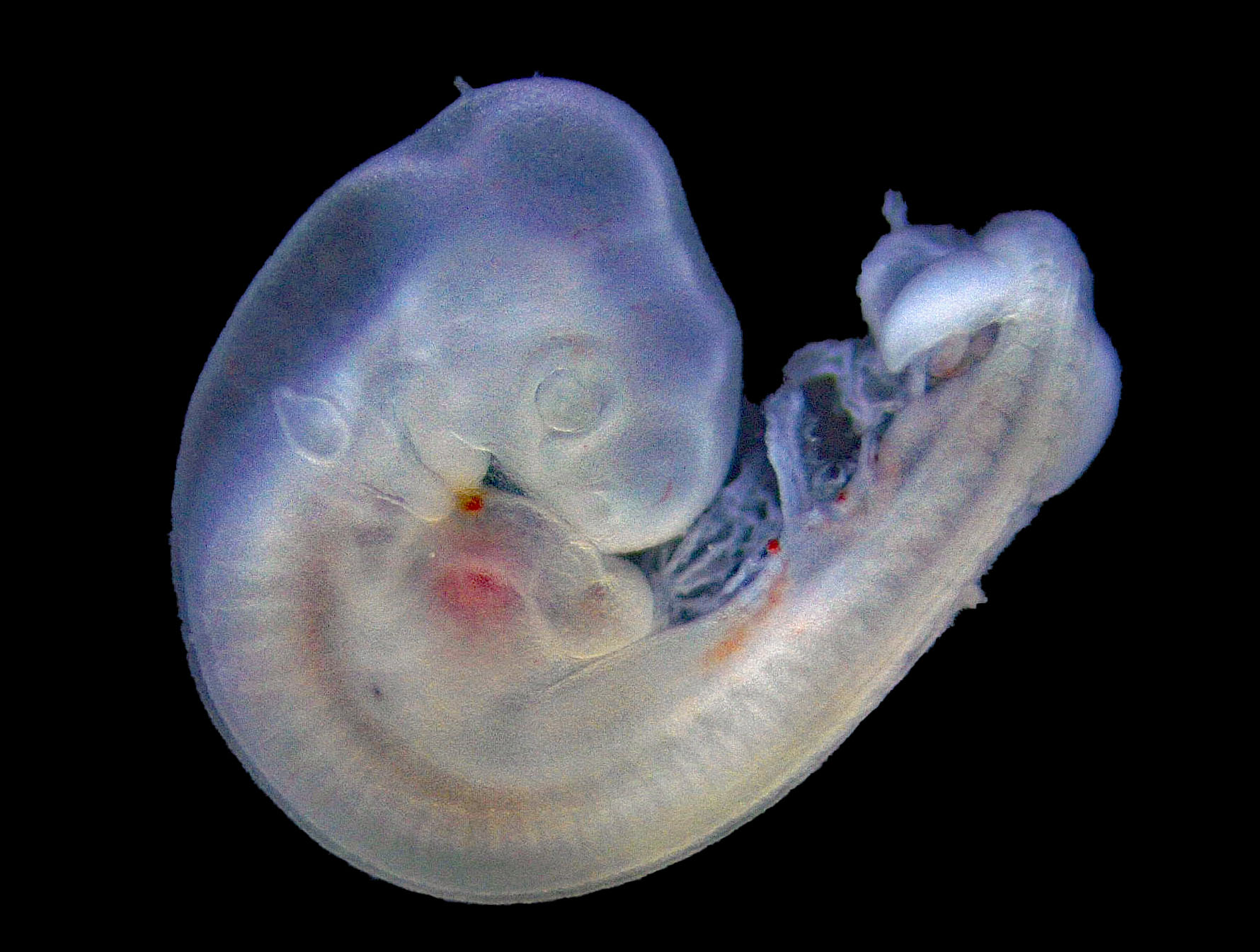
Chick embryo at three days

Attempts to grow the embryo in vitro and study the active developmental dynamics of embryogenesis outside of the shell came much with McWhorter & Whipple in 1912. Adapted from an apparatus they cited from a 1907 paper by Harrison (who was studying frog embryos in vitro), their apparatus design was adapted to a study chick embryo development at the blastoderm stage in vitro, and represented one of the earliest attempts to understand chick embryogenesis outside the egg. Their work laid a fundamental framework of the lateral translation of in vitro culture techniques from frogs to shell-less chick embryology and provided a major historical reference point.

Alexis L. Romanoff's study in 1943 makes special note of their work and attempts to increase the time embryogenesis takes place in vitro. Having previously done work on the effects of electromagnetic radiation on chick embryos, Romanoff describes a methodology that facilitated handling chick embryos outside the shell up to the 48-hour development stage. The technique involved involves rupturing the protective sac, what he called the albuminous sac, such that the yolk is submerged within the albumen, all of which is contained in a glass ring and container to help maintain the position with a beaker cover to prevent excess evaporation of egg material. Finally, all this was placed in an incubator setup with an elevated wire-mesh floor inside to ensure adequate air supply, promoting the embryo's development in an optimized environment. Romanoff's approach introduced a simplified way to study chick embryos outside the shell, focusing on environmental control to sustain growth. This technique improved early-stage embryonic observation and refined handling of the chick's developmental stages.

In 1961, Williams and Boone's work explored the challenges and limitations in maintaining the growth of chick embryos in a shell-less, or ex-ovo, environment. Specifically, they observed that chick embryo growth could be significantly inhibited under certain in vitro conditions, emphasizing the importance of factors like nutrient access, environmental stability, and structural support, which are more challenging to replicate outside the eggshell. The study contributed to understanding the specific limitations of shell-less cultures by identifying growth-inhibiting conditions. This informed Boone's pivotal paper two years later in 1963 in optimizing nutrient solutions, adjusting incubation techniques, and refining shell-less culture methods, which became crucial for subsequent studies focused on avian embryo development outside of the eggshell. That paper, along with Quisenberry and Dillon in 1962, marked the first examples of shell-less embryonic growth lasting six days.

According to a protocol written up by C. J. Fisher in 1993, she attributes another major improvement from the basement of a high school student named Bruce Dunn in 1974 which used a plastic sling and was simplified upon by Castellot et al. in 1982 by using disposable cups. As reported by C. J. Fisher,

"Early attempts to grow chick embryos outside their shells (Boone, 1963; Quisenberry and Dillon, 1962) met with limited success. Bruce Dunn (1974), a high school student working in an improvised basement laboratory, devised a method for growing chick embryos in plastic slings. Working with Boone, Ramsey and Dunn improved shell-less embryo culture methods (Dunn and Boone, 1976; Ramsey and Boone, 1972). Castellot et al. (1982) simplified the method further by substituting disposable hot cups ("chick-in-a-cup") for plastic tripods."

The specific advancements made by Ramsey and Boone's 1972 paper were further developing incubators with features aimed at controlling temperature, atmosphere, humidity, and reducing bacterial exposure. Construction was made with plywood and 2.5 cm polystyrene insulation, and plexiglass and glass viewing ports for visibility. The airflow system had air entering from the top and bottom and exited from the sides after being heated by a blower. Inside, an inner controlled chamber housed up to 36 embryos, positioned within 15 cm on all sides for optimal air circulation. Temperature control system maintained temperatures between 37.8–37.9°C using a thermistor-regulator, with real-time monitoring at the embryo level. The study set a milestone, showing that chick embryos could survive up to 18 days in opened shells within this incubator.

The specific improvements from Dunn and Boone in 1976 advanced technique for cultivating chick embryos in vitro, allowing growth from three days to 21 days of total incubation (three days in the shell followed by 18 days in culture). This improved method led to a mean survival time of 18 days in cultured embryos, reaching Hamburger–Hamilton stage 41, which corresponds to a 15-day developmental stage in natural incubation. The study details how embryos cultured in vitro showed comparable physical development (e.g., wet and dry weights, toe length) with naturally incubated embryos at corresponding stages. However, embryos cultured ex-ovo displayed some degree of growth retardation compared to in-ovo counterparts. Their method provided a way to analyze embryonic development up to later stages, enabling more complex studies on chick embryo physiology and development without the shell. The findings also highlighted potential factors contributing to in vitro growth limitations, informing further refinement of embryonic culture conditions.

In 1988 the paper by M. M. Perry describes the first successful development of a chick embryo from an early stage through to hatching entirely outside the eggshell. Perry's work introduced a complete in vitro culture system that carefully replicated the conditions inside a natural eggshell. The system included the controlled provision of oxygen, humidity, and nutrients, essential for embryo survival and growth through all developmental stages. Perry's culture system marked a breakthrough in avian embryology by achieving full-term development, and their technique paved the way for studying chick embryos under controlled conditions.

== Modern improvements ==
After the success of full-term shell-less chick embryogenesis in 1988, with the turn of the century came a turning of focus towards optimization of this in-vitro protocol through an increased focus on nutrients, like calcium, with continued attention to aeration and other environmental control. A workable technique for all stages of the full development process was established. A major convergence started to accelerate between chick embryo cultures and other embryo cultures, such as quail for example. By using chicken eggshells as vessels, Kamihira et al. in 1998 found that oxygen-enriched conditions improved viability during mid-stage culture, increasing hatchability to 30% and that adding calcium lactate, along with oxygen aeration, further raised the hatchability to 80%, addressing calcium shortages in shell-less cultures. Although this paper does use chicken embryo culture and just the chicken shell as an artificial vessel for quail embryo culture, it has been cited as a foundational study for more recent papers studying similar things in shell-less chick embryo cultures.

A greater focus on calcium and its role has begun to take place. In 2014, Tahara and Obara transferred chick embryos "to the culture vessel after 55-56 h incubation, more than 90% of embryos survived until day 17 when a polymethylpentene film was used as a culture vessel with calcium lactate and distilled water supplementations. The aeration of pure oxygen to the surviving embryos from day 17 yielded a hatchability of 57.1% (8 out of 14). Thus, we successfully achieved a high hatchability with this method in chicken embryo culture using an artificial vessel." Even papers focusing purely on optimizing an artificial environment such as a novel square glass artificial egg designs in 2015 made of Glass and exact cubes for improvements in measurement and visibility show this desire to implement calcium for better results.

Even further evidence of calcium in development from Dunn in 2023; the following year, he demonstrated for the first time unincubated eggs successfully incubated in shell-less culture for first 69–70 hours. It used a new turntable apparatus. Along with improvements to visual study and developmental dynamics using transparent films and more elaborate set ups, modern studies on shell-less chick embryo cultures remain focused on environment and nutrient optimization.

== See also ==
- Animal embryonic development
- Artificial womb
