= Interspecific pregnancy =

Pregnancy between species

Interspecific pregnancy (literally pregnancy between species, also called interspecies pregnancy or xenopregnancy) is the pregnancy involving an embryo or fetus belonging to another species than the carrier. Strictly, it excludes the situation where the fetus is a hybrid of the carrier and another species, thereby excluding the possibility that the carrier is the biological mother of the offspring. Strictly, interspecific pregnancy is also distinguished from endoparasitism, where parasite offspring grow inside the organism of another species, not necessarily in the womb.

It has no known natural occurrence; however, it can be achieved artificially by transfer of embryos of one species into the womb of another.

== Potential applications ==
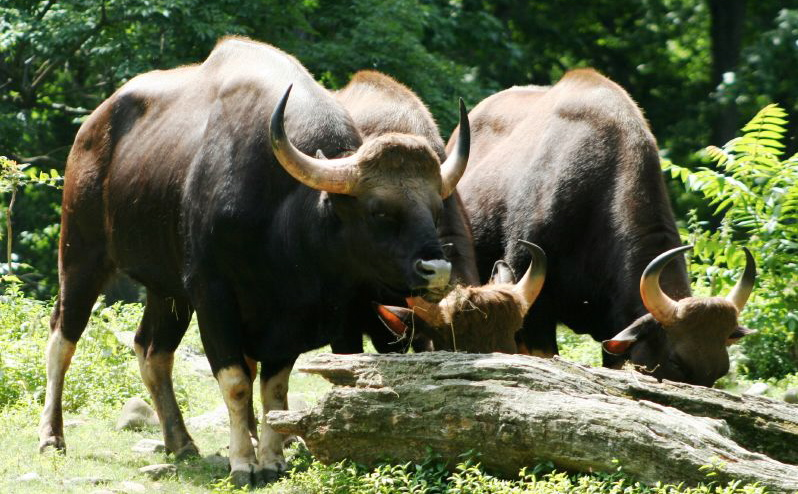
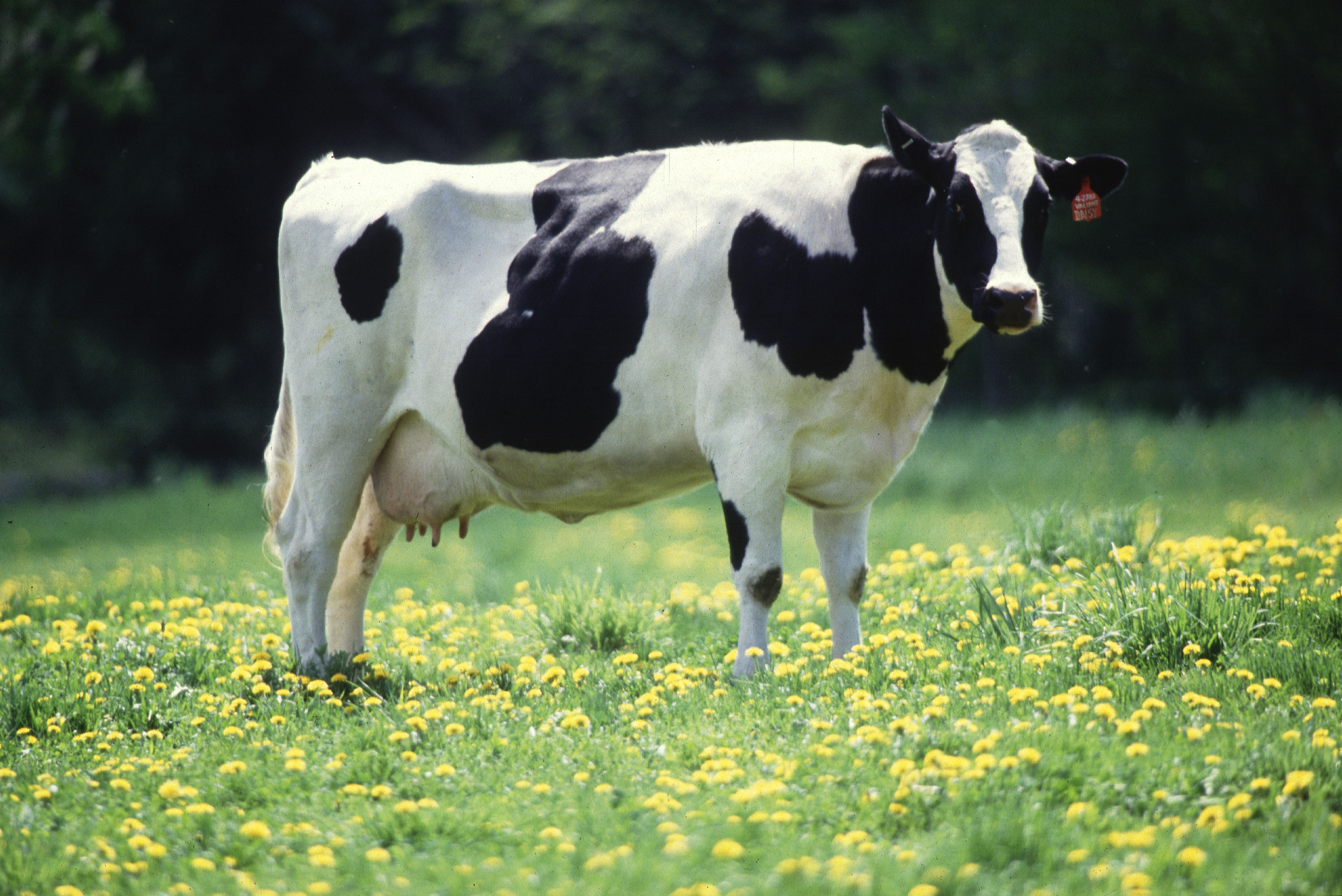
A gaur (left (Note: Pictured individuals are not the ones used in the studies, but only represent their species.)) embryo may develop to term when gestated by cattle (right), but will have severe intrauterine growth restriction.

Potential applications include carrying human fetuses to term as a potential yet ethically controversial alternative to human surrogate mothers or artificial uteri for gay male couples, mothers with damaged uteri or heterosexual couples that do not want to risk childbirth. It would also provide a sober, drug-free and nonsmoking carrier that is less expensive than human surrogates. For animals, it could be a valuable tool in preservation programs of endangered species, providing a method of ex situ conservation. It could also avail for recreation of extinct species. There have been both successful and unsuccessful examples of interspecific pregnancy in a multitude of different animals: “alpaca and lama (Godke 2001), cow (Bos taurus) and zebu (Bos indicus; Summers et al. 1983), banteng (Bos javanicus) and cow (Bos taurus; Solti et al. 2000), horse, donkey, Przewalski’s horse and Grant’s zebra (Summers et al. 1987; Allen et al. 1993), moflon (Ovis gmelina musimon) and sheep (Ovis aries; Dixon et al. 2007), Spanish ibex (Capra pyrenaica) and domestic goat (Capra hircus; Fernandez-Arias et al. 1999) and Indian desert cat (Felis silvestris) and domestic cat (Felis catus; Pope et al. 1993).”

== Examples of interspecific pregnancy ==
=== Mice: house mouse (Mus musculus) - Ryukyu mouse (Mus caroli) ===
In the case of these two species of mice embryo transfer was somewhat successful. M. caroli embryos were transferred into M. musculus mice. This produced very low rates of success. It was later discovered that development for the first nine and a half days appeared normal, but then hemorrhaging would occur. This same hemorrhaging was observed in horse-donkey interspecific pregnancy. Researchers believe that this is the body’s immunological response to the incompatibility between the two species. What is interesting though is that though embryos from M. caroli fail to develop in M. musculus females, embryos from M. musculus can survive in M. caroli females. Another important aspect of this research is the use of chimeras (an organism or tissues that contains two sets of DNA). With the use of chimeras, it was found that hemorrhaging was less likely to occur, and "postnatal tissue-specific differential growth" occurred. Research suggests that the death of these interspecific fetuses is most likely tied to maternal immune responses and “failure of local immunoregulation.”

=== Camelids: Bactrian camel (Camelus bactrianus) - dromedary camels (Camelus dromedarius) ===
Researchers at the University of Tehran transferred Bactrian camel (an Old-World endangered camelid) embryos into dromedary camels. Dromedary camels were selected for this task due to similarity to the Bactrian camel: 37 pairs of chromosomes, similar placentas, similar gestation periods, similar reproductive physiology, comparable body size, and successful examples of hybridization. Four healthy Bactrian camels were born without any complications out of the ten transferred embryos.

The researchers believe that success depends upon the binding of sperm to an oocyte. Without this successful binding, pregnancy failure is more likely to occur after interspecies embryo transmission. They also concluded that in camels, non-immunological embryo reduction does not occur when more than one embryo is in the uterus. With these findings, the researchers believe that they can save the endangered Bactrian camel and relocate them to areas where other camelids are.

== Overview ==
Experiments involving interspecific pregnancy reveal the immunological influence of failed interspecific pregnancies. These immunological influences include: trophoblast (cells formed on the outer layer of a blastocyst (which provides nutrients to an embryo), rejection due to a cell-mediated immunological response, inappropriate interactions between trophoblasts and endometrium (site where blastocysts are implanted or the uterine lining), etc.

== Causes of failure ==
Immunologically, an embryo or fetus of an interspecific pregnancy would be equivalent to xenografts rather than allografts, putting a higher demand on gestational immune tolerance in order to avoid an immune reaction toward the fetus. Some mice experiments indicate an imbalance between Th_{1} and Th_{2} helper cells with a predominance of Th_{1} cytokines. However, other mice experiments indicate that an immune response towards xeno-fetuses does not belong to classical cytotoxic T lymphocyte or natural killer cell pathways.

Interspecies compatibility is related to the type of placentation, as mothers of species having the more invasive hemochorial placentation (such as humans) must create a stronger downregulation of maternal immune responses, and are thereby more receptive to fetuses of other species, compared to those with endotheliochorial (e.g. cats and dogs) or epitheliochorial placentation (e.g. pigs, ruminants, horses, whales), where there is no contact between the maternal blood and the fetal chorion.

Other potential hazards include incompatibility of nutrition or other support system. Notably, there is a risk of inappropriate interactions between the trophoblast of the fetus and the endometrium of the mother. Trophoblasts are cells that form the outer layer of the blastocyst and develop into a large portion of the placenta. They also are crucial for attaching an embryo to the uterine lining of a female. Due to their high importance, trophoblasts play a key role in interspecific pregnancy success. For example, the placental glycosylation pattern at the fetomaternal interface should optimally be similar to that of the host species.

Yet, for some species, such as a Bactrian camel embryo inside a dromedary, pregnancy can be carried to term with no other intervention than the embryo transfer. This is possible for gaur embryos inside cattle as well, but with severe intrauterine growth restriction, with uncertainty of how much is caused by the IVF procedure itself, and how much is caused by interspecies incompatibility.

The ability of one species to survive inside the uterus of another species is in many cases unidirectional; that is, pregnancy would not necessarily be successful in the inverse situation where a fetus of the other species would be transferred into the uterus of the first one. For example, horse embryos survive in the donkey uterus, but donkey embryos perish in the uterus of an untreated mare. Deer mouse embryos survive in the uterus of the white-footed mouse, but the reciprocal transfer fails.

== Techniques in interspecific pregnancy ==
=== Overcoming rejection ===
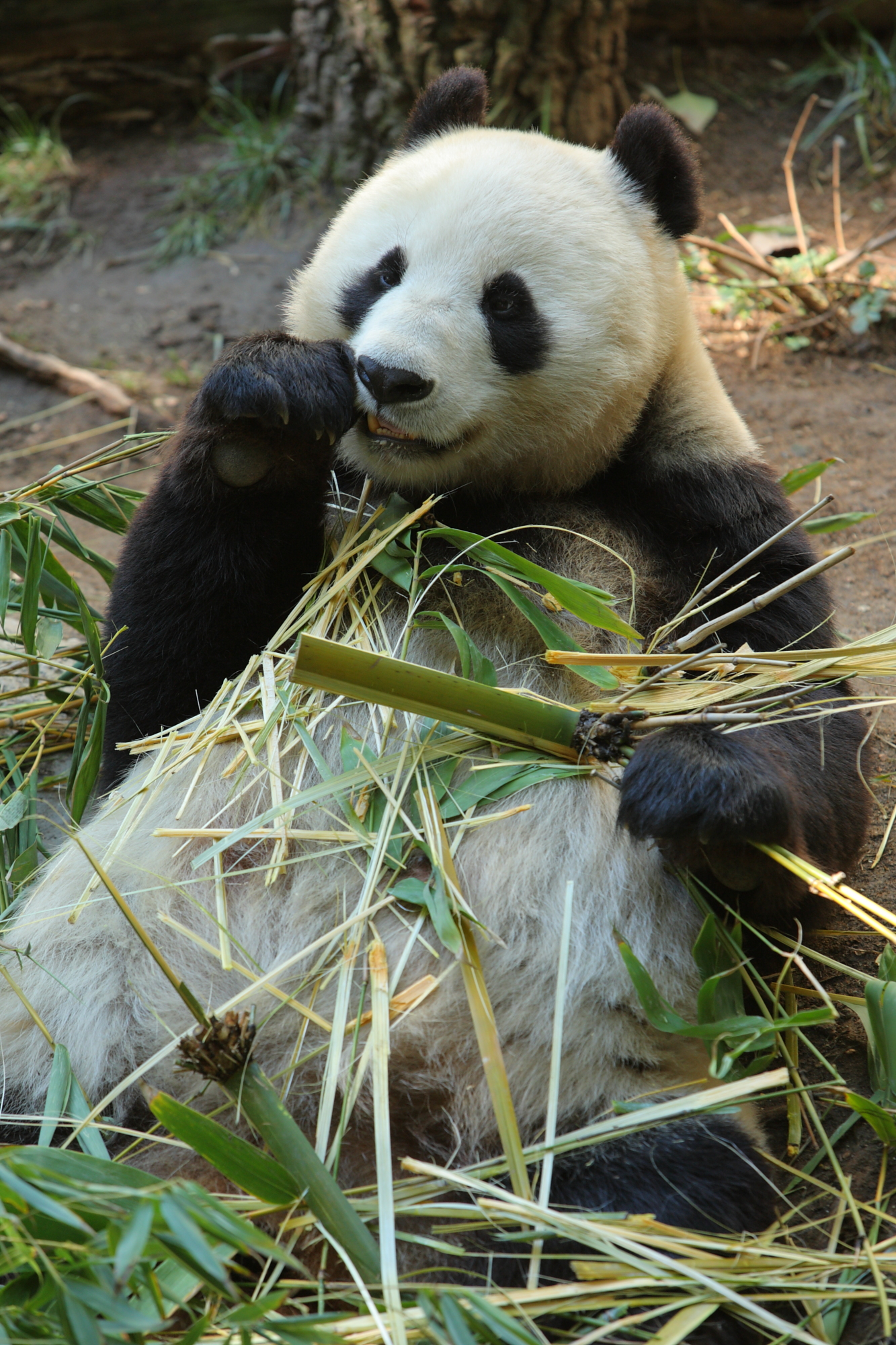
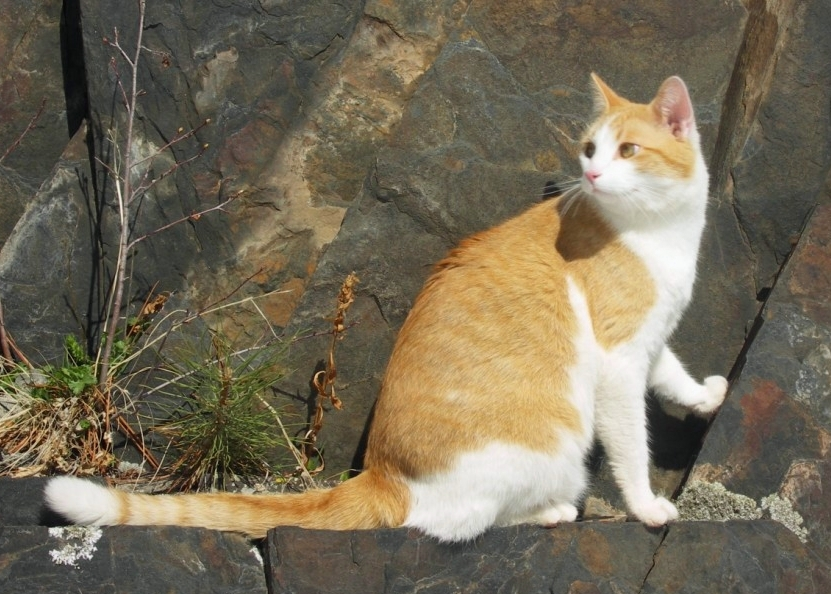
Fetuses of the giant panda (left) have been grown in the womb of a cat (right) by intercurrently inserting panda and cat embryos into the cat womb.

Methods to artificially stimulate gestational immune tolerance towards a xeno-fetus include intercurrently introducing a component of a normal allogeneic pregnancy. For example, embryos of the species Spanish ibex are aborted when inserted alone into the womb of a goat, but when introduced together with a goat embryo, they may develop to term. This technique has also been used to grow panda fetuses in a cat, but the cat mother died of pneumonia before she completed term. Also, murine embryos of Ryukyu mouse (Mus caroli) will survive to term inside the uterus of a house mouse (Mus musculus) only if enveloped in Mus musculus trophoblast cells. Goat fetuses have likewise been successfully grown in sheep wombs by enveloping the goat inner cell mass in sheep trophoblast. Such envelopment can be created by first isolating the inner cell mass of blastocysts of the species to be reproduced by immunosurgery, wherein the blastocyst is exposed to antibodies toward that species. Because only the outer layer, that is, the trophoblastic cells, are exposed to the antibodies, only these cells will be destroyed by subsequent exposure to complement. The remaining inner cell mass can be injected into a blastocele of the recipient species to acquire its trophoblastic cells. It has been theorized that the allogeneic component prevents the production of maternal lymphocytes and cytotoxic anti-fetal antibodies, but the mechanism remains uncertain.

A blastocyst, with the inner cell mass, which will become the fetus, colored green. The trophoblast layer, which can be replaced with that of another species, is colored purple.

On the other hand, immune suppression with ciclosporin has shown no effect for this purpose. Pre-transfer immunization with antigens from the species providing the embryo has promoted more rapid and uniform failure of the interspecies pregnancy in mice, but increased survival in horse-donkey experiments.

=== Embryo creation ===
Embryos may be created by in vitro fertilization (IVF) with gametes from a male and female of the species to be reproduced. They may also be created by somatic cell nuclear transfer (SCNT) into an egg cell of another species, creating a cloned embryo that transferred into the uterus of yet another species. This technique was used for the experiment of panda fetuses in a cat mentioned in techniques for overcoming rejection. In this experiment, nuclei from cells taken from abdominal muscles of giant pandas were transferred to egg cells of rabbits and, in turn, transferred into the uterus of cat together with cat embryos. Concomitant use of SCNT and interspecific pregnancy has also been speculated to potentially recreate the mammoth species, for example by taking genetic material from mammoth specimens preserved in permafrost and transferring it into egg cells and subsequently the uterus of an elephant.

== Ethics concerning interspecific pregnancy ==
Although there have been many examples of successful interspecific pregnancies, there are still many researchers who question if this is ethical. Experimenting on animals is already brings in questions about an animals welfare, adding pregnancy on top of that only complicates things further. For animal research to be considered as ethical, there cannot be any other options in terms of research (i.e. there is no easier form of research) and the data gathered will be so beneficial, the infringement of the animal’s wellbeing is worth it (a lesser of the two evils). Based on this framework, and the fact that this research has already taken place (as an ethics committee must agree the research reaches the criteria), this research is considered ethical.
