= Jan Deprest =

Belgian fetal surgeon and academic

Jan Deprest FRCOG
- Known for: Fetal surgery, fetoscopic endoluminal tracheal occlusion (FETO), the Eurofoetus consortium, the TOTAL trial
- Awards: Ian Donald Gold Medal (2018)
- Scientific career
- Fields: Obstetrics and gynaecology, fetal surgery
- Workplaces: KU Leuven; University Hospitals Leuven; University College London; UCLH

Jan A. Deprest is a Belgian obstetrician–gynaecologist and fetal surgeon. He is professor of obstetrics and gynaecology at the Katholieke Universiteit Leuven and at University College London, and a consultant at the University Hospitals Leuven and at University College London Hospitals. He is known for his work in minimally invasive fetal surgery, including the development of fetoscopic endoluminal tracheal occlusion (FETO) for congenital diaphragmatic hernia and his leadership of the international TOTAL trial.

== Career ==
Deprest is academic chair of the Department of Development and Regeneration at KU Leuven and director of the university's Interdepartmental Centre for Surgical Technologies; clinically he directs the fetal surgery programme in Leuven. He also works at University College London, where he is affiliated with the Institute for Women's Health, and as a consultant at University College London Hospitals. He trained in fetal medicine in Leuven, at St George's Hospital in London, in Leiden in the Netherlands, and in the programme at the Children's Hospital of Philadelphia.

He established and directed the Eurofoetus consortium, a European Commission–supported collaboration dedicated to developing instruments and techniques for minimally invasive fetal and placental surgery. He has published several hundred peer-reviewed papers and supervised more than thirty doctoral students, and is an editor of the journal Prenatal Diagnosis.

== Research and clinical contributions ==
=== Congenital diaphragmatic hernia ===
Deprest developed a percutaneous method for the fetoscopic placement of a balloon in the fetal trachea, known as fetoscopic endoluminal tracheal occlusion (FETO), intended to promote lung growth in fetuses with severe pulmonary hypoplasia due to congenital diaphragmatic hernia. He subsequently led the international, multicentre Tracheal Occlusion To Accelerate Lung Growth (TOTAL) trial, whose two randomised arms—for severe and for moderate left-sided congenital diaphragmatic hernia—were published in The New England Journal of Medicine in 2021.

=== Twin-to-twin transfusion syndrome ===
The Eurofoetus group he founded conducted trials that helped establish fetoscopic laser coagulation as a preferred treatment for severe twin-to-twin transfusion syndrome.

=== Spina bifida ===
In 2012, Deprest's team in Leuven began a programme of open fetal surgery to close spina bifida lesions before birth, and the programme was later extended to University College London Hospitals as a fetal surgery centre in the United Kingdom.

== Honours ==
Deprest received the Ian Donald Gold Medal of the International Society of Ultrasound in Obstetrics and Gynecology in 2018, and the J. Daels prize of the Royal Academy of Medicine of Belgium. He is a Fellow of the Royal College of Obstetricians and Gynaecologists (FRCOG).

== Selected publications ==
- Deprest J, Gratacos E, Nicolaides KH (2004). "Fetoscopic tracheal occlusion (FETO) for severe congenital diaphragmatic hernia: evolution of a technique and preliminary results". Ultrasound in Obstetrics & Gynecology. 24 (2): 121–126. doi:10.1002/uog.1711.
- Deprest JA, Nicolaides KH, Benachi A, et al. (2021). "Randomized Trial of Fetal Surgery for Severe Left Diaphragmatic Hernia". New England Journal of Medicine. 385 (2): 107–118. doi:10.1056/NEJMoa2027030. PMID 34106556.
- Deprest JA, Benachi A, Gratacos E, et al. (2021). "Randomized Trial of Fetal Surgery for Moderate Left Diaphragmatic Hernia". New England Journal of Medicine. 385 (2): 119–129. doi:10.1056/NEJMoa2026983. PMID 34106555.
