= Germinal matrix (brain) =

In anatomy, the germinal matrix is a highly cellular and highly vascularized region in the brain out from which cells migrate during brain development. The germinal matrix is the source of both neurons and glial cells and is most active between 8 and 28 weeks gestation. It is a fragile portion of the brain that may be damaged leading to a germinal matrix hemorrhage (grade 1 intraventricular hemorrhage).

== Anatomy ==
The germinal matrix is next to the lateral ventricles (the "inside" of the brain).

== Function ==
Neurons and glia migrate radially outward from the germinal matrix towards the cerebral cortex. For more information, see the associated articles on neuronal migration and corticogenesis.

== Clinical significance ==
In prenatology/neonatology, intraventricular hemorrhages occur starting in the germinal matrix due to the lack of structural integrity there. Intraventricular hemorrhages are a common and harmful issue in children born prematurely.

== See also ==
- Intraventricular hemorrhage
- Ganglionic eminence
