= Germinal matrix hemorrhage =

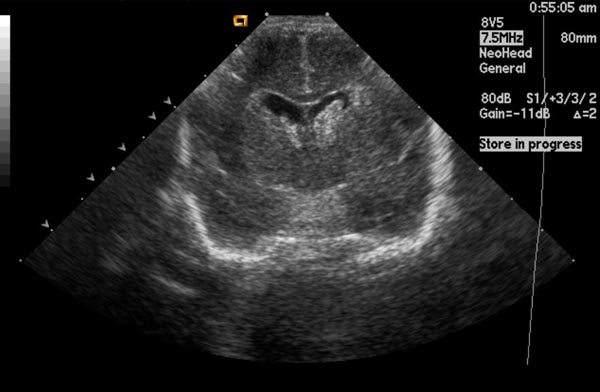
- Cranial ultrasound of germinal matrix hemorrhage
- Specialty: Neurology, neonatology
- Symptoms: Often asymptomatic
- Complications: Posthemorrhagic ventricular dilation, neurodevelopmental impairment, hearing impairment, visual impairment, cerebral palsy, epilepsy
- Usual onset: Infancy, within first few days after birth
- Risk factors: Preterm birth (before 32 weeks gestation), very low birth weight (<1500 grams)
- Diagnostic method: Cranial ultrasound, MRI

Germinal matrix hemorrhage (also known as germinal matrix-intraventricular hemorrhage, GM-IVH) is a type of intraventricular hemorrhage that commonly occurs in preterm and very low birth weight infants. Bleeding occurs in the subependymal germinal matrix with or without subsequent rupture into the lateral ventricle. Such intraventricular hemorrhage may occur due to perinatal asphyxia or other perinatal stressors in preterm neonates. GM-IVH is typically diagnosed via imaging and associated with long term complications including neurodevelopmental impairment, cerebral palsy, and epilepsy.

== Clinical features ==
Most neonates with GM-IVH are asymptomatic and diagnosed via imaging within the first two weeks of life. Infants may experience convulsions, a bulging fontanelle, recurrent apnea, respiratory distress, pallor, and temperature instability. Lab work may show a low hematocrit if the hemorrhage is large.

== Pathophysiology ==
The germinal matrix is the site of proliferating neuronal and glial precursors in the developing brain. As a transient, highly vascular region of the fetal brain, it exists from 15-32 weeks of gestation. It is located above the caudate nucleus, in the floor of the lateral ventricle, and at the caudothalamic groove. The germinal matrix consists of a rich network of fragile thin-walled blood vessels. Hence the microcirculation in this particular area is extremely sensitive to hypoxia and changes in perfusion pressure. The region is sensitive to hemodynamic instability because the vessels here have sparse coverage of pericytes and astrocytes compared to other regions of the brain, causing a lack of structural integrity. Border zones, junctions where two new vessel endpoints that arose from different origins meet, are particularly vulnerable.

GM-IVH frequently occurs in infants born before 32 weeks gestation and is typically seen in very low birth-weight (<1500g) premature infants because they lack adequate auto-regulation of cerebral blood flow. Consequently, increased arterial blood pressure in these blood vessels leads to rupture and hemorrhage into the germinal matrix.

== Screening and diagnosis ==
Screening is commonly performed with cranial ultrasound (CUS) due to the modality's high sensitivity and specificity, ease of use, and availability. However, screening guidelines and protocols vary. The American Academy of Pediatrics (AAP) recommends screening neonates born prior to 30 weeks of gestation as well as neonates born after 30 weeks of gestation with significant risk factors for brain injury. Risk factors include (but are not limited to) low APGAR scores, placental abruption and perinatal asphyxiation, and need for vigorous resuscitation on day 1 of life. Per AAP recommendations, initial CUS should occur within the first 7-10 days of life. Subsequent CUS should occur at 4-6 weeks of life and again at term corrected age or prior to hospital discharge. If abnormalities are detected at any point, serial CUS should be performed. Magnetic resonance imaging (MRI) may be used as well.

=== Grades ===
The Papile grading system is a CT-based classification system used to classify germinal matrix hemorrhage:

- grade I - hemorrhage is confined to the germinal matrix.
- grade II - intraventricular hemorrhage without ventricular dilatation
- grade III - intraventricular hemorrhage with ventricular dilatation
- grade IV - intraventricular rupture and hemorrhage into the surrounding white matter

In the grading system proposed by Papile, the grade 4 hemorrhages results from a subependymal bleeding into the adjacent brain parenchyma. Today, however, these bleedings are regarded as venous hemorrhagic infarctions. This is a result of veins compressed by the subependymal bleeding.

The Volpe grading system, another widely accepted classification system, classifies germinal matrix hemorrhage based on cranial ultrasound imaging.

- grade I: hemorrhage in the subependymal germinal matrix
- grade II: hemorrhage into the lateral ventricle without ventricular dilation, and/or hemorrhage occupying <50% of the ventricle
- grade III: ventricular dilation and/or hemorrhage occupying >50% of the ventricle
- grade IV: ventricular hemorrhage extending into the surrounding parenchyma

In general, grades I-II are considered mild GM-IVH while grades III-IV are considered severe GM-IVH.

== Prevention ==
Given that the primary risk factor for germinal matrix hemorrhage is prematurity of the neonate, the main prevention strategies are targeted at decreasing the incidence of preterm birth.

Antenatal corticosteroids have a role in reducing incidence of germinal matrix hemorrhage in premature infants. Corticosteroids suppress VEGF and promote TGF-beta, downregulating angiogenesis, improving pericyte coverage, and decreasing the likelihood of hemorrhage. Delayed umbilical cord clamping has also been associated with reduced incidence of lower grades of GMH. However, delayed clamping is only appropriate in vigorous infants not requiring neonatal resuscitation.

== Management ==
Treatment of GM-IVH is largely supportive and depends on the specific sequelae of the hemorrhage. It is important to maintain adequate blood pressure and provide respiratory support as needed to prevent further injury. The neonate may require intervention for hypotension, shock, anemia, and metabolic acidosis. EEG may be appropriate if seizure activity occurs. Stem cell-based therapies may help to treat germinal matrix hemorrhage, but there is currently no reliable evidence to support their use.

== Prognosis ==
The primary acute complication of GM-IVH is posthemorrhagic hydrocephalus (PHH), also known as posthemorrhagic ventricular dilation (PHVD). Of those born with GM-IVH, 9% develop PHH, and higher grades of GM-IVH are associated with higher risk of PHH. The risk of death during initial hospitalization is at least 20-33% of infants with GM-IVH, and the risk increases with higher grades of hemorrhage. Infants with PHH may require neurosurgical shunt placement.

Long term complications vary and depend on the infant's gestational age at birth, extent of hemorrhage, involvement of the brain parenchyma, and severity of GM-IVH. Mild GM-IVH has been associated with increased risk of neurodevelopmental impairment, motor and cognitive delays, and lower scores on indicies of mental and psychomotor development. Severe GM-IVH is associated with an increased risk of neurodevelopmental impairment compared to mild GM-IVH. Additional potential complications include cerebral palsy, cognitive delay, lower IQ, and epilepsy.

== Epidemiology ==
The incidence of GM-IVH in preterm infants is between 14.7%-44.7% worldwide, with most cases developing by day 7 of life. It is especially common in preterm neonates born before 32 weeks gestational age and infants with a birth weight below 1,500 g. The overall prevalence and severity of GM-IVH has remained stable since 2007. However, studies since then have shown that the onset of IVH has shifted to occur later, such as after 12 hours of life, while it was previously more common within the first 6 hours of life. This trend may be attributed to the increased use of antenatal glucocorticoids.

== See also ==
- Ganglionic eminence, a part of the germinal matrix
