= Intraventricular hemorrhage =

Bleeding into the brain's ventricular system

- Other names: intraventricular haemorrhage, intraventricular bleeding
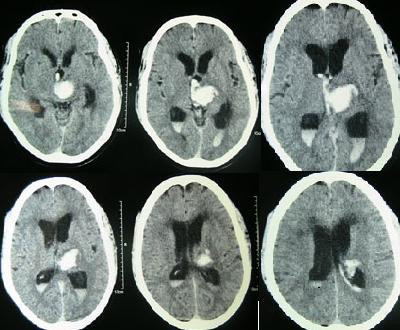
- CT scan showing spontaneous intracerebral hemorrhage with bleeding in the third and both lateral ventricles and hydrocephalus
- Specialty: Neurology

Intraventricular hemorrhage (IVH), also known as intraventricular bleeding, is a bleeding into the brain's ventricular system, where the cerebrospinal fluid is produced and circulates through towards the subarachnoid space. It can result from physical trauma or from hemorrhagic stroke.

30% of intraventricular hemorrhage (IVH) are primary, confined to the ventricular system and typically caused by intraventricular trauma, aneurysm, vascular malformations, or tumors, particularly of the choroid plexus. However 70% of IVH are secondary in nature, resulting from an expansion of an existing intraparenchymal or subarachnoid hemorrhage. Intraventricular hemorrhage has been found to occur in 35% of moderate to severe traumatic brain injuries. Thus the hemorrhage usually does not occur without extensive associated damage, and so the outcome is rarely good.

== Symptoms ==
=== Adults ===
Symptoms of IVH are similar to other intracerebral hemorrhages and include sudden onset of headache, nausea and vomiting, together with an alteration of the mental state and/or level of consciousness. Focal neurological signs that affect specific regions of the body are either minimal or absent, but focal and/or generalized seizures may occur. Xanthochromia, yellow-tinged cerebral spinal fluid, is a common finding, however other medical conditions can also be associated with xanthochromia.

=== Infants ===
Some infants are asymptomatic and others may present with hard to detect abnormalities of consciousness, muscle tone, breathing, movements of their eyes, and body movements.

== Causes ==
=== Adults ===
Causes of IVH in adults include physical trauma or from hemorrhagic stroke.

=== Infants ===
Infants that are preterm and very low birth weight are also at high risk. IVH in the preterm brain usually arises from the germinal matrix whereas IVH in the term infants originates from the choroid plexus. However, it is particularly common in premature infants or those of very low birth weight. The cause of IVH in premature infants, unlike that in older infants, children or adults, is rarely due to trauma. Instead it is thought to result from changes in perfusion of the delicate cellular structures that are present in the growing brain, augmented by the immaturity of the cerebral circulatory system, which is especially vulnerable to hypoxic ischemic encephalopathy. The lack of blood flow results in cell death and subsequent breakdown of the blood vessel walls, leading to bleeding. While this bleeding can result in further injury, it is itself a marker for injury that has already occurred. Most intraventricular hemorrhages occur in the first 72 hours after birth. The risk is increased with use of extracorporeal membrane oxygenation in preterm infants. Congenital cytomegalovirus infection can be an important cause.

== Etiology ==
The most common cause for periventricular-intraventricular hemorrhage (PIVH) in newborn infants is the fragility and unique morphology of blood vessels in the germinal matrix, as well as an immature cerebral autoregulation mechanism. This mechanism normally allows the brain to maintain stable blood flow despite blood pressure fluctuations, so underdevelopment in this area markedly increases the risk of bleeding. In addition, blood vessels in the neonatal germinal matrix have a higher density, surface area, and rounder shape. These differences further contribute to IVH risk. Some external risk factors of neonatal IVH include transport following outside delivery, mechanical ventilation, and frequent intubation.

== Diagnosis ==
Diagnosis can be confirmed by the presence of blood inside the ventricles on CT.

=== Infants ===
In term and preterm infants with IVH, the amount of bleeding varies. IVH is often described in four grades:

- Grade I - bleeding occurs just in the germinal matrix
- Grade II - bleeding also occurs inside the ventricles, but they are not enlarged
- Grade III - ventricles are enlarged by the accumulated blood
- Grade IV - bleeding extends into the brain tissue around the ventricles

Grades I and II are most common, and often there are no further complications. Grades III and IV are the most serious and may result in long-term brain injury to the infant. After a grade III or IV IVH, blood clots may form which can block the flow of cerebrospinal fluid, leading to increased fluid in the brain (hydrocephalus).

== Prevention ==
In the prenatal period, a single course of corticosteroids given from gestational ages of 24 weeks 0 days to 33 weeks 6 days has been shown in several studies to reduce the risk of intraventricular hemorrhage in the neonatal period. Head positioning in very preterm infants has been suggested as an approach to prevent germinal matrix haemorrhage; however, further research is required to determine the effectiveness at reducing mortality and the most appropriate positioning technique. Approaches include bed tilting, supine mid-line head positioning, supine head rotation 90 degrees, prone mid-line head positioning, head tiling.

== Treatment ==
Treatment focuses on monitoring and should be accomplished with inpatient floor service for individuals responsive to commands or neurological ICU observation for those with impaired levels of consciousness. Extra attention should be placed on intracranial pressure (ICP) monitoring via an intraventricular catheter and medications to maintain ICP, blood pressure, and coagulation. In more severe cases an external ventricular drain may be required to maintain ICP and evacuate the hemorrhage, and in extreme cases an open craniotomy may be required. In cases of unilateral IVH with small intraparenchymal hemorrhage the combined method of stereotaxy and open craniotomy has produced promising results.

=== Infants ===
There have been various therapies employed into preventing the high rates of morbidity and mortality, including diuretic therapy, repeated lumbar puncture, streptokinase therapy and a combination novel intervention called DRIFT (drainage, irrigation and fibrinolytic therapy). More research is required, in the form of high quality randomized controlled trials, to determine the safety, dosing, and effectiveness of prophylactic heparin and antithrombin treatment for preterm neonates.

== Prognosis ==
In infants, germinal matrix haemorrhage is associated with cerebral palsy, problems with cognition, and hydrocephalus. With improved technological advances in science and medicine, survival for preterm infants with this type of neurological disorder has improved and less preterm infants with germinal matrix haemorrhage have severe cerebral palsy. An estimated 15% of preterm infants who survive develop cerebral palsy and 27% of the infants who survive experience moderate to severe neurosensory deficits by the time they reach 18–24 months old.

Prognosis is very poor when IVH results from intracerebral hemorrhage related to high blood pressure and is even worse when hydrocephalus follows. It can result in dangerous increases in ICP and can cause potentially fatal brain herniation. Even independently, IVH can cause morbidity and mortality. First, intraventricular blood can lead to a clot in the CSF conduits blocking its flow and leading to obstructive hydrocephalus which may quickly result in increased intracranial pressure and death. Second, the breakdown products from the blood clot may generate an inflammatory response that damages the arachnoid granulations, inhibiting the regular reabsorption of CSF and resulting in permanent communicating hydrocephalus.

=== Associated conditions ===
Brain contusions and subarachnoid hemorrhages are commonly associated with IVH. The bleeding can involve the anterior communicating artery or the posterior communicating artery.

In both adults and infants, IVH can cause dangerous increases in ICP, damage to the brain tissue, and hydrocephalus.

== Epidemiology ==
IVH has been reported to occur in approximately 25% of infants who are born with a very low birth weight. In preterm infants, intraventricular haemorrhage and germinal matrix haemorrhage are the most widely reported neurological disorders. Approximately 12,000 infants each year are diagnosed with germinal matrix haemorrhage or intraventricular haemorrhage in the United States.

== Research ==
In 2002, a Dutch retrospective study analysed cases where neonatologists had intervened and drained CSF by lumbar or ventricular punctures if ventricular width (as shown on ultrasound) exceeded the 97th centile as opposed to the 97th centile plus 4 mm. Professors Whitelaw's original Cochrane review published in 2001 as well as evidence from previous randomised control trials indicated that interventions should be based on clinical signs and symptoms of ventricular dilatation. An international trial has instead looked an early (97th centile) versus late (97th centile plus 4 mm) for intervening and draining CSF.

DRIFT has been tested in an international randomised clinical trial; although it did not significantly lower the need for shunt surgery, severe cognitive disability at two years Bayley (MDI <55) was significantly reduced. Repeated lumbar punctures are used widely to reduce the effects in increased intracranial pressure and an alternative to ventriculoperitoneal (VP) shunt surgery that cannot be performed in case of intraventricular haemorrhage. The relative risk of repeated lumbar puncture is close to 1.0, therefore it is not statistically therapeutic when compared to conservative management and does raise the risk of subsequent CSF infection.
