= UZ Leuven =

Universitaire ziekenhuizen Leuven
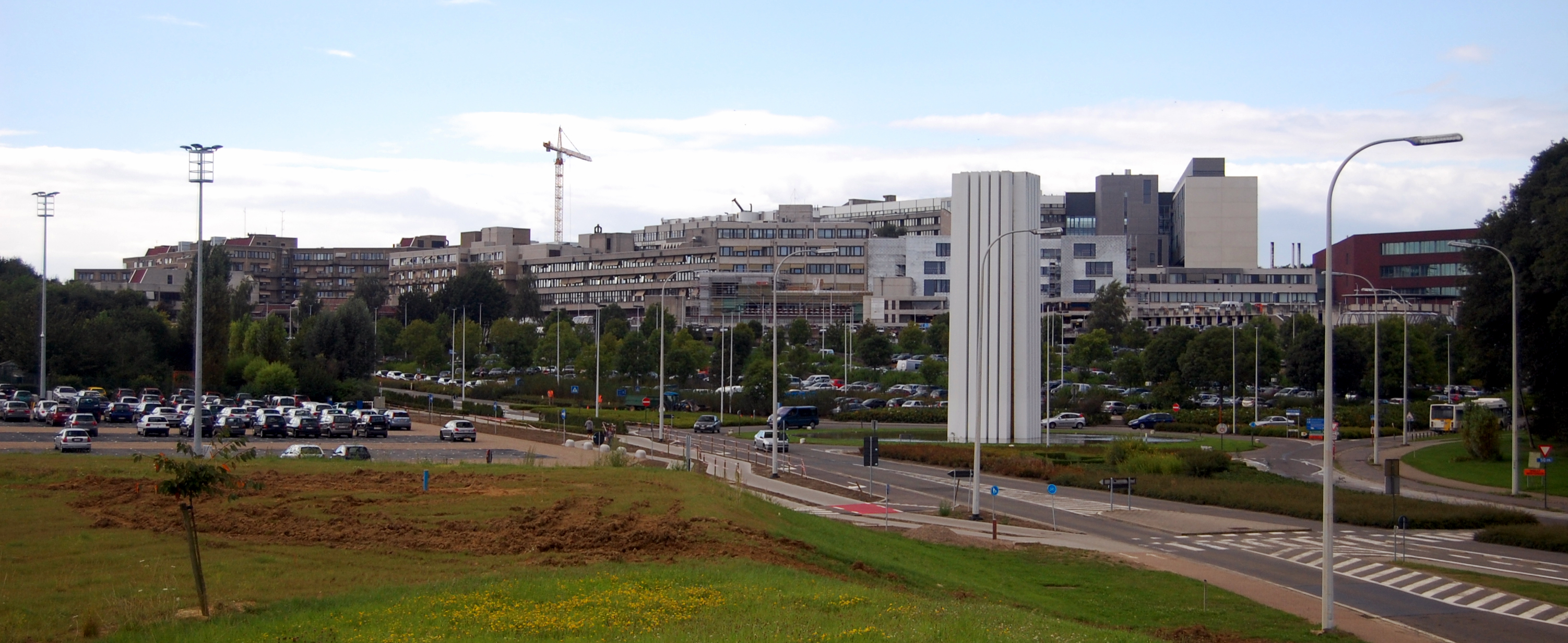
- A view of Campus Gasthuisberg

Geography
- Location: Leuven, Flemish Region, Belgium
- Coordinates: 50°52′49″N 4°41′44″E

Organisation
- Type: Teaching hospital
- Religious affiliation: Roman Catholicism
- Affiliated university: KU Leuven

Services
- Beds: 1,995

History
- Constructed: ~1080 (Sint-Pietersziekenhuis); 1971 (Gasthuisberg)
- Founded: 1080 (as Sint-Pietersziekenhuis); 1426 (academic hospital); 1970 (current structure)
- Demolished: 2020 (Sint-Pietersziekenhuis)

Links
- Website: uzleuven.be
- Lists: Hospitals in Belgium

Universitair Ziekenhuis Leuven or University Hospitals Leuven, often shortened to UZ Leuven, is an academic hospital in Leuven, Belgium, associated with the university KU Leuven. It consists of three campuses as of 2022; Gasthuisberg, Pellenberg and Sint-Rafaël.

The hospital has 1,995 beds and over 9,000 employees.

== Campuses ==
=== Campus Gasthuisberg ===
Literally translated 'guest house hill' (gasthuis is an obsolete Dutch word for hospital), its name has become synonymous with UZ Leuven. It is the biggest and most well known of all the campuses. It houses many facilities of the university among which research laboratories, auditoria of the faculty of medicine and faculty of pharmaceutical sciences, a manual procedures training center, a library and a student restaurant. Aside from the KU Leuven, the UCLL (University Colleges Leuven Limburg), part of KU Leuven Association, also has teaching facilities on the Gasthuisberg campus where bachelor’s degree programs such as nursing, dental hygiene, midwifery, medical imagery and other fields are taught.

The campus also includes St. Francis, affiliated with UCLL, which offers associate degrees in nursing. Lastly, there is the Leuven Perfusion School, affiliated with KU Leuven, which trains nurses and medical doctors in order to become certified clinical perfusionists.

Still expanding, this campus is known for being almost permanently under construction since the start of its construction in the early 1970s.

=== Campus Pellenberg ===
Campus Pellenberg is located in the district of Pellenberg, about 8 km from the city center of Leuven. It is located in a more rural area and is most known for being a recovery clinic.

As of 2017, UZ Leuven is relocating several services from the Pellenberg campus to the main campus, Gasthuisberg.

=== Campus Sint-Pieter ===
Sint-Pieter (Saint-Peter) was the oldest campus dating back to the year 1080. It used to be located in the city center.

By 2019, all operations in this campus were halted as the move to the Gasthuisberg campus was completed. Demolition of the buildings has been completed since 2021.

=== Campus Sint-Rafaël ===
Sint-Rafaël (Saint-Raphael) is located next to campus Sint-Pieter within the inner city of Leuven. There are some older auditoria and laboratories which are still in use. The human dissections of the faculty of medicine used to take place here. In 2020, a new human dissection teaching center opened at Campus Gasthuisberg. Since most clinical and educational operations now moved to campus Gasthuisberg, the Sint Rafael campus is partly deconstructed.

== History ==
- 1080: Sint-Pietersziekenhuis (Saint-Peter's Hospital) is built.
- 1426: Medical courses for the Old University of Leuven are taught at the Saint-Peter's Hospital.
- 1836: The city of Leuven and the newly established Catholic University of Louvain decide to build a new Saint-Peter's Hospital.
- 1928: The Catholic University of Louvain builds the Saint-Rafael campus. This is the official start of the university's own academic hospital.
- 1945: Partially destroyed after the Second World War, a new hospital is built.
- 1958: Sanatorium Saint Barbara in Pellenberg, for the treatment of tuberculosis, is attached to the Catholic University's academic hospital.
- 1970: After the split of the university into a French- and a Dutch-speaking part, UZ Leuven in its current structure is founded, accommodating the new, autonomous Dutch-speaking faculty of medicine. Construction of a new campus and academic hospital in Brussels for the French-speaking staff and faculty of the Université catholique de Louvain begins.
- 1971: A site just outside the city, known as Gasthuisberg, is found to be the ideal location for a new campus for the university hospital.
- 1975: Phase I of the new project, a pediatrics department, is now in use.
- 1971: The Katholieke Universiteit te Leuven takes over all the infrastructures in Leuven, and French-speaking staff and faculty leave the city and move to the newly built UCLouvain Brussels Woluwe campus in Brussels, where the Cliniques universitaires Saint-Luc are inaugurated.
- 1980: Phase II adds capacity and an emergency room, gynecology, maternity, internal medicine and surgery department.
- 1989: the start of phase III. Some departments from Pellenberg and Sint-Rafaël are moved to Gasthuisberg. The Centrum voor Menselijke Erfelijkheid (CME, center for human genetics) is now housed in Gasthuisberg together with other laboratories.
- 2001: A phase IV project should move remaining departments from Sint-Pieter to Gasthuisberg.
- 2010: The European Investment Bank grants EUR 325 million for the development of the Health Sciences Campus Gasthuisberg - Healthcare, Innovation and Education are not only physically combined but also intertwined at campus level.

== See also ==
- List of hospitals in Belgium
- Healthcare in Belgium
