= Hospital Sant Joan de Déu Barcelona =

Coordinates: 41°23′3″N 2°6′7″E

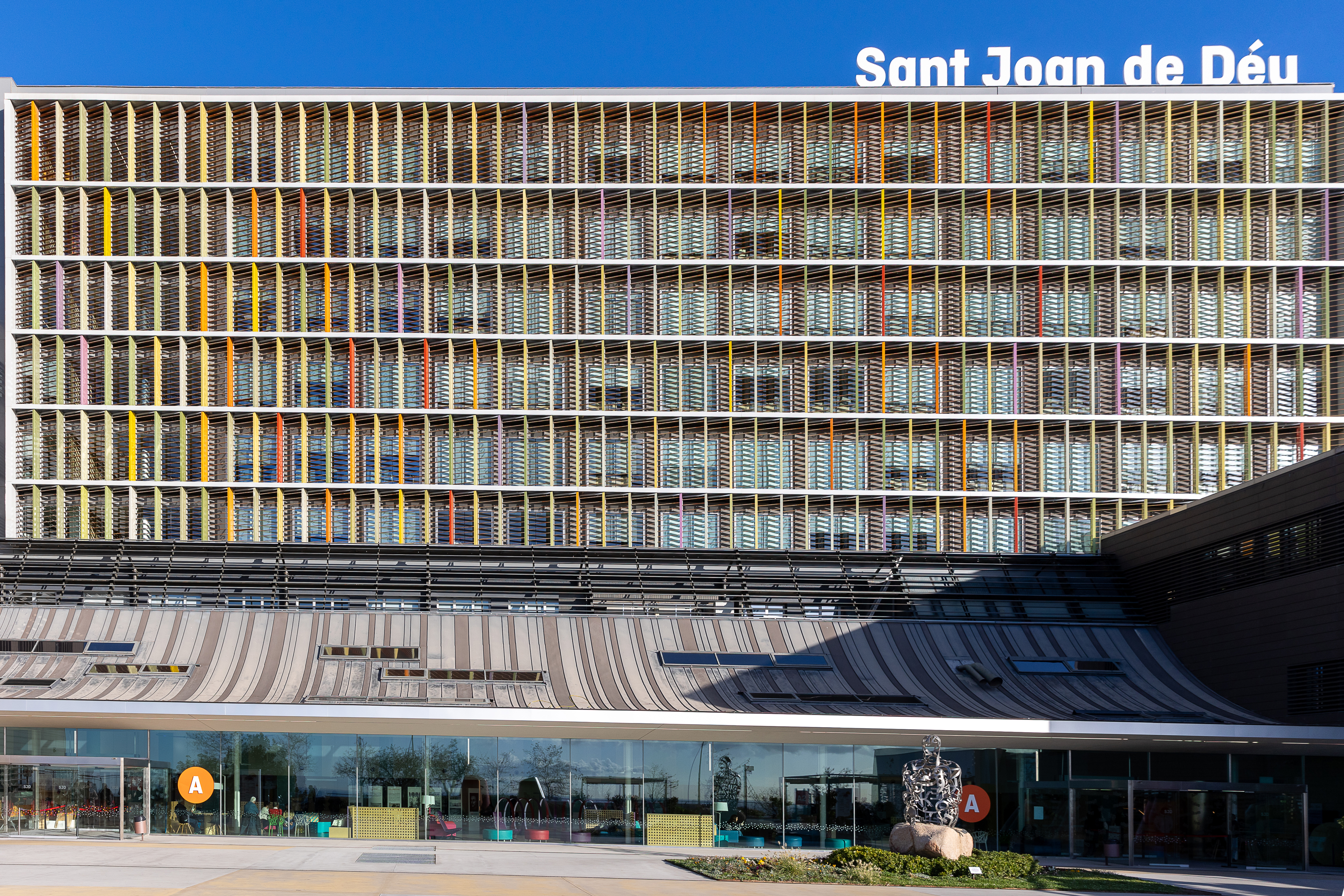
- Main entrance

Geography
- Location: 2 Passeig Sant Joan de Déu, Esplugues de Llobregat, Barcelona, Spain

Organisation
- Care system: Concerted public & Private & Charity
- Type: Specialist

Services
- Emergency department: Yes
- Beds: 362
- Speciality: Pediatric Obstetrics Gynecology

History
- Founded: 1867

Links
- Website: https://www.sjdhospitalbarcelona.org
- Lists: Hospitals in Spain
- Other links: List of hospitals in Spain

Hospital Sant Joan de Déu Barcelona is a teaching hospital specializing in the fields of pediatrics, gynecology and obstetrics. It is located on Passeig Sant Joan de Déu in Esplugues de Llobregat, a municipality bordering Barcelona, Catalonia (Spain). It is a privately owned center concerted by the Catalan Health Service which belongs to the Hospitaller Order of St. John of God, religious organization that manages nearly 300 health centers over the world, one of which is St John of God Hospital Sierra Leone.

The center has 362 beds and 12 operating rooms. It employs more than 1,200 professionals and attends more than 4,000 births and 130,000 emergencies annually, in addition to recording 26,000 admissions and performing 13,000 surgeries.

== History ==
Hospital Sant Joan de Déu was founded in 1867. In 1973 it was a concerted by the public health service and in 1983 became part of the Public Hospital Network. Since 2009, the hospital is associated with the National Association of Children's Hospitals and Related Institutions (NACHRI), a prestigious organization of children's hospitals working to promote health and access to healthcare for children, and has over 200 members at the U.S., Australia, Canada, Italy, Mexico and Puerto Rico.

== Teaching ==
Hospital Sant Joan de Déu has had an agreement since 1994 with the University of Barcelona to promote undergraduate and postgraduate teaching. Within it is also taught continuing education for professionals, from the center and external, and training internships for professionals in various aspects of pediatric specialties and perinatology.

== Research ==
The center promotes, in collaboration with the Foundation Sant Joan de Déu, several lines of research and has a building for research.

The main research teams focus their studies in:

- Neurological diseases, diseases, especially in neurometabolic processes.
- Diagnosis and new treatments for tumors of growth.
- Infectious diseases, especially in the field of HIV infection.
- Pathology associated with pneumococcal infection.
- Prevention and knowledge of adult diseases of fetal origin or in the early years of life.

== Innovation ==
Sant Joan de Déu Barcelona is the first Spanish center with a specific department dedicated to promoting innovation among its professionals and supports them so they can go through with their ideas, patent them and build the prototype.

Since 2013, they have been one of the first hospitals to experiment with 3D printing of organs.

== Solidarity schemes ==
Hospital Sant Joan de Déu is twinned with the Hospital of Lunsar in Sierra Leone. Nursing and pediatric professionals from the maternal-child center do health care stays in the African hospital to support local health professionals.

This partnership is complemented by the program Apadrina, which aims to finance the treatment of underprivileged children who are treated at the Hospital of Lunsar.

In 2004 the hospital launched, in collaboration with DKV Seguros and Foundation Somni dels Nens, the solidarity scheme Cuidam that treats children from third world who require highly complex treatments not available in their country.
