= Hospital Clínic de Barcelona =

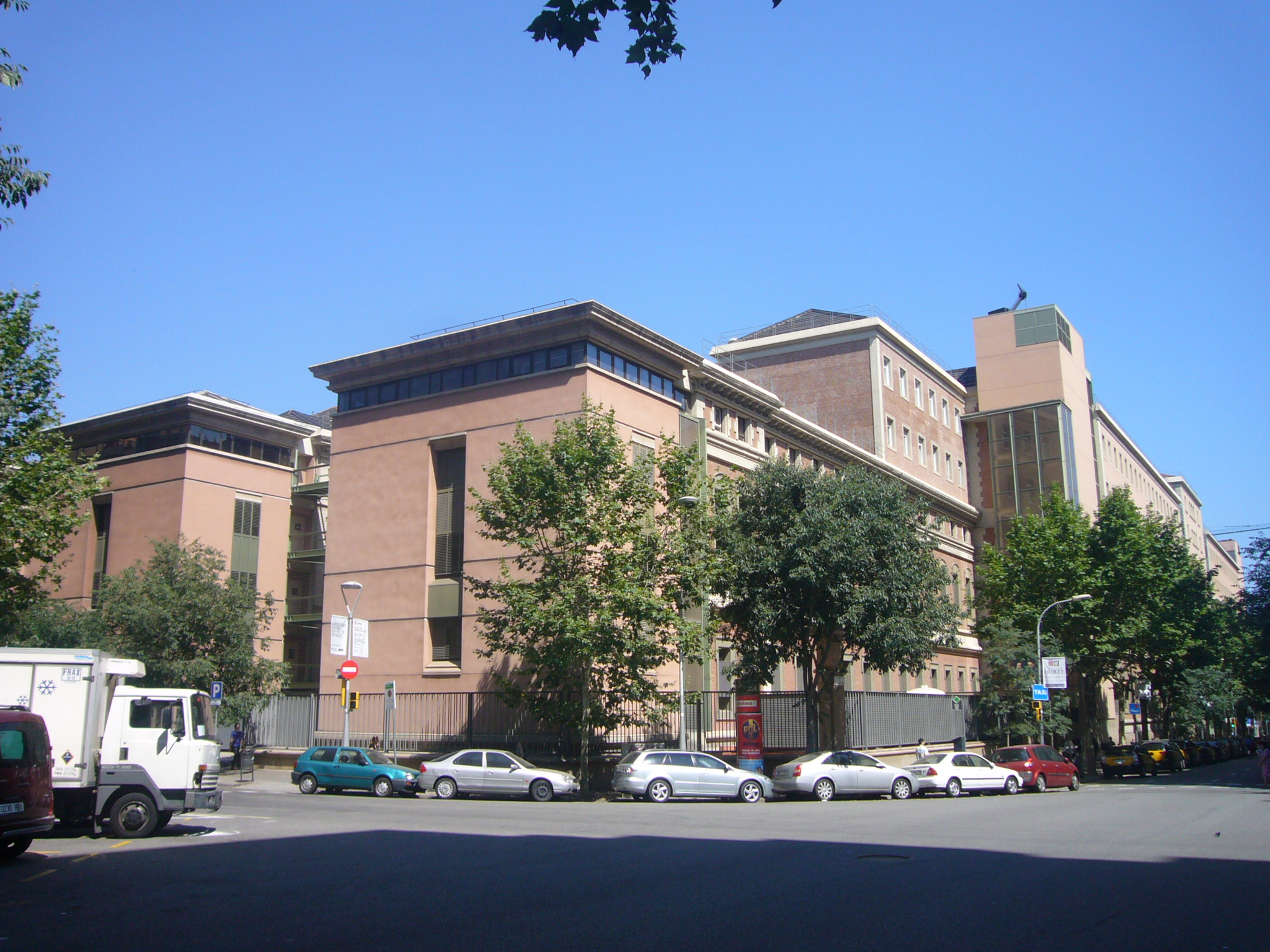
- Hospital Clínic

Geography
- Location: Barcelona, Catalonia, Spain
- Coordinates: 41.38926°N 2.15191°E

Organisation
- Care system: Public
- Type: Teaching
- Affiliated university: University of Barcelona
- Network: Catalan Public Health Network

Services
- Beds: 819

History
- Opened: 1906

Links
- Website: www.clinicbarcelona.org
- Lists: Hospitals in Spain

Hospital Clínic de Barcelona, officially Hospital Clínic i Provincial de Barcelona (Catalan pronunciation: [uspiˈtal ˈklinik i pɾuβinsiˈal də βərsəˈlonə]), is a university hospital founded in 1906 and based in Barcelona. It opened its doors on December 22 1906, with a capacity of 400 patients, some of which were moved from Hospital de la Santa Creu. It is currently part of the Catalan Health Service.

It has been awarded by IASIST for 10 consecutive years as a top 20 hospital in Spain. A private study conducted in 2009 ranked it as one of the top four national and regional hospitals in Spain, including all public and private facilities. In 2020 it was ranked by Newsweek as the best hospital in Spain and one of the 25 best in the world.

It is located on the left side of the Eixample and serves as a university hospital for the University of Barcelona Faculty of Medicine, with which it forms a functional unit. Due to its university character, its healthcare activity is complemented by teaching and medical research.

The population assigned as a community hospital, together with Hospital Plató and the Clínica Sagrat Cor, is 540,000. It also works as a complex tertiary hospital, developing lines of activity for patients in Spain and internationally.

== Healthcare ==
It is considered the main public healthcare provider in its catchment area in the city of Barcelona. It functions as a community hospital and also operates as a tertiary care facility for highly complex cases. It manages several centers, including a separate maternity hospital and some primary care centres. It also has a private subsidiary, Barnaclínic, a healthcare centre serving private patients. Hospital Clinic created the Transplant Services Foundation (TSF), specialised in the extraction and distribution of organs and tissues. The hospital also operates a hospital-at-home program, which provides hospital care to certain patients in their homes.

== Research ==
The hospital has historically been related to research. In 2020, Clínics' research is centralised through the August Pi i Sunyer Biomedical Research Institute (IDIBAPS). It also manages a Foundation for Biomedical Research (FCRB).

== Teaching ==
Hospital Clínic manages teaching activities for both undergraduate and post-graduate levels, including formal training for medical residents and existing staff. It is closely linked to the Faculty of Medicine of the University of Barcelona. It also offers external training, organized under the brand Aula Clínic.
