= Pulmonary agenesis =

- Specialty: Pulmonology

Pulmonary agenesis is an inborn lung underdevelopment that is rare and potentially lethal. The disorder is caused by a complete developmental arrest of the primitive lung during embryonic life, and it is often associated with other developmental defects. Bilateral and unilateral pulmonary agenesis are classified, depending on whether one side of the lung or both sides are affected. Bilateral pulmonary agenesis is lethal, while the mortality rate of unilateral pulmonary agenesis is higher than 50%. Depending on the severity, the symptom ranges from none to various respiratory complaints. It is detectable prenatally, however, its nonspecific clinical features act as the obstacle for diagnosing. The exact cause of pulmonary agenesis is still obscure. However, theories have been raised regarding the vascular, iatrogenic, viral and genetic causes of pulmonary agenesis in an attempt to explain the pathogenesis of the disorder. In most cases of pulmonary agenesis, surgical resection is performed to remove the malformed lobe or the entire defected lung of the patient depending on the severity of the respiratory impairment.

== Signs and symptoms ==
Pulmonary agenesis is the complete absence of lung tissue, including bronchial tree, lung parenchyma, and supporting vasculatures. The only remaining part is rudimentary bronchus. Hence, the affected areas lose their function of gas exchange. This malformation is thought to involve the proliferation arrest of lung buds during embryo development, while the causes are still debatable. In many cases, it is associated with the occurrence of other inborn malformations. The estimated prevalence of pulmonary agenesis is 34/1,000,000 live births, with a slightly higher possibility in the female population.

Two types of pulmonary agenesis are classified based on the severity of underdevelopment: bilateral and unilateral pulmonary agenesis.

=== Bilateral pulmonary agenesis ===
Bilateral pulmonary agenesis means that both sides of the lung are absent, its occurrence is rare compared to unilateral pulmonary agenesis. The fetus loses the ability to do gas exchange post-delivery, and is hence incompatible with life after birth.

=== Unilateral pulmonary agenesis ===
The severity of unilateral pulmonary agenesis varies depending on the area of tissue affected, being either a single lobe or a whole lung.

The clinical features varies in individuals from asymptomatic to various respiratory complaints. The occurrences of symptoms also vary from infant stage to childhood, teenager, and adult life. Frequently seen clinical features includes dyspnea, respiratory distress, recurrent pulmonary infections, and limited exercise tolerance. Rapid heartbeat, cyanosis, chest asymmetry, dullness may also be present.

Lung function is significantly affected in cases of pulmonary agenesis, demonstrated by reduction in forced expiratory volume and forced vital capacity. This reduction in total lung volume sets limits on patients’ exercise tolerance, and contribute to shortness of breath after exercises. The retention of bronchial secretions often leads to recurrent pulmonary infections, adding to damage in lung function, hence causing respiratory stress.

=== Associated anomalies ===
Considering the fact that a large proportion of mortality cases of pulmonary agenesis are partly due to the presence of associated malformations, it is common to find other congenital anomalies associated with this type of disorder. Although some cases of bilateral pulmonary agenesis were reported as an isolated finding, most cases of pulmonary agenesis are associated with other anomalies, especially in the gastrointestinal, genitourinary and ocular systems. Frequently associated congenital anomalies include tracheal stenosis, esophageal atresia, tracheoesophageal fistula, bronchogenic cysts, patent ductus arteriosus, tetralogy of Fallot and anomalies of the great vessels.

== Causes ==
Although pulmonary agenesis, aplasia and hypoplasia are lethal congenital disorders all resulting from underdevelopment of lungs, pulmonary agenesis and aplasia differ from pulmonary hypoplasia in their underlying cause. Unlike pulmonary hypoplasia which in most cases result from the incomplete development of lung during prenatal development, pulmonary agenesis and aplasia result from a complete developmental arrest of the primitive lung during embryonic life. The difference between pulmonary agenesis and aplasia is that pulmonary agenesis has complete absence of lung tissue, airways, and lung vessels while pulmonary aplasia has complete absence of lung tissue and lung vessels, but have some incompletely developed short airways.

Whether the disorder is bilateral or unilateral depends on the stage in which the arrest occurs during the embryonic stage of lung development. The earlier the occurrence of developmental arrest, the more severe the defect and the more likely that the agenesis will be bilateral. Bilateral pulmonary agenesis is highly rare and it is caused by the complete failure in the development of respiratory primordium, the primary structure developed in the earliest stage of embryonic development that gives rise to the entire respiratory tract. In this case, the absence of lung buds or pleural cavities is observed, thus making the case of bilateral pulmonary agenesis highly lethal.

On the other hand, unilateral pulmonary agenesis is caused by the imbalance in the development of lung buds. Either one side of the lung fails completely, leading to pulmonary aplasia, or one side of the lung is underdeveloped, leading to dysplasia or hypoplasia. These defects occur during the early stage of lung development, although not as early as bilateral pulmonary agenesis, when respiratory primordium bifurcates into right and left primitive lung buds at the end of the fourth week of gestation.

Although the exact cause of the disorder remains obscure, theories have been advanced throughout history to explain the pathogenesis of lung agenesis. Based on an in vitro experiment done in rats, researchers observed lung aplasia in animals that were fed with a diet deficient in vitamin A. From the result of this experiment, a theory was raised that vitamin A deficiency during pregnancy may cause pulmonary agenesis. Some authors have suggested vascular cause of pulmonary agenesis similar to the causes for intestinal atresia and others suggested Iatrogenic and viral factors as potential causes of pulmonary agenesis. Genetic cause for pulmonary agenesis has also been raised. It has been said that the gene responsible for the cause of pulmonary agenesis may have variable expressivity and penetrance.

== Diagnosis ==
The symptoms of pulmonary agenesis are unspecific, and their occurrence varies between individuals. These factors increased the difficulty for physicians to diagnose. So, there is a considerable time delay for the disease to be diagnosed, though it's capable of detection since birth or even prenatally.

=== Prenatal ===
Prenatal diagnosis of pulmonary agenesis is yet to be reached satisfaction, due to the technical difficulties in differentiating this disorder with other malformation. Only a few cases of reported cases are diagnosed before birth. Prenatal sonographic evaluation, also known as Biophysical profile, is frequently used for prenatal testing. High frequency of associated abnormalities (see the section - "Associated Abnormalities" for details) may also lead to suspicion of pulmonary agenesis.

2‐dimensional color Doppler imaging could visually capture the blood flow, hence determine the existence of pulmonary vasculature. It is also a frequently used technique for pulmonary agenesis diagnosis.

Congenital diaphragmatic hernia (CDH), in this case, the upward displacement of the diaphragm and abdominal organs, is a possible clinical outcome detectable before birth. The displacement is caused by organ herniation occupying the empty space in the chest wall, while this space is created by the absence of lung tissue. However, it's important to note that a list of other disorders could also be the cause of CDH.

=== After birth ===
Several techniques are frequently involved in the diagnosis of pulmonary agenesis after birth:

- Chest X-ray is effective in detecting the traits of lung herniation. The unaffected side of lung tends to undergo hypertrophy, and move towards the empty space in the chest wall on the opposite side. This herniation could be indicated by fluoroscopy. With age increasing, the herniation progresses and ease its detection.
- Pulmonary angiography assists in detecting the presence of pulmonary artery branches, differentiating pulmonary agenesis to hypoplasia and aplasia.
- Electrocardiogram is useful in detecting dextrocardia, a possible outcome when agenesis is present on the right lung. With empty space in the chest wall, the heart rotates in clockwise direction, shifting the location for apex beat occurrence. Hence cardiac physical examination also helps as heart sounds is heard best at right chest with dextrocardia. In the condition of left side agenesis, heart sounds will appear to be louder than normal.
- Chest asymmetry, as a possible trait for pulmonary agenesis, is found to be more obvious in adult patients, especially in males. Breast development in females tends to make it less obvious for the observance of asymmetry, though it could still be indicated by a more conical shape and slightly higher location of the breast on the affected side.
- CT scan, bronchoscopy, bronchography and Magnetic resonance imaging also contributes to the observation of patients’ lung anatomy.

== Treatment ==
The treatment is dependent on the severity of respiratory impairment and the underlying etiology of the disorder. In most cases, surgical resection is performed to remove the nonfunctioning lobe or the entire defected lung. Removing the malformed part of the lung helps reduce symptoms and chances of lung infection.

In the past, patients underwent pulmonary plombage to render the empty hemithorax. Plombage, also known as extraperiosteal or extrapleural pneumonolysis, is a historical treatment procedure for cavity tuberculosis of upper lobes of lungs used between the 1930s and 1950s. During the operation, a cavity is created by the intrathoracic placement of inert materials, commonly Lucite (acrylic) balls, ping pong balls, oils, rubber sheets, paraffin wax, and gauze. As a result, the mediastinal and skeletal shift toward the volume loss side.

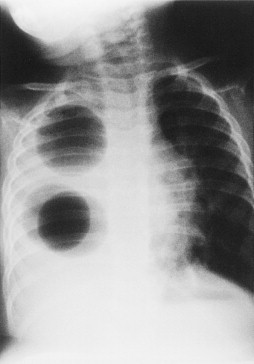
Chest radiograph of a 3-year-old who underwent right pulmonary plombage with insertion of three Ping-Pong balls 1 year earlier.

Recent approach involves the implantation of tissue expander either via open thoracotomy or thoracoscopically in an attempt to shift the mediastinum back to its anatomical location. Such surgical procedure involving the implantation of tissue expander for treating pulmonary agenesis was first reported in Berlin, Germany which was then followed by reports from Bordeaux, France and Verona, Italy. The main focus of the treatment procedure is to preserve the remaining functional tissue and prevent significant musculoskeletal disfigurement that may arise as a side effect of tissue expander implantation, as the mediastinal and skeletal shift towards the volume-loss side.

If the defect is extensive but there is a chance for the fetus to live, an exo-utero intrapartum treatment (EXIT) may be performed to salvage the potential life. EXIT technique involves partial delivery of a baby through an incision in the uterus while remaining attached to their mother's placenta. Such procedure is necessary for babies who require airway support so that they are provided with a functioning airway before they are detached from their mother's placenta. The EXIT procedure is used to perform lung resection for babies with extensive lung defects in a relatively stabilized condition after birth.

== Prognosis ==
Prognosis of pulmonary agenesis depends on the degree of pulmonary involvement during the embryonic stage of lung development, as well as the patient's history of pulmonary infections and the presence of associated anomalies. The majority of patients diagnosed with bilateral pulmonary agenesis die in utero or within the first few hours after birth. Numerous cases of bilateral pulmonary agenesis, where both lungs have been affected, have been reported previously. On the other hand, the hypertrophy of the remaining lung to compensate for the lost lung is common in the case of unilateral pulmonary agenesis. However, the mortality rate still exceeds 50%. Most causes of death are because of the presence of associated anomalies and malformations, which are common for pulmonary agenesis especially involving right-sided defects. Those suffering right-sided defects normally have poorer prognosis than those with left-sided defects, partly because the right side of the lung is usually more prone to infection considering the standard anatomical position of right bronchus, and also because cases with right-sided lung disorders have shown higher association rates with other anomalies. In fact, it has been suggested that right-sided defects produce a more severe mediastinal shift, distorting the trachea and great vessels.

== History ==
Pulmonary agenesis was a confusing term before Boyden's classification was published. Before that, the term agenesis was used frequently when reporting cases related to underdeveloped lungs, regardless of the degree of the underdevelopment. In 1955, Boyden classified pulmonary agenesis into 3 groups: agenesis, aplasia, and hypoplasia, which has been adopted by most researchers nowadays. As a clarification, the term “pulmonary agenesis” in this Wikipedia page will only be referring to the agenesis in Boyden's classification, hence the information contained may not be valid for pulmonary aplasia or hypoplasia unless specifically mentioned.

== See also ==
- Pulmonary hypoplasia
