= Bochdalek hernia =

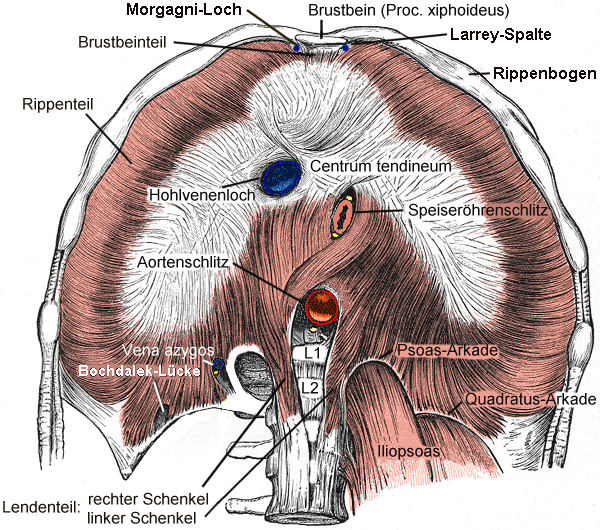
- "Bochdalek", at lumbocostal triangle, labeled in bottom left (Captions in German.)
- Specialty: Thoracic surgery
- Differential diagnosis: Diaphragmatic rupture
- Frequency: Rare

Bochdalek hernia is one of two forms of a congenital diaphragmatic hernia, the other form being Morgagni hernia. A Bochdalek hernia is a congenital abnormality in which an opening exists in the infant's diaphragm, allowing normally intra-abdominal organs (particularly the stomach and intestines) to enter into the thoracic cavity. In the majority of people, the affected lung will be deformed, and the resulting lung compression can be life-threatening. Bochdalek hernias occur more commonly on the posterior left side (85%, versus the right side 15%).

Bochdalek hernias are rare. This type of hernia was first described in 1754 by McCauley and subsequently studied and named after the Czech pathologist Vincenz Alexander Bochdalek (1801–1883).

== Signs and symptoms ==
=== Children ===
In normal Bochdalek hernia cases, the symptoms are often observable simultaneously with the baby's birth. A few of the symptoms of Bochdalek Hernia include difficulty breathing, fast respiration and increased heart rate. If the baby appears to have cyanosis (blue-tinted skin) this can also be a sign. Another way to identify a baby with Bochdalek hernia is to look at the chest immediately after birth. If the baby has a Bochdalek hernia it may appear that one side of the chest cavity is larger than the other and/or the abdomen seems to be caved in.

=== Adults ===
Symptoms rarely develop in adults. If symptoms do occur, they may be vague and related to the gastrointestinal tract. This may include pain or signs of a bowel obstruction.

== Causes ==
Most likely, Bochdalek hernias are formed throughout the growth process and organ construction during fetal development. During fetal development, the diaphragm is formed between the seventh and tenth week. Also, during this time, the esophagus, stomach, and intestines are formed. Therefore, a Bochdalek hernia forms either from malformation of the diaphragm, or the intestines become locked into the chest cavity during the construction of the diaphragm. Although these are some factors that contribute to a Bochdalek hernia, it does not take all variables into account. Bochdalek hernias, along with Morgagni hernias, are both multifactor conditions, meaning that there are many reasons and multiple variables that contribute to the malformations. For example, in each case, there could be genetic and or environmental condition(s) that can add to the probability of this birth defect.

== Treatment ==
=== Children ===
There are different pathways for treatment available. The first step in treatment includes the baby's admission into the NICU (Neonatal Intensive Care Unit). The preferred path of treatment for most Bochdalek Hernia is that babies who are admitted in the NICU, are placed on a mechanical ventilator to help breathing. Very rarely will the hernia be small enough that it is not noticed. It is more likely to be asymptomatic if it is on the right side of the chest. If the infant cannot be stabilized using medical treatments and mechanical ventilation, the alternate pathway involves putting the infants on a temporary heart/lung bypass machine, called ECMO, which stands for extra-corporeal membrane oxygenation. ECMO allows oxygen to be regulated into the blood and then pumps the blood throughout the entire body. Normally, this machine is used to stabilize the baby's condition. It is preferred to stabilize the infant prior to surgery, to minimize complications, if possible. The only treatment is surgery.

After the baby is stable and his or her state has improved, the diaphragm can be fixed and the misplaced organs can be relocated to their correct position. That is either done via primary repair where the remaining diaphragm is stretched to cover the hole, or an abdominal muscle is split so it can be used to stretch over the hole, and the last option is with a Gore-Tex patch, which has higher risks of later infection or re-herniation. Although these are various treatments for Bochdalek Hernias, it does not guarantee the baby will survive. Since the baby must go through some or all of the previous treatments, the baby's hospital stay is usually longer than that of a "normal" newborn. The average infants born with a Bochdalek Hernia stay in the hospital between 23.1 and 26.8 days.

=== Adults ===
If the disorder is diagnosed in an adult and they remain without symptoms no specific treatment is required. In those who are symptomatic surgery may be carried out by an open or closed approach.

== Prognosis ==
Bochdalek hernia can be a life-threatening condition. Approximately 85.3% of newborns born with a Bochdalek hernia are immediately high risk. Infants born with a Bochdalek hernia have a "high mortality rate due to respiratory insufficiency". Between 25 and 60% of infants with a Bochdalek hernia die. The lungs, diaphragm, and digestive system are all forming at the same time, so when a Bochdalek hernia permits the abdominal organs to invade the chest cavity rather than remain under the diaphragm in the correct position, it puts the infant in critical condition. These "foreign bodies" in the chest cavity compress the lungs, impairing their proper development and causing pulmonary hypoplasia. Since the lungs of infants suffering from a Bochdalek hernia have fewer alveoli than normal lungs, Bochdalek hernias are life-threatening conditions due to respiratory distress.

More individualized prognosis for infants depends on several factors, including where the infant is born, the amount of herniation into the thoracic cavity, whether the liver is in the thorax as well, and other malformations including heart defects.

- Some institutions use a ratio called the Lung to Head Ratio (LHR) which is calculated by measuring the size of the infant's head, comparing it to the size of the observed volume of lung. An LHR >1.0 is associated with higher survival.
- Other institutions use the Observed to Expected LHR (O/E LHR), which compares the expected ratio of size of the lungs for the fetus's gestation and other measurements, in comparison to what the observed ratio of size is for their lungs/head. When using the O/E LHR, the mildest form is >35%, signifying less difference between observed to expected. Moderate is considered 25-35%, and severe is <25%.

For best outcomes, the fetus should be diagnosed prenatally and delivered at a tertiary hospital with ECMO capabilities. Different centers manage differently and have different outcomes. Some families temporarily relocate to be at the CDH surgical center of choice.

== Epidemiology ==
Bochdalek hernias make up about 0.17% to 6% of all diaphragmatic hernia cases when they appear spontaneously in adults and about one in every 2200 to 12,500 births every year. Babies who are born with a Bochdalek hernia are more than likely to have another birth defect caused by the hernia. About twenty percent of those children born with a Bochdalek hernia, also have a congenital heart defect. In addition, infants born with this condition may also have other abnormalities. "Between five and sixteen [percent of infants] have a chromosomal abnormality." In most cases, left-sided hernias or Bochdalek hernias have a ratio of 3:2 of males to females. In other words, Bochdalek hernias are more common in men.
