= Vincent Bochdalek =

Czech anatomist (1801–1883)

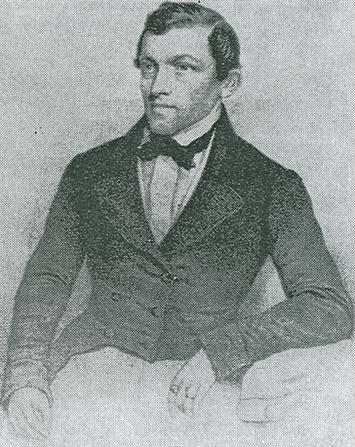
- Vincent Bochdalek
- Born: 11 February 1801; Skřipov, Austrian Silesia
- Died: 3 February 1883 (aged 81)
- Scientific career
- Fields: anatomy

Vincent Alexander Bochdalek (also Vincenc or Vincenz; 11 February 1801 – 3 February 1883) was a Czech anatomist and pathologist. Bochdalek was elected as member of the German Academy of Sciences Leopoldina.

== Biography ==
Bochdalek was born in Skřipov on 11 February 1801. He graduated from the gymnasium in Opava. He obtained his doctorate in 1833 in Prague, where he was later professor of anatomy for several decades. He retired in 1874, settling in Litoměřice and later dying in Litoměřice on 3 February 1883. His son, Viktor Bochdalek (1835–1868), became a prominent physician in his own right.

== Associated eponyms ==
- Bochdalek's cyst: a congenital cyst at the root of the tongue.
- Bochdalek's flower basket: part of the choroid plexus of the fourth ventricle protruding through the lateral bursa (recessus lateralis) of the fourth ventricle (Luschka's foramen).
- Bochdalek's foramen: a congenital defective opening through the diaphragm, connecting pleural and peritoneal cavities.
- Bochdalek's ganglion: a ganglion of dental nerve in the jaw (maxilla) above the root of the canine teeth.
- Bochdalek's hernia: Congenital diaphragmatic hernia which allows protrusion of abdominal viscera into the chest.
- Bochdalek's triangle: the lumbocostal triangle, a triangle-shaped slit in the muscle plate between lumbar and costal part in the diaphragm and the 12th rib.
- Bochdalek's valve: a fold of membrane in the lacrimal duct near the punctum lacrimale. Another name for this structure is Foltz' valvule; named after French ophthalmologist Jean Charles Eugène Foltz (1822–1876).
- Vater's duct: a duct that in the embryo connects the thyroid diverticulum and the posterior part of the tongue.

== Bibliography ==
- Anleitung zur praktischen Zergliederung des menschlichen Gehirns nebst einer anatomischen Beschreibung desselben mit besonderer Rücksicht auf das kleine Gehirn. 1833.
- Neue Untersuchungen und genaue Würdigung der Nerven des Ober- und Unterkiefers.
- Medizinische Jahrbücher des kaiserlich-königlichen österreichischen Staates, Vienna 1836, 19: 223–240. (With the description of the ganglion supramaxillare)
