= Mary Shepherd =

Mary Shepherd may refer to:

- Lady Mary Shepherd (1777–1847), Scottish philosopher
- Mary Patricia Shepherd (1933–2003), British thoracic surgeon
- Mary Shepherd-Sunderland, in the horror anthology media franchise Silent Hill, voiced by Monica Taylor Horgan

== See also ==
- Mary Shepard (1909–2000), English illustrator of children's books
- Mary Shepard Greene (1869–1958), American artist, illustrator, and jewelry designer
