= Pulmonary hypoplasia =

Congenital disorder of respiratory system

- Other names: Familial primary pulmonary hypoplasia
- This condition is inherited in an autosomal recessive manner
- Specialty: Pulmonology

Pulmonary hypoplasia is an incomplete development of the lungs, resulting in an abnormally low number or small size of bronchopulmonary segments or alveoli. A congenital malformation, most often occurs secondary to other fetal abnormalities that interfere with normal development of the lungs. Primary (idiopathic) pulmonary hypoplasia is rare and usually not associated with other maternal or fetal abnormalities.

Incidence of pulmonary hypoplasia ranges from 9–11 per 10,000 live births and 14 per 10,000 births. Pulmonary hypoplasia is a relatively common cause of neonatal death. It also is a common finding in stillbirths, although not regarded as a cause of these.

== Causes ==
Causes of pulmonary hypoplasia include a wide variety of congenital malformations and other conditions in which pulmonary hypoplasia is a complication. These include congenital diaphragmatic hernia, congenital cystic adenomatoid malformation, fetal hydronephrosis, caudal regression syndrome, mediastinal tumor, and sacrococcygeal teratoma with a large component inside the fetus. Large masses of the neck (such as cervical teratoma) can also cause pulmonary hypoplasia, presumably by interfering with the fetus's ability to fill its lungs. In the presence of pulmonary hypoplasia, the EXIT procedure to rescue a baby with a neck mass is not likely to succeed.

Fetal hydrops can be a cause, or conversely a complication.

Pulmonary hypoplasia is associated with oligohydramnios through multiple mechanisms. Both conditions can result from blockage of the urinary bladder. Blockage prevents the bladder from emptying, and the bladder becomes very large and full. The large volume of the full bladder interferes with the normal development of other organs, including the lungs. Pressure within the bladder becomes abnormally high, causing abnormal function in the kidneys; hence, abnormally high pressure in the vascular system enters the kidneys. This high pressure also interferes with normal development of other organs. An experiment in rabbits showed that PH also can be caused directly by oligohydramnios.

Pulmonary hypoplasia is associated with dextrocardia of embryonic arrest in that both conditions can result from early errors of development, resulting in Congenital cardiac disorders.

PH is a common direct cause of neonatal death resulting from pregnancy induced hypertension.

== Diagnosis ==
Medical diagnosis of pulmonary hypoplasia in utero may use imaging, usually ultrasound or MRI. The extent of hypoplasia is a very important prognostic factor. One study of 147 fetuses (49 normal, 98 with abnormalities) found that a simple measurement, the ratio of chest length to trunk (torso) length, was a useful predictor of postnatal respiratory distress. In a study of 23 fetuses, subtle differences seen on MRIs of the lungs were informative. In a study of 29 fetuses with suspected pulmonary hypoplasia, the group that responded to maternal oxygenation had a more favorable outcome.

Pulmonary hypoplasia is diagnosed also clinically.

== Management ==
Management has three components: interventions before delivery, timing and place of delivery, and therapy after delivery.

In some cases, fetal therapy is available for the underlying condition; this may help to limit the severity of pulmonary hypoplasia. In exceptional cases, fetal therapy may include fetal surgery.

A 1992 case report of a baby with a sacrococcygeal teratoma (SCT) reported that the SCT had obstructed the outlet of the urinary bladder causing the bladder to rupture in utero and fill the baby's abdomen with urine (a form of ascites). The outcome was good. The baby had normal kidneys and lungs, leading the authors to conclude that obstruction occurred late in the pregnancy and to suggest that the rupture may have protected the baby from the usual complications of such an obstruction. Subsequent to this report, use of a vesicoamniotic shunting procedure (VASP) has been attempted, with limited success.

Often, a baby with a high risk of pulmonary hypoplasia will have a planned delivery in a specialty hospital such as (in the United States) a tertiary referral hospital with a level 3 neonatal intensive-care unit. The baby may require immediate advanced resuscitation and therapy.

Early delivery may be required in order to rescue the fetus from an underlying condition that is causing pulmonary hypoplasia. However, pulmonary hypoplasia increases the risks associated with preterm birth, because once delivered the baby requires adequate lung capacity to sustain life. The decision whether to deliver early includes a careful assessment of the extent to which delaying delivery may increase or decrease the pulmonary hypoplasia. It is a choice between expectant management and active management. An example is congenital cystic adenomatoid malformation with hydrops; impending heart failure may require a preterm delivery. Severe oligohydramnios of early onset and long duration, as can occur with early preterm rupture of membranes, can cause increasingly severe PH; if delivery is postponed by many weeks, PH can become so severe that it results in neonatal death.

After delivery, most affected babies will require supplemental oxygen. Some severely affected babies may be saved with extracorporeal membrane oxygenation (ECMO). Not all specialty hospitals have ECMO, and ECMO is considered the therapy of last resort for pulmonary insufficiency. An alternative to ECMO is high-frequency oscillatory ventilation.

== History ==
In 1908, Maude Abbott documented pulmonary hypoplasia occurring with certain defects of the heart. In 1915, Abbott and J. C. Meakins showed that pulmonary hypoplasia was part of the differential diagnosis of dextrocardia. In 1920, decades before the advent of prenatal imaging, the presence of pulmonary hypoplasia was taken as evidence that diaphragmatic hernias in babies were congenital, not acquired.

== See also ==
- Pulmonary agenesis
- Potter sequence
- Prune belly syndrome
