= Skřipov =

- Municipality
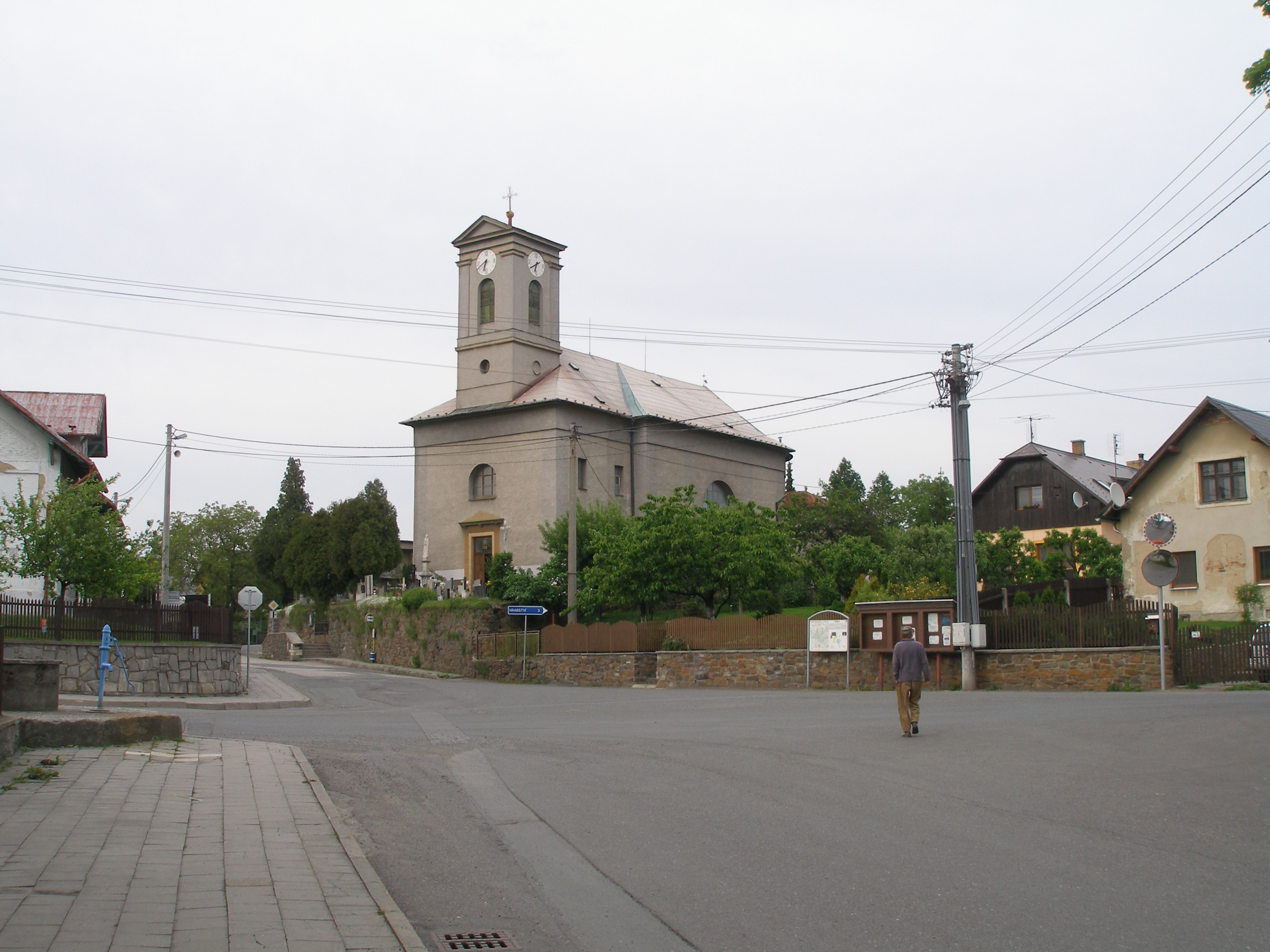
- Common with the Church of Saint John the Baptist

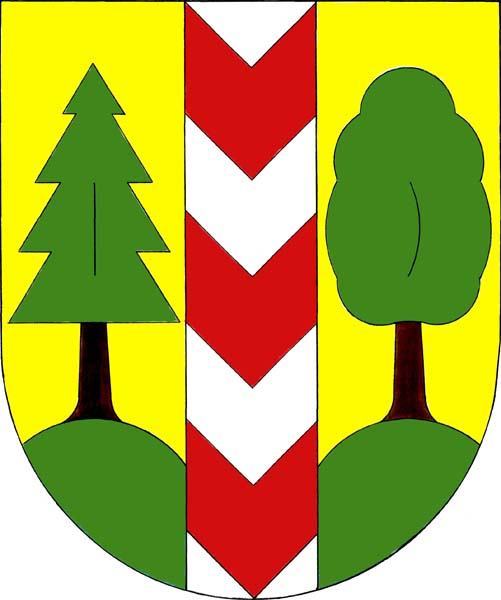
- Flag Coat of arms

- Location in the Czech Republic
- Coordinates: 49°49′7″N 17°54′38″E
- Country: Czech Republic
- Region: Moravian-Silesian
- District: Opava
- First mentioned: 1271

Area
  - Total: 20.22 km^{2} (7.81 sq mi)
- Elevation: 445 m (1,460 ft)

Population (2026-01-01)
  - Total: 1,025
  - Density: 50.69/km^{2} (131.3/sq mi)
- Time zone: UTC+1 (CET)
  - Summer (DST): UTC+2 (CEST)
- Postal code: 747 45
- Website: www.ouskripov.eu

Skřipov (German: Skrezipp) is a municipality and village in Opava District in the Moravian-Silesian Region of the Czech Republic. It has about 1,000 inhabitants.

== Administrative division ==
Skřipov consists of two municipal parts (in brackets population according to the 2021 census):

- Skřipov (692)
- Hrabství (287)

== History ==
The first written mention of Skřipov is from 1271.

The first written mention of Hrabství is from 1460. Until 1916, it was a municipal part of Výškovice (which is today a part of Bílovec). In 1916, it became a separate municipality. In 1979, Skřipov and Hrabství were merged into one municipality.

== Demographics ==
Historical population
Year	Pop.	±%
1869	1,157	—
1880	1,175	+1.6%
1890	1,183	+0.7%
1900	1,197	+1.2%
1910	1,265	+5.7%
1921	1,139	−10.0%
1930	1,176	+3.2%
1950	904	−23.1%
1961	1,041	+15.2%
1970	1,038	−0.3%
1980	1,077	+3.8%
1991	1,030	−4.4%
2001	1,009	−2.0%
2011	976	−3.3%
2021	979	+0.3%
Source: Censuses

== Notable people ==
- Vincent Bochdalek (1801–1883), anatomist and pathologist
