= Lumbocostal triangle =

Region of the diaphragm

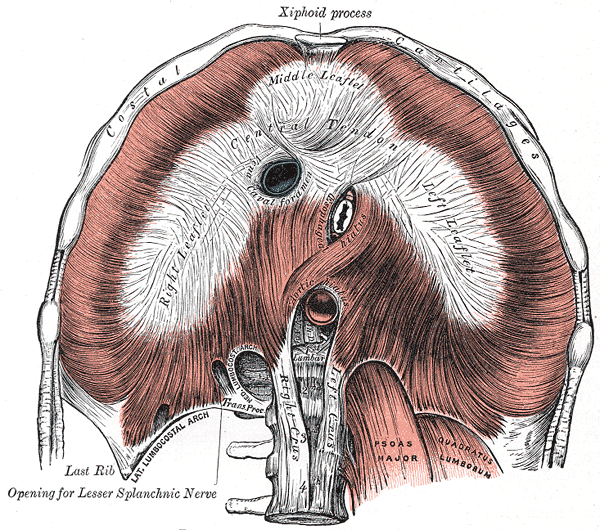
- The diaphragm. Under surface. (Lumbocostal triangle not labeled, but costal and lumbar regions are visible)

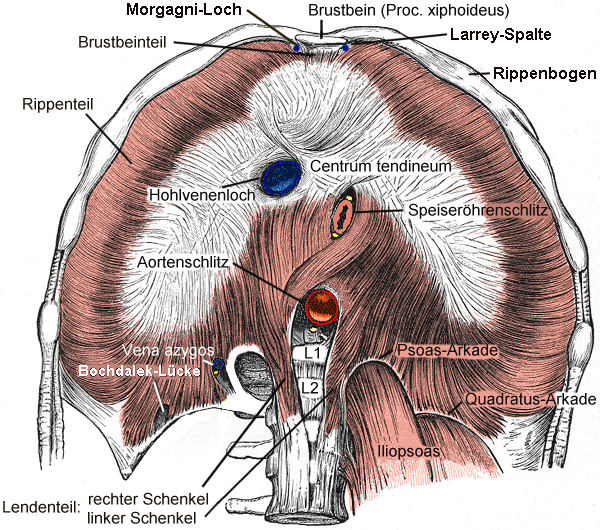
- With captions (labels in German)

Details

Identifiers
- Latin: trigonum lumbocostale
- TA98: A04.4.02.016
- FMA: 58353

The lumbocostal triangle (also Bochdalek's foramen, Bochdalek's triangle) is a space between the costal and lumbar parts of the diaphragm. The base of this triangular space is formed by muscle attachments originating from the XII rib and muscle fibers attaching to the lateral arcuate ligament. The apex of the triangle is oriented towards the tendinous centre of the diaphragm. Parietal pleura and renal capsule are in contact in this space, so possible infection can be transmitted through this space.

== Clinical significance ==
The existence of this foramen might cause a congenital diaphragmatic hernia, Bochdalek hernia.

This condition has also been associated with thoracic kidney, the presence of the kidney in the thorax instead of the usual abdominal position.
