= Mary Patricia Shepherd =

Thoracic surgeon (1933–2003)

Mary Patricia Shepherd (4 July 1933 – 20 October 2003) was a British thoracic surgeon who worked at Harefield Hospital in London. She is known for her research on plombage, membrane oxygenation, and diaphragmatic grafts.

== Biography ==
Mary Shepherd was born on 4 July 1933 in Forest Hill, London. Her father was George Raymond Shepherd, an engineer, and her mother was Florence May Savile, who came from a medical family. The family spent a year in Maryland when George took up an American work assignment. Mary was awarded a scholarship to James Allen's Girls' School in 1946 and graduated from the Royal Free Hospital School of Medicine in 1957 after winning several prizes in surgery. After qualifying, she continued to work at the Royal Free Hospital as a house surgeon and a surgical registrar.

In 1963, Shepherd became a registrar at Harefield Hospital, where she would remain for the rest of her career as a consultant in thoracic surgery. After gaining her fellowship of the Royal College of Surgeons in 1964, she spent a year at The Hospital for Sick Children in Toronto in 1966–67, working alongside William Thornton Mustard. They co-authored papers on membrane oxygenation (a type of cardiopulmonary bypass) and diaphragmatic pedicle grafts; her work on the latter formed her thesis for an MS awarded in 1972. Her most influential research work was on plombage, which she published in a landmark paper in Thorax in 1985.

After retiring in 1985, Shepherd divided her time between Southwold in Suffolk and Cape Cod in the United States. She died on 20 October 2003 from thyroid cancer.
