= Diaphragmatic hernia =

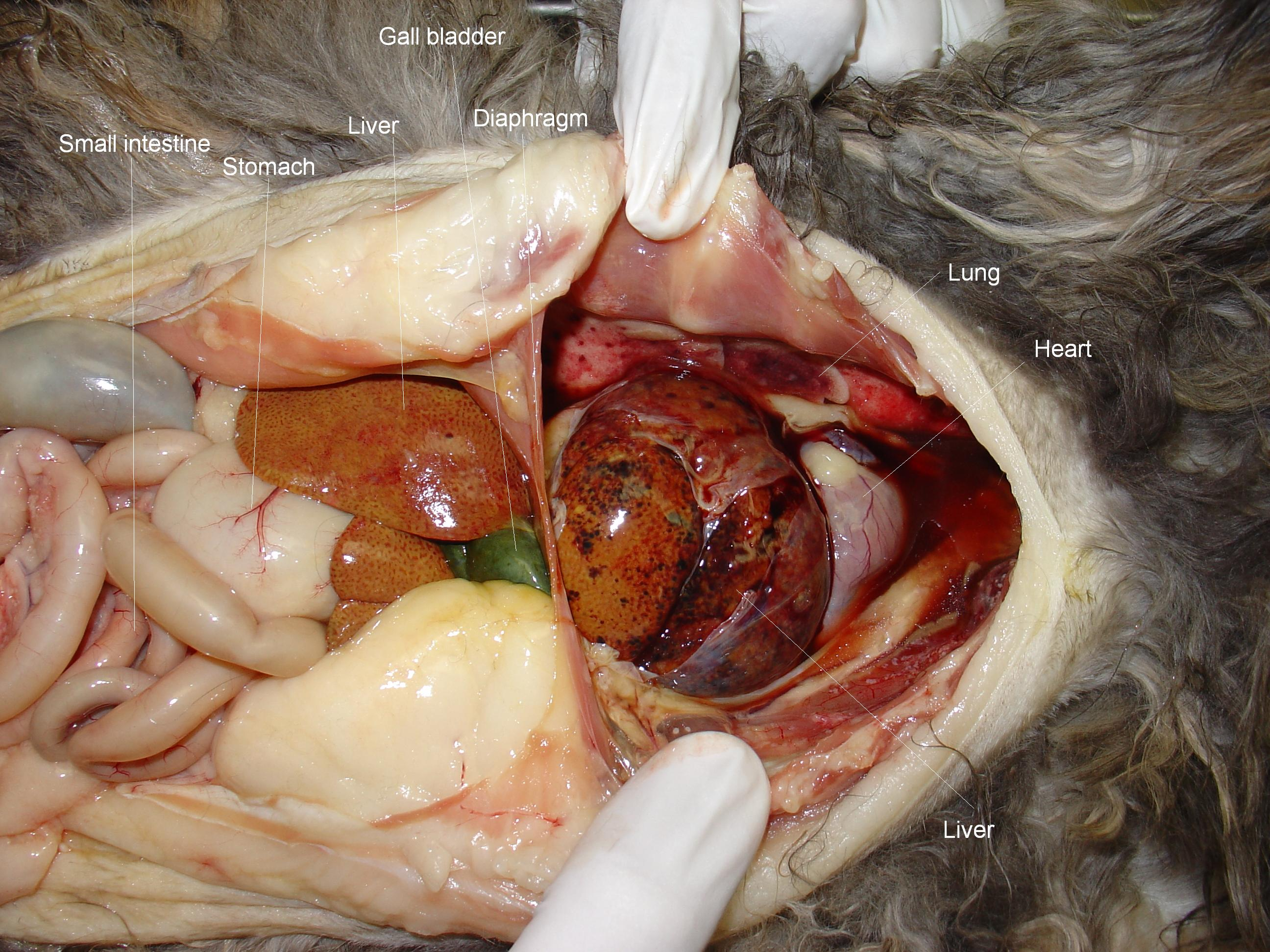
- This is a photo of a peritoneopericardial diaphragmatic hernia in a cat. The photo was taken during necropsy from the right side of the cat. To the left is the abdomen, where part of the liver and the gall bladder can be seen. The diaphragm is in the middle. To the right is the thorax. The largest object seen in the thorax is the rest of the liver. Just to the right of that is the heart. The liver was connected to itself through a small hole in the diaphragm (not seen).
- Specialty: Gastroenterology

Diaphragmatic hernia is a defect or hole in the diaphragm that allows the abdominal contents to move into the chest cavity. Treatment is usually surgical.

== Types ==
- Congenital diaphragmatic hernia
  - Morgagni's hernia
  - Bochdalek hernia
- Hiatal hernia
- Iatrogenic diaphragmatic hernia
- Traumatic diaphragmatic hernia

== Signs and symptoms ==
A scaphoid abdomen (sucked inwards) may be the presenting symptom in a newborn.

== Diagnosis ==
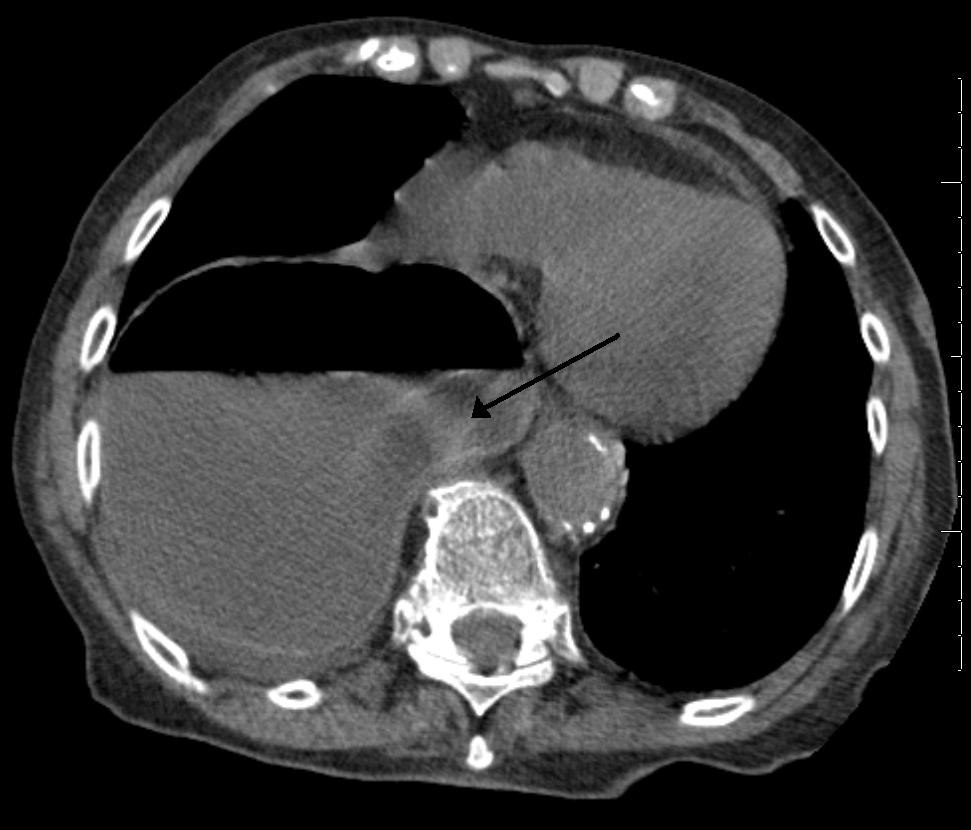
A right sided diaphragmatic hernia with the stomach in the chest (left side of image marked by the arrow). Note the air fluid level in the stomach.

Diagnosis can be made by either CT or X-ray.

== Treatment ==
Treatment for a diaphragmatic hernia usually involves surgery, with acute injuries often repaired with monofilament permanent sutures.

== Other animals ==
Peritoneopericardial diaphragmatic hernia is a type of hernia more common in other mammals. This is usually treated with surgery.
