= Diaphragmatic rupture =

Tear in the thoracic diaphragm

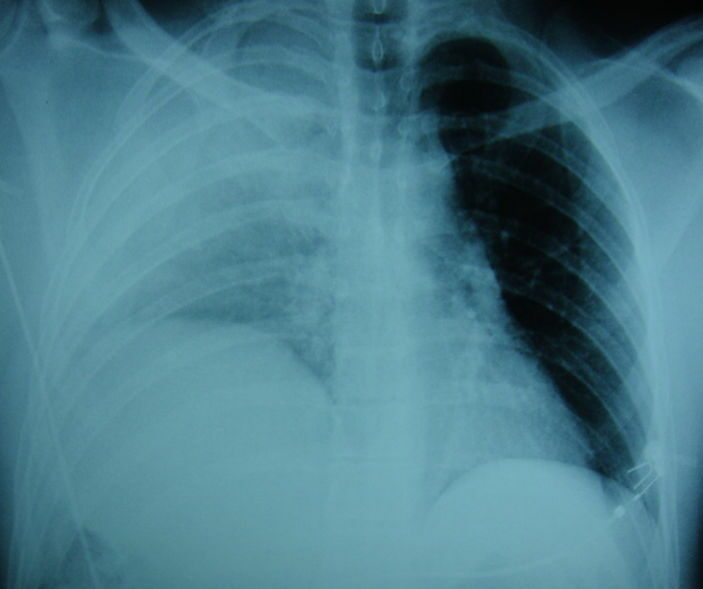
- An X-ray showing a raised diaphragm on the right
- Specialty: Cardiothoracic surgery
- Symptoms: Difficulty breathing, chest pain
- Causes: Trauma
- Diagnostic method: Laparotomy, CT scan, X-ray
- Treatment: Surgery
- Prognosis: 15–40% mortality rate

Diaphragmatic rupture (also called diaphragmatic injury or tear) is a tear of the diaphragm, the muscle across the bottom of the ribcage that plays a crucial role in breathing. Most commonly, acquired diaphragmatic tears result from physical trauma. Diaphragmatic rupture can result from blunt or penetrating trauma and occurs in about 0.5% of all people with trauma.

Diagnostic techniques include X-ray, computed tomography, and surgical techniques such as an explorative surgery. Diagnosis is often difficult because signs may not show up on X-ray, or signs that do show up appear similar to other conditions. Signs and symptoms include chest and abdominal pain, difficulty breathing, and decreased lung sounds. When a tear is discovered, surgery is needed to repair it.

Injuries to the diaphragm are usually accompanied by other injuries, and they indicate that more severe injury may have occurred. The outcome often depends more on associated injuries than on the diaphragmatic injury itself. Since the pressure is higher in the abdominal cavity than the chest cavity, rupture of the diaphragm is almost always associated with herniation of abdominal organs into the chest cavity, which is called a diaphragmatic hernia. This herniation can interfere with breathing.

== Signs and symptoms ==
Symptoms may include pain, orthopnea, (shortness of breath when lying flat), and coughing. In people with herniation of abdominal organs, signs of intestinal blockage or sepsis in the abdomen may be present. Bowel sounds may be heard in the chest, and shoulder or epigastric pain may be present. When the injury is not noticed right away, the main symptoms are those that indicate bowel obstruction.

== Causes ==
Diaphragmatic rupture may be caused by blunt trauma, penetrating trauma, and by iatrogenic causes (as a result of medical intervention), for example during surgery to the abdomen or chest. It has also occurred spontaneously at the time of pregnancy or for no discernible reason. Injury to the diaphragm is reported to be present in 8% of cases of blunt chest trauma. In cases of blunt trauma, vehicle accidents and falls are the most common causes. Penetrating trauma has been reported to cause 12.3–20% of cases, but it has also been proposed as a more common cause than blunt trauma; discrepancies could be due to varying regional, social, and economic factors in the areas studied. Stab and gunshot wounds can cause diaphragmatic injuries. Clinicians are trained to suspect diaphragmatic rupture particularly if penetrating trauma has occurred to the lower chest or upper abdomen. With penetrating trauma, the contents of the abdomen may not herniate into the chest cavity right away, but they may do so later, causing the presentation to be delayed. Since the diaphragm moves up and down during breathing, penetrating trauma to various parts of the torso may injure the diaphragm; penetrating injuries as high as the third rib and as low as the twelfth have been found to injure the diaphragm. Iatrogenic cases have occurred as a complication of medical procedures involving the thorax or abdomen. It has occurred as a complication of thoracentesis and radiofrequency ablation.

== Mechanism ==
Although the mechanism is unknown, it is proposed that a blow to the abdomen may raise the pressure within the abdomen so high that the diaphragm ruptures. Blunt trauma creates a large pressure gradient between the abdominal and thoracic cavities; this gradient, in addition to causing the rupture, can also cause abdominal contents to herniate into the thoracic cavity. Abdominal contents in the pleural space interfere with heart function and lung function. High intrathoracic pressure results in an increase in right atrial pressure, disrupting the filling of the heart and venous return of blood. As venous return determines cardiac output, this results in a reduction of cardiac output. If ventilation of the lung on the side of the tear is severely inhibited, hypoxemia (low blood oxygen) results. Usually, the rupture is on the same side as an impact. A blow to the side is three times more likely to cause diaphragmatic rupture than a blow to the front.

== Diagnosis ==
Physical examinations are not accurate, as there is usually no specific physical sign that can be used to diagnose this condition. Thoracoscopic and laparoscopic methods can be accurate. Chest X-ray is known to be unreliable in diagnosing diaphragmatic rupture; it has low sensitivity and specificity for the injury. Often another injury such as pulmonary contusion masks the injury on the X-ray film. Half the time, initial X-rays are normal; in most of those that are not, hemothorax or pneumothorax is present. A nasogastric tube from the stomach may appear on the film in the chest cavity; this sign is pathognomonic for diaphragmatic rupture, but it is rare. The X-ray is better able to detect the injury when taken from the back with the person upright, but this is not usually possible because the person is usually not stable enough; thus it is usually taken from the front with the person lying supine. Positive pressure ventilation helps keep the abdominal organs from herniating into the chest cavity, but this also can prevent the injury from being discovered on an X-ray.

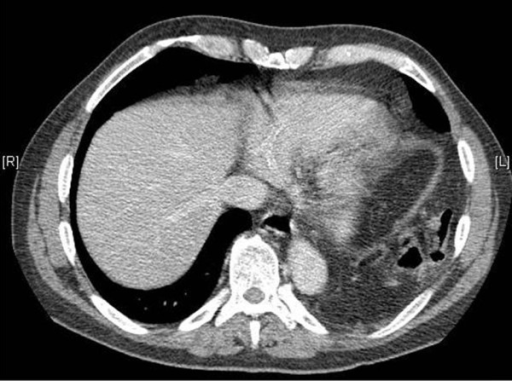
Axial lower chest CT scan showing bowel herniation due to left diaphragmatic rupture

A CT scan has an increased accuracy of diagnosis over X-ray, but no specific findings on a CT scan exist to establish a diagnosis. The free edge of a ruptured diaphragm may curl and become perpendicular to the chest wall, a sign known as a dangling diaphragm. A herniated organ may constrict at the location of a rupture, a sign known as the collar sign. If the liver herniates through a rupture on the right side, it may produce two signs known as the hump and band signs. The hump sign is a form of the collar sign on the right. The band sign is a bright line that intersects the liver. it is believed to result due to the ruptured diaphragm compressing. Although CT scanning increases chances that diaphragmatic rupture will be diagnosed before surgery, the rate of diagnosis before surgery is still only 31–43.5%. Another diagnostic method is laparotomy, but this misses diaphragmatic ruptures up to 15% of the time. Often diaphragmatic injury is discovered during a laparotomy that was undertaken because of another abdominal injury. Because laparotomies are more common in those with penetrating trauma than compared to those who experienced a blunt force injury, diaphragmatic rupture is found more often in these people. Thoracoscopy is more reliable in detecting diaphragmatic tears than laparotomy and is especially useful when chronic diaphragmatic hernia is suspected.

=== Location ===
Between 50 and 80% of diaphragmatic ruptures occur on the left side. It is possible that the liver, which is situated in the right upper quadrant of the abdomen, cushions the diaphragm. However, injuries occurring on the left side are also easier to detect in X-ray films. Half of diaphragmatic ruptures that occur on the right side are associated with liver injury. Injuries occurring on the right are associated with a higher rate of death and more numerous and serious accompanying injuries. Bilateral diaphragmatic rupture, which occurs in 1–2% of ruptures, is associated with a much higher death rate (mortality) than injuries that occur on just one side.

== Treatment ==
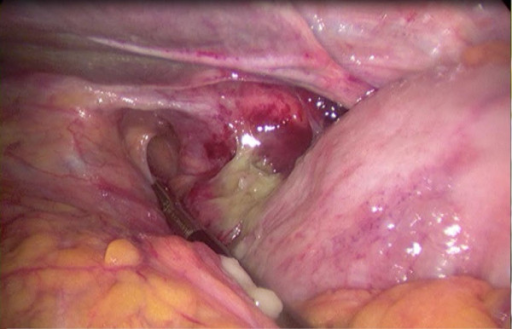
Left posterior diaphragmatic rupture undergoing surgery

Since the diaphragm is in constant motion with respiration, and because it is under tension, lacerations will not heal on their own. The injury usually becomes larger with time if not repaired. The main goals of surgery are to repair any injuries to the diaphragm and to move any herniated abdominal organs back to their original place. This is done by debriding nonviable tissue and closing the rupture. Most of the time, the injury is repaired during laparotomy. Early surgery is important, as diaphragmatic atrophy and adhesions occur over time. Sutures are used in the repair. Other injuries, such as hemothorax, may present a more immediate threat and may need to be treated first if they accompany diaphragmatic rupture. Video-assisted thoracoscopy may be used.

== Prognosis ==
In most cases, isolated diaphragmatic rupture is associated with good outcome if it is surgically repaired. The death rate (mortality) for diaphragmatic rupture after blunt and penetrating trauma is estimated to be 15–40% and 10–30% respectively, but other injuries play a large role in determining outcome. Herniation of abdominal organs is present in 3–4% of people with abdominal trauma who present to a trauma center.

== Epidemiology ==
Diaphragmatic injuries are present in 1–7% of people with significant blunt trauma and an average of 3% of abdominal injuries. A high body mass index may be associated with a higher risk of diaphragmatic rupture in people involved in vehicle accidents. Over 90% occur due to trauma from vehicle accidents. Due to the great force needed to rupture the diaphragm, it is rare for the diaphragm alone to be injured, especially in blunt trauma; other injuries are associated in as many as 80–100% of cases. In fact, if the diaphragm is injured, it is an indication that more severe injuries to organs may have occurred. Thus, the mortality after a diagnosis of diaphragmatic rupture is 17%, with most deaths due to lung complications. Common associated injuries include head injury, injuries to the aorta, fractures of the pelvis and long bones, and lacerations of the liver and spleen. Associated injuries can occur in over three quarters of cases.

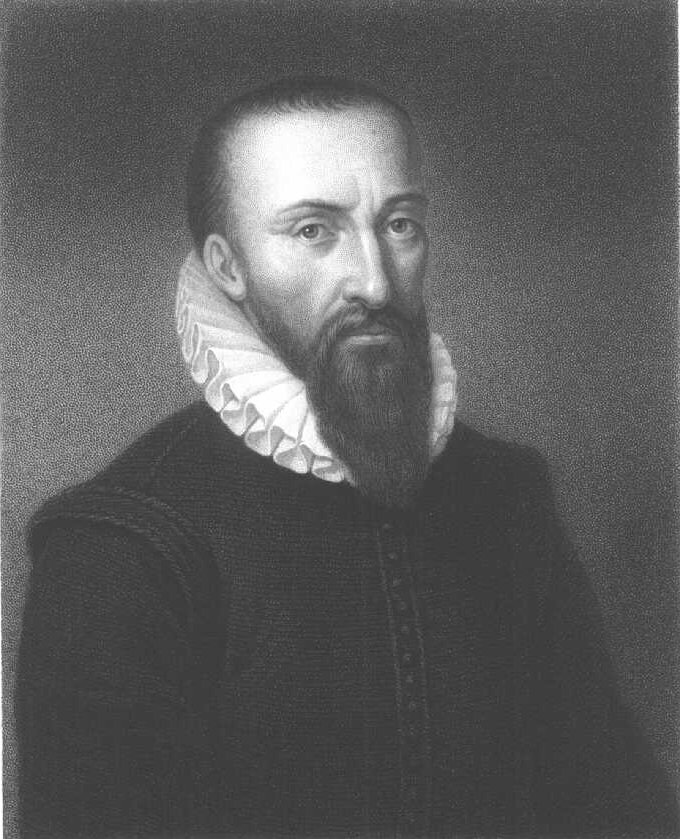
Ambroise Paré

== History ==
In 1579, Ambroise Paré made the first description of diaphragmatic rupture in a French artillery captain who had been shot eight months before his death. He died from complications of the rupture. Using autopsies, Paré also described diaphragmatic rupture in people who had suffered blunt and penetrating trauma. Reports of diaphragmatic herniation due to injury date back at least as far as the 17th century. Petit was the first to establish the difference between acquired and congenital diaphragmatic hernia, which results from a congenital malformation of the diaphragm. In 1888, Naumann repaired a hernia of the stomach into the left chest that was caused by trauma.

== Other animals ==
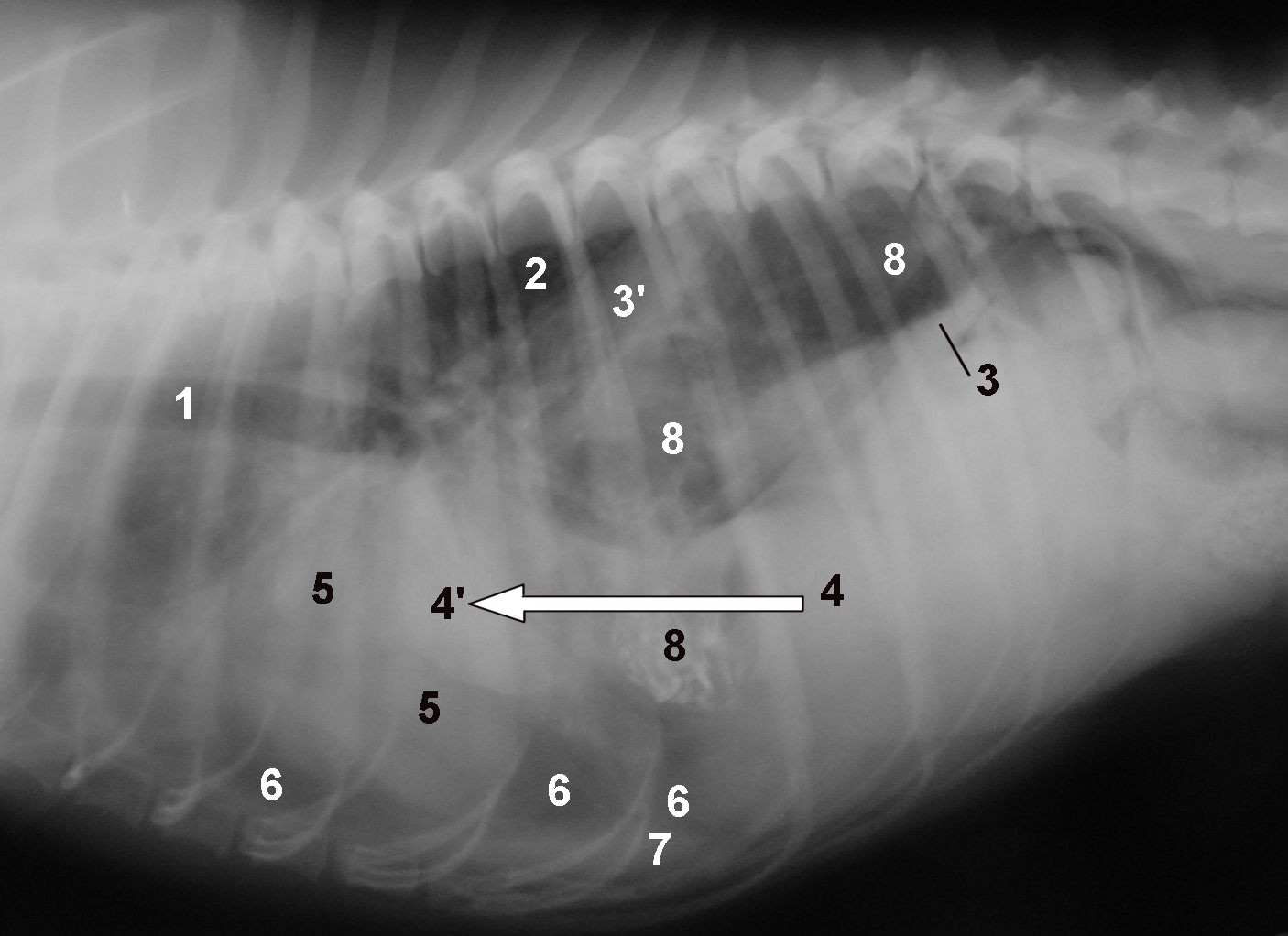
Diaphragmatic rupture in a dog

Diaphragmatic rupture is a common and well-known complication of blunt abdominal trauma in cats and dogs. The organs that herniate into the pleural cavity are determined by the location of the rupture. They are most commonly circumferential tears that occur at the attachment of the diaphragm and rib. Is these cases, the organs that herniate may include the liver, small intestine, stomach, spleen, omentum, and/or uterus. Dorsal tears are uncommon, and may cause a kidney to herniate into the thorax. Symptoms include difficulty breathing, vomiting, collapse, and an absence of palpable organs in the abdomen. Symptoms can worsen quickly and be lethal, especially in the case of severe bleeding, bruised heart, or strangulation of herniated intestine. It is also possible that there may only be subtle signs, and the condition is only incidentally detected months to years after the injury during a medical scan.

== See also ==
- Diaphragmatic hernia
- Chest injury
