= Pulmonary sequestration =

- Other names: Bronchopulmonary sequestration or cystic lung lesion
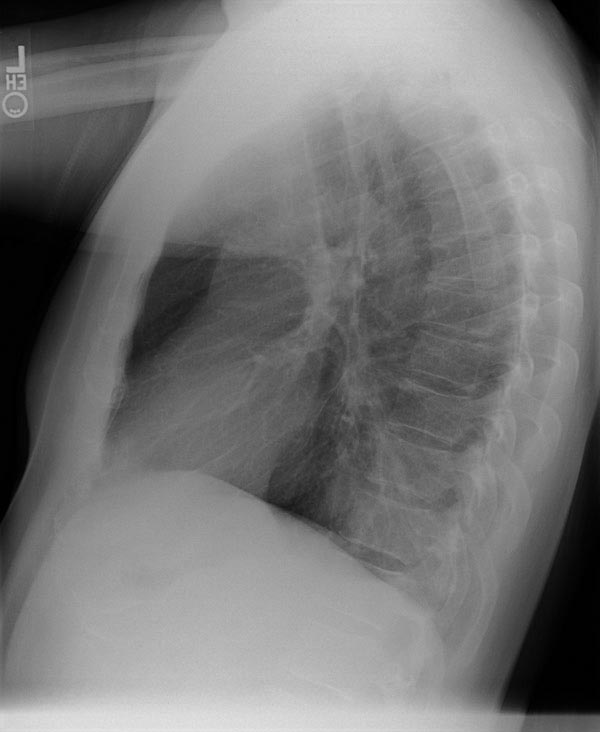
- Specialty: Pulmonology

A pulmonary sequestration is a medical condition wherein a piece of tissue that ultimately develops into lung tissue is not attached to the pulmonary arterial blood supply, as is the case in normally developing lung. This sequestered tissue is therefore not connected to the normal bronchial airway architecture, and fails to function in, and contribute to, respiration of the organism.

This condition is usually diagnosed in children and is generally thought to be congenital in nature. More and more, these lesions are diagnosed in utero by prenatal ultrasound.

== Presentation ==
Symptoms can vary greatly, but they include a persistent dry cough.

=== Complications ===
Failure to have a pulmonary sequestration removed can lead to a number of complications. These include:

- Potentially fatal hemorrhage
- The creation of a left-right shunt, where blood flows in a shortcut through the feed off the aorta
- Chronic infection with diseases such as
  - Bronchiectasis
  - Tuberculosis
  - Aspergillosis
  - Bronchial carcinoid
  - Bronchogenic squamous cell carcinoma

== Cause ==
There is still much debate to whether pulmonary sequestration is a congenital problem or acquired through recurrent pulmonary infection. It is widely believed that extralobar pulmonary sequestrations are a result of prenatal pulmonary malformation while intralobar pulmonary sequestrations can develop due to recurrent pulmonary infections in adolescents and young adults. The most frequently supported theory of sequestration formation involves an accessory lung bud that develops from the ventral aspect of the primitive foregut. The pluripotential tissue from this additional lung bud migrates in a caudal direction with the normally developing lung. It receives its blood supply from vessels that connect to the aorta and cover the primitive foregut. These attachments to the aorta remain to form the systemic arterial supply of the sequestration. Early embryologic development of the accessory lung bud results in formation of the sequestration within normal lung tissue. The sequestration is encased within the same pleural covering. This is the intrapulmonary variant. In contrast, later development of the accessory lung bud results in the extrapulmonary type that may give rise to communication with the GI tract. Both types of sequestration usually have arterial supply from the thoracic or abdominal aorta. Rarely, the celiac axis, internal mammary, subclavian, or renal artery may be involved. Intrapulmonary sequestration occurs within the visceral pleura of normal lung tissue. Usually, no communication with the tracheobronchial tree occurs. The most common location is in the posterior basal segment, and nearly two thirds of pulmonary sequestrations appear in the left lung. Venous drainage is usually via the pulmonary veins. Foregut communication is very rare, and associated anomalies are uncommon. Extrapulmonary sequestration is completely enclosed in its own pleural sac. It may occur above, within, or below the diaphragm, and nearly all appear on the left side. No communication with the tracheobronchial tree occurs. Venous drainage is usually via the systemic venous system. Foregut communication and associated anomalies, such as diaphragmatic hernia, are more common.

== Diagnosis ==
Bronchopulmonary sequestration (BPS) is a rare congenital malformation of the lower respiratory tract. It consists of a nonfunctioning mass of normal lung tissue that lacks normal communication with the tracheobronchial tree, and that receives its arterial blood supply from the systemic circulation.

BPS is estimated to comprise one to six percent of all congenital pulmonary malformations, making it an extremely rare disorder.

Sequestrations are classified anatomically. Intralobar sequestration in which the lesion is located within a normal lobe and lacks its own visceral pleura. Extralobar sequestration in which the mass is located outside the normal lung and has its own visceral pleura. The blood supply of 75% of pulmonary sequestrations is derived from the thoracic or abdominal aorta. The remaining 25% of sequestrations receive their blood flow from the subclavian, intercostal, pulmonary, pericardiophrenic, innominate, internal mammary, celiac, splenic, or renal arteries.

=== Types ===
==== Intralobar sequestration ====
- The intralobar variety accounts for 75 percent of all sequestrations.
- Usually presents in adolescence or adulthood as recurrent pneumonias.
- The lung tissue lies within the same visceral pleura as the lobe in which it occurs.
- Males and females are equally affected.
- The arterial supply is usually derived from the lower thoracic or upper abdominal aorta.
- Venous drainage is usually to the left atrium via pulmonary veins establishing a left to left shunt.
- Abnormal connections to the vena cava, azygous vein, or right atrium may occur.
- Two thirds of the time, the sequestration is located in the paravertebral gutter in the posterior segment of the left lower lobe.
- Unlike extralobar sequestration, it is rarely associated with other developmental abnormalities.
- Patients present with signs and symptoms of pulmonary infection of a lower lobe mass.
- It is believed that sequestrations become infected when bacteria migrate through the Pores of Kohn or if the sequestration is incomplete.

==== Extralobar sequestration ====
- The extralobar variety accounts for 25 percent of all sequestrations.
- Onset usually in infancy with respiratory compromise.
- Develops as an accessory lung contained within its own pleura.
- Male to female predominance of 3:1 to 4:1.
- Related to the left hemidiaphragm in 90% of cases.
- May present as a subdiaphragmatic or retroperitoneal mass.
- In general, the arterial supply of comes from an aberrant vessel from thoracic aorta.
- It usually drains via the systemic venous system to the right atrium, vena cava, or azygous systems.
- Congenital anomalies occur more frequently in patients with extralobar sequestration than intralobar sequestration.
- Associated anomalies include congenital cystic adenomatoid malformation, congenital diaphragmatic hernia, vertebral anomalies, congenital heart disease, pulmonary hypoplasia, and colonic duplication
- Since it is enveloped in its own pleural sac, it rarely gets infected so almost always presents as a homogeneous soft tissue mass.
- The mass may be closely associated with the esophagus, and fistulae may develop.

=== Imaging ===
- An arteriogram has been considered vital in documenting the systemic blood supply, allowing definitive diagnosis as well as preoperative planning.
- The advent of new noninvasive imaging techniques has changed this thinking.

==== Chest radiograph ====
- Sequestrations typically appear as a uniformly dense mass within the thoracic cavity or pulmonary parenchyma.
- Recurrent infection can lead to the development of cystic areas within the mass.
- Air-fluid levels due to bronchial communication can be seen.

==== Ultrasound ====
- The typical sonographic appearance of BPS is an echogenic homogeneous mass that may be well defined or irregular.
- Some lesions have a cystic or more complex appearance.
- Doppler studies are helpful to identify the characteristic aberrant systemic artery that arises from the aorta and to delineate venous drainage.

==== CT ====
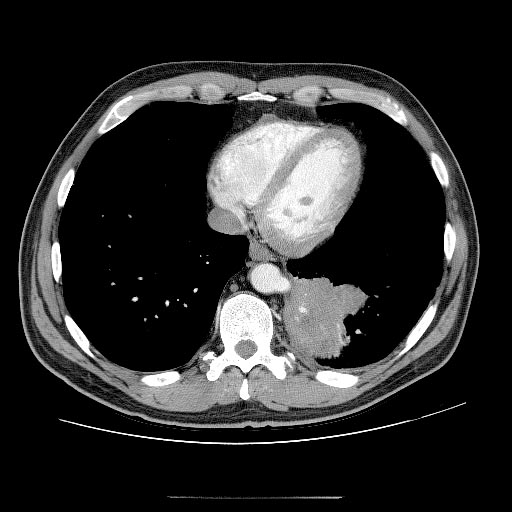
Chest CT showing pulmonary sequestration

- CT scans have 90% accuracy in the diagnosis of pulmonary sequestration.
- The most common appearance is a solid mass that may be homogeneous or heterogeneous, sometimes with cystic changes.
- Less frequent findings include a large cavitary lesion with an air-fluid level, a collection of many small cystic lesions containing air or fluid, or a well-defined cystic mass.
- Emphysematous changes at the margin of the lesion are characteristic and may not be visible on the chest radiograph.
- CT technique for optimal depiction of lesions by using state-of-the-art volumetric scanning requires a fast intravenous (IV) contrast injection rate and appropriate volume and delay based upon size.
- Multiplanar and 3D reconstructions are helpful.

==== MRI ====
- Contrast-enhanced MRA or even conventional T1-weighted spin-echo (SE) images may help in the diagnosis of pulmonary sequestration by demonstrating a systemic blood supply, particularly from the aorta, to a basal lung mass.
- In addition, MRA may demonstrate venous drainage of the mass and may obviate more invasive investigations.
- However, CT allows sharper delineation of thin-walled cysts and emphysematous changes than MRI.

== Treatment ==
Usually the sequestration is removed after birth via surgery. In most cases this surgery is safe and effective; the child will grow up to have normal lung function.

In a few instances, fetuses with sequestrations develop problematic fluid collections in the chest cavity. In these situations a Harrison catheter shunt can be used to drain the chest fluid into the amniotic fluid.

In rare instances where the fetus has a very large lesion, resuscitation after delivery can be dangerous. In these situations a specialized delivery for management of the airway compression can be planned called the EXIT procedure, or a fetal laser ablation procedure can be performed. During this minimally invasive fetal intervention, a small needle is inserted into the sequestration, and a laser fiber is targeted at the abnormal blood vessel going to the sequestration. The goal of the operation is to use laser energy to stop the blood flow to the sequestration, causing it to stop growing. Ideally, after the surgery, the sequestration steals less blood flow from the fetus, and the heart and lungs start growing more normally as the sequestration shrinks in size and the pleural effusion goes away.

The treatment for this is a wedge resection, segmentectomy, or lobectomy via a VATS procedure or thoracotomy.

Pulmonary sequestrations usually get their blood supply from the thoracic aorta. (intrapulmonary sequestration drains via pulmonary veins, extra pulmonary sequestration drains to the IVC)

== Sources ==
- Truitt AK; Carr SR; Cassese J; Kurkchubasche AG; Tracy TF Jr; Luks FI. (2006). "Perinatal management of congenital cystic lung lesions in the age of minimally invasive surgery". J Pediatr Surg. 41 (5): 41:893–896. doi:10.1016/j.jpedsurg.2006.01.004. PMID 16677877.
- Savic B; Birtel FJ; Tholen W; Funke HD; Knoche R. (1979). "Lung sequestration: report of seven cases and review of 540 published cases". Thorax. 34 (1): 34:96–101. doi:10.1136/thx.34.1.96. PMC 471015. PMID 442005.
- Fabre O; Porte H; Godart F; Rey C; Wurtz A. (1998). "Long-Term Cardiovascular Consequences of Undiagnosed Intralobar Pulmonary Sequestration". Annals of Thoracic Surgery. 65 (4): 65, 1144–6. doi:10.1016/S0003-4975(98)00032-0. PMID 9564949.
- Borrelli EP (2017). "Maybe it is More than Pneumonia: Case Report of an intralobar sequestration in a 20-year-old male". Respiratory Case Reports. 6 (2): 6, 96–98. doi:10.5505/respircase.2017.92499.
- Ferguson (1983). "Congenital lesion of the lungs and emphysema". Gibbons surgery of the Chest (4th ? ed.). WB Saunders. pp. 668–709. ISBN Unknown.
- Rubin E; Garcia H; Horowitz M; Guerra J. (1994). "Fatal Massive Hemoptysia Secondary to Intralobar Sequestration". Chest. 106 (3): 954–955. doi:10.1378/chest.106.3.954. PMID 8082388.
- Sabiston D, Spencer F. Surgery of the Chest (6th ed.). pp. 853–862.
