= EXIT procedure =

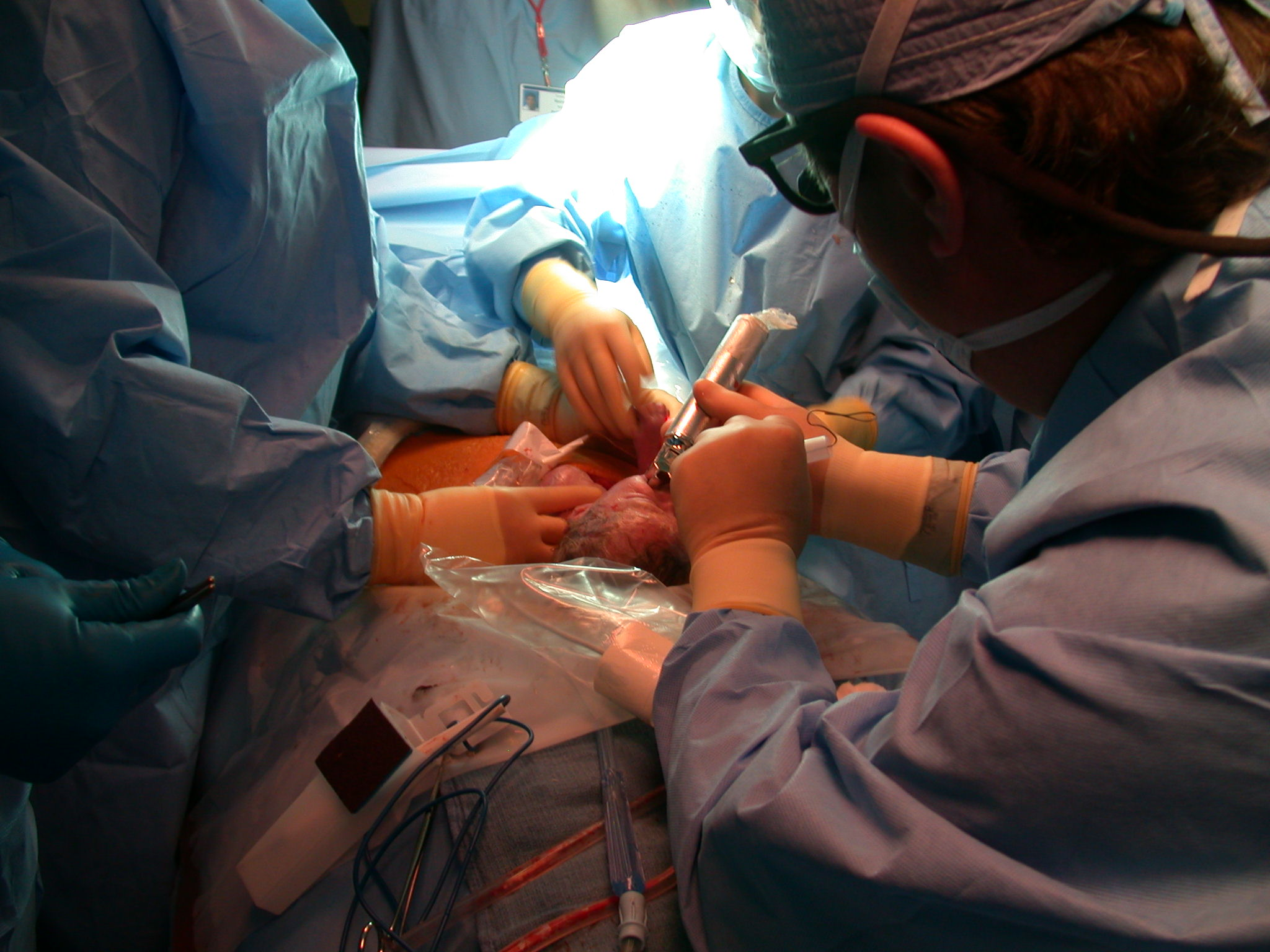
- EXIT procedure: With only the baby's head and shoulders delivered, a pediatric surgeon establishes access to the airway, while the baby continues to receive oxygen through the umbilical cord.
- Specialty: Obstetrics

The EXIT procedure, or ex utero intrapartum treatment procedure, is a specialized surgical delivery procedure used to deliver babies who have airway compression. Causes of airway compression in newborn babies result from a number of rare congenital disorders, including bronchopulmonary sequestration, congenital cystic adenomatoid malformation, mouth or neck tumor such as teratoma, and lung or pleural tumor such as pleuropulmonary blastoma. Airway compression discovered at birth is a medical emergency. In many cases, however, the airway compression is discovered during prenatal ultrasound exams, permitting time to plan a safe delivery using the EXIT procedure or other means.

== Process ==
The EXIT is an extension of a standard classical Caesarean section, where an opening is made on the midline of the anesthetized mother's abdomen and uterus. Then comes the EXIT: the baby is partially delivered through the opening but remains attached by its umbilical cord to the placenta, while a pediatric otolaryngologist-head & neck surgeon establishes an airway so the fetus can breathe. Once the EXIT is complete, the umbilical cord is clamped then cut and the infant is fully delivered. Then the remainder of the C-section proceeds.

The ex utero intrapartum treatment (EXIT) procedure was originally developed to reverse temporary tracheal occlusion in patients who had undergone fetal surgery for severe congenital diaphragmatic hernia (CDH). In a select group of fetuses with CDH, tracheal occlusion is used to obstruct the normal flow of fetal lung fluid and to stimulate lung expansion and growth. With the airway obstructed, airway management at birth is critical. The solution was to arrange delivery in such a way that the occlusion could be removed and the airway secured while the baby remained on placental support. If the uterus was kept relaxed and the utero-placental blood flow kept intact, the fetus could remain on a maternal 'heart-lung machine' while the airway was secured. While the technique of tracheal occlusion remains under study in clinical trials, EXIT procedures have been shown to be useful for management of other causes of fetal airway obstruction.

== Challenges ==
The EXIT is much more complex than a standard C-section, as it requires careful coordination between the mother's physicians and the specialists operating on the newborn baby. The difficulty lies in preserving enough blood flow through the umbilical cord, protecting the placenta, and avoiding contractions of the uterus so that there is sufficient time to establish the airway. Also, the umbilical cord should not be manipulated, but should be kept in warmed fluids to avoid physiological occlusion.

== See also ==
- Fetal intervention
