= Pneumonolysis =

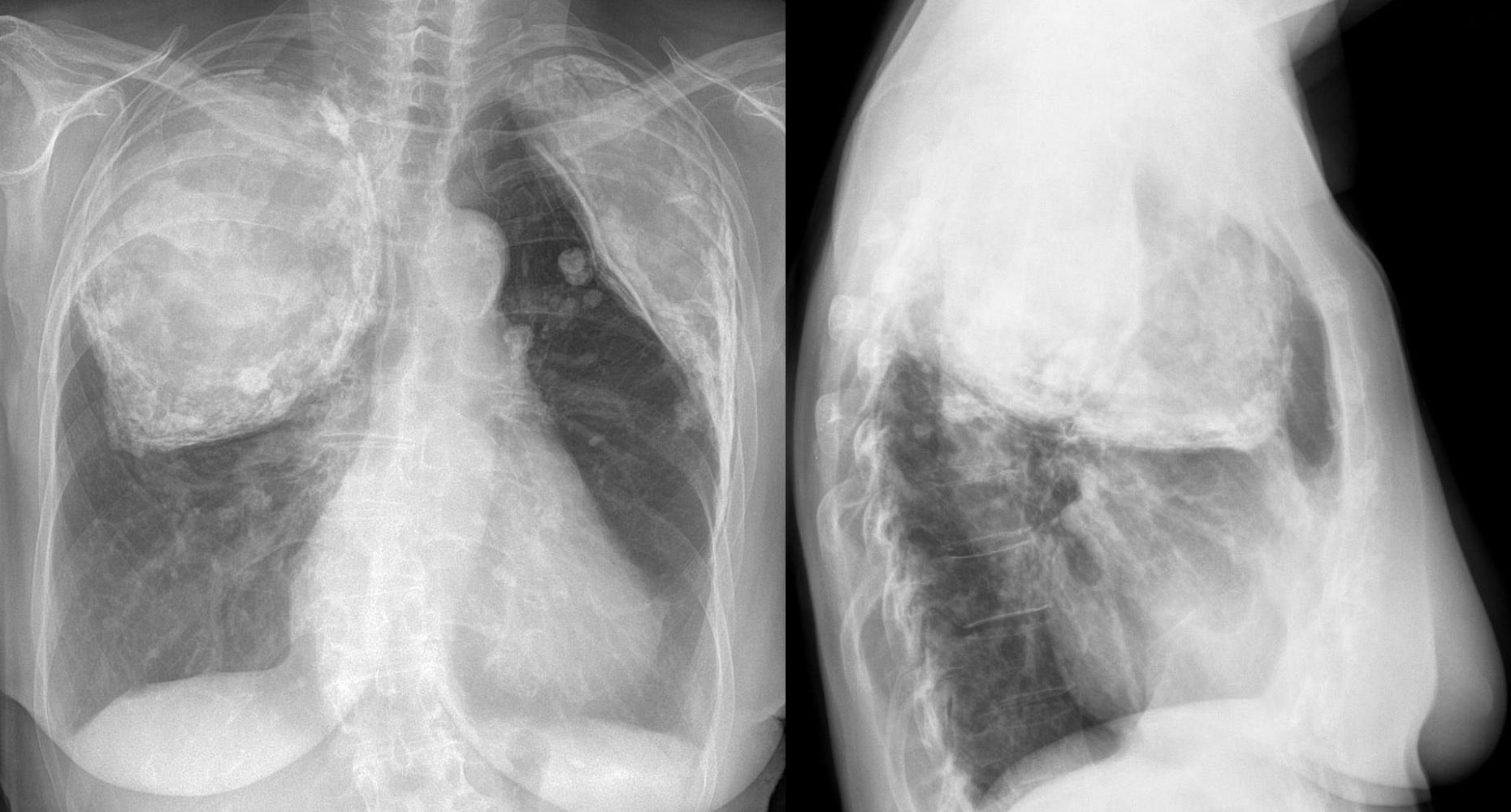
- X-ray in an elderly woman after pneumonolysis
- Specialty: Pulmonology
- MeSH: D011025

Pneumonolysis, sometimes referred to as plombage, is the separation of an adherent lung from the pleura, to permit collapse of the lung. It was formerly used to treat tuberculosis before effective medications were developed.

The underlying theory of the treatment was the belief that if the diseased lobe of the lung was physically forced to collapse, it would heal quickly. There were positive results in tuberculosis therapy following plombage in the decades of the 1930s, 1940s and early-1950s. However, with the introduction of drugs which were effective in destroying the tuberculosis bacterium (Mycobacterium tuberculosis), plombage treatment fell into disfavor. In addition, complications of plombage began to appear in patients who had been so treated. These complications included hemorrhage, infection and fistulization (abnormal opening between two hollow organs) of the bronchus, aorta, esophagus and skin.

The technique involved surgically creating a cavity underneath the ribs in the upper part of the chest wall and filling this space with some inert material. A variety of substances were typically used and included air, olive or mineral oil, gauze, paraffin wax, rubber sheeting or bags and Lucite balls. The inserted material would force the upper lobe of the lung to collapse.
