= Congenital diaphragmatic hernia =

- Other names: CDH
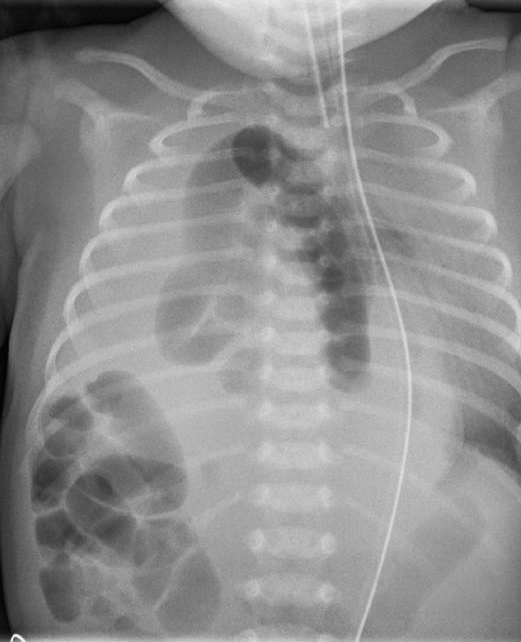
- Chest radiograph of a newborn with CDH, showing bowel loops in the chest.
- Specialty: Neonatology, pediatrics
- Symptoms: Respiratory distress at birth
- Usual onset: Congenital
- Types: Bochdalek hernia, Morgagni hernia
- Causes: Abnormal development of the diaphragm
- Diagnostic method: Prenatal ultrasound, chest radiography
- Treatment: Respiratory support, surgical repair
- Prognosis: Variable; depends on severity and associated anomalies
- Frequency: 2–3 per 10,000 births

Congenital diaphragmatic hernia (CDH) is a rare birth defect that occurs when incomplete formation of the diaphragm allows abdominal organs to protrude into the chest. This herniation of abdominal organs compresses developing lung tissue and impairs lung development, typically causing respiratory distress shortly after birth. Most defects occur in the posterolateral portion of the diaphragm and are known as Bochdalek hernias. The cause of the defect is generally unknown. The severity of CDH ranges from mild to life-threatening and is closely related to the degree of pulmonary hypoplasia and pulmonary hypertension. Treatment of CDH begins with cardiorespiratory stabilization, followed by surgical repair of the diaphragmatic defect. CDH occurs at a frequency of 2-3 cases per 10,000 births.

== Classification ==
Congenital diaphragmatic hernias can be classified by the location of the defect.

A Bochdalek hernia, also known as a posterolateral diaphragmatic hernia, is the most common form of CDH, accounting for more than 95% of cases. It is characterized by an opening in the posterolateral corner of the diaphragm which allows passage of the abdominal viscera into the chest cavity. The majority of Bochdalek hernias (80–85%) occur on the left side of the diaphragm; right-sided and bilateral defects are less common. The defect may range from a small opening to near-complete absence of one side of the diaphragm.A Morgagni hernia, also referred to as a retrosternal or parasternal hernia, is a rare anterior defect of the diaphragm. Accounting for approximately 2% of CDH cases, it is characterized by herniation through the foramina of Morgagni, which are located adjacent and posterior to the xiphoid process of the sternum. Morgagni hernias are less often associated with severe symptoms at birth and may be found later in life or incidentally.

Congenital diaphragmatic anomalies also include hiatal hernia and diaphragmatic eventration, though in these conditions the diaphragm remains intact.

== Presentation ==
Most infants with CDH develop respiratory distress soon after birth. They may also have poor oxygenation with bluish discoloration of the skin, known as cyanosis. Physical findings can include reduced breath sounds on the affected side, displacement of heart sounds away from the hernia, and a sunken or concave abdomen, known as a scaphoid abdomen. In a minority of cases (5-10%), CDH presents after the newborn period. An estimated 1% of cases are asymptomatic.

== Mechanism ==
Congenital diaphragmatic hernia is a form of diaphragmatic hernia that results from incomplete formation of the diaphragm during gestation. The diaphragm develops from multiple embryologic components that normally fuse to separate the thoracic and abdominal cavities. Failure of this fusion, most commonly involving the pleuroperitoneal membranes, leaves a persistent defect. Through this defect, abdominal organs such as the stomach, intestines, spleen, and sometimes the liver can enter the chest. The herniated organs occupy space needed for normal lung growth. As a result, the lungs remain underdeveloped, a condition known as pulmonary hypoplasia. This underdevelopment includes reduced branching of the airways, fewer alveoli, and diminished surface area for gas exchange. In affected lungs, the pulmonary vasculature is also abnormal, with fewer vessels and thickened arterial walls. These vascular changes contribute to pulmonary hypertension after birth.The underlying cause of congenital diaphragmatic hernia is unknown. The majority of cases occur sporadically, with no identifiable familial link.

== Diagnosis ==
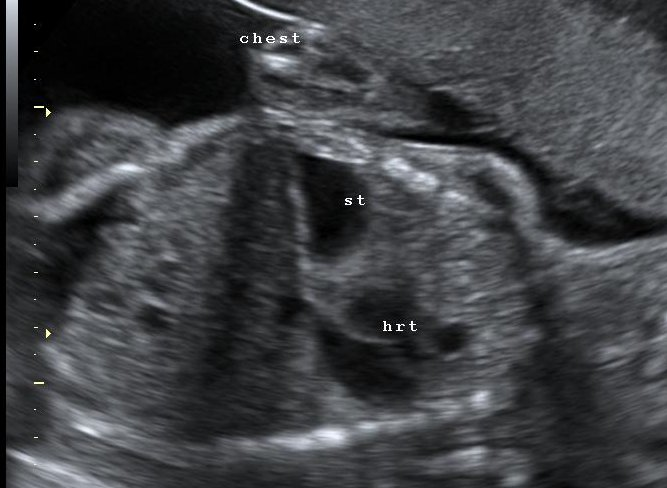
Prenatal ultrasound of congenital diaphragmatic hernia, showing the stomach ("st") within the chest beside the heart ("hrt"); the fetal head is at right and the abdomen at left.

CDH is most commonly identified on prenatal ultrasound, typically during the routine mid-pregnancy anatomical scan at 18-20 weeks' gestation. However, prenatal detection rates vary, and screening ultrasound fails to identify CDH in approximately one-third of cases. Prenatal assessment may include measurement of the observed-to-expected lung-to-head ratio, evaluation for liver herniation, and fetal echocardiography. These tests help assess the severity of pulmonary hypoplasia and identify associated abnormalities.After birth, diagnosis is usually confirmed by chest radiography, which may show bowel loops in the chest, the heart shifted toward the opposite side of the chest, and reduced gas in the abdomen. Genetic evaluation is often recommended because CDH may occur with chromosomal abnormalities or genetic disorders.

== Treatment ==
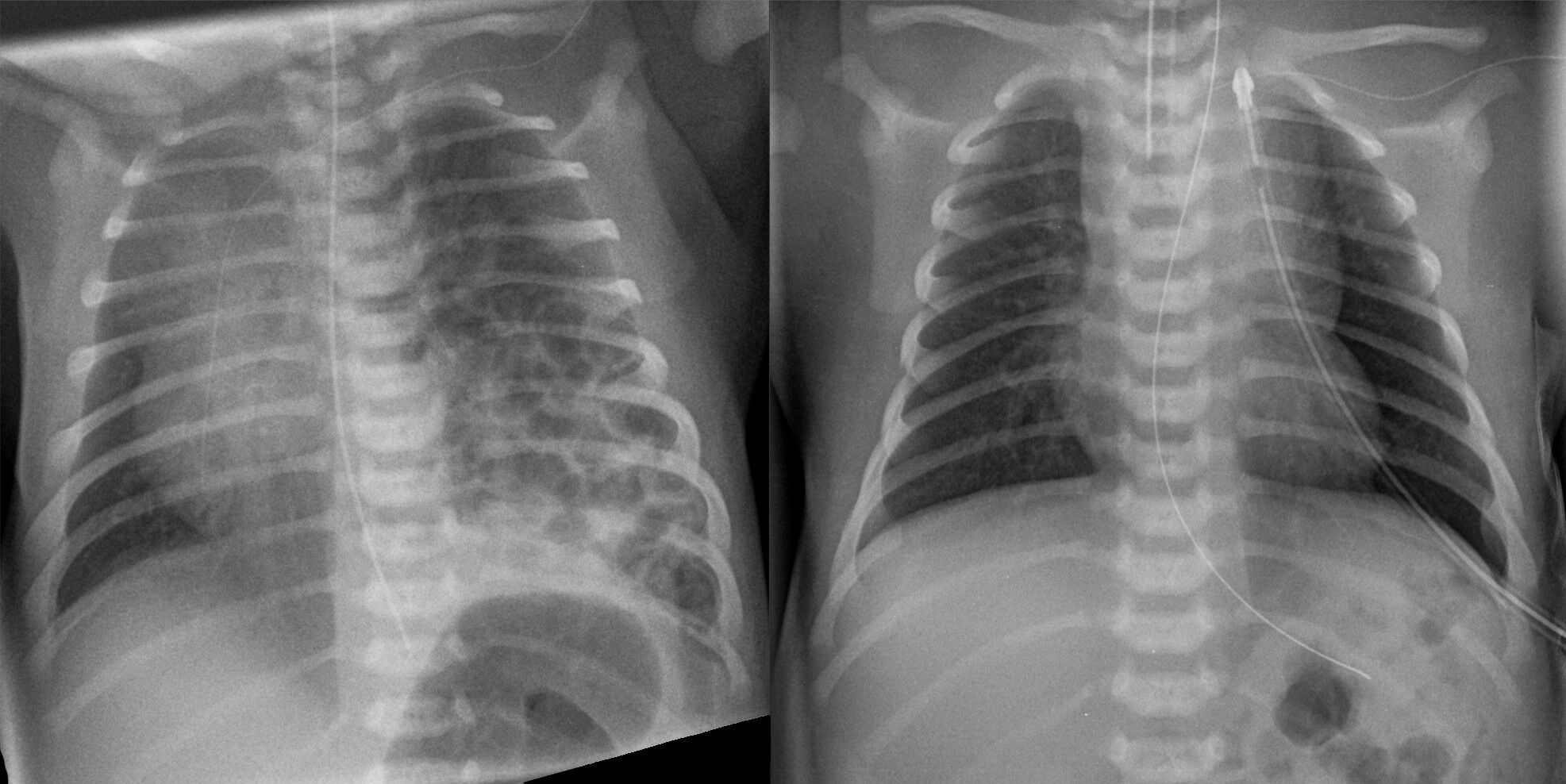
Left-sided congenital diaphragmatic hernia before (left) and after (right) surgical repair.

Treatment begins immediately after birth with insertion of a breathing tube into the trachea (endotracheal intubation) and placement of an orogastric tube through the mouth into the stomach. The breathing tube allows for mechanical ventilation, and the orogastric tube drains air and fluid from the stomach to reduce compression of the lungs and heart. In severe cases, extracorporeal membrane oxygenation (ECMO) may be used to temporarily support heart and lung function by circulating blood through a machine that adds oxygen and removes carbon dioxide before returning it to the body; the use of ECMO varies among centers.Surgical repair is usually performed after cardiopulmonary stabilization and is generally essential for survival. The operation involves moving the abdominal organs out of the chest and closing the diaphragmatic defect. Small defects may be closed with sutures, while larger defects or absent diaphragmatic tissue may require a patch or muscle flap. Open surgical repair is the standard approach, especially for large defects; minimally invasive repair is used in selected cases but has been associated with higher rates of recurrence.

== Prognosis ==
The prognosis of congenital diaphragmatic hernia depends largely on the severity of pulmonary hypoplasia and pulmonary hypertension. Specialized medical centers report survival rates of 70-90% for infants with isolated CDH. Survival is lower in studies that include all affected pregnancies, including stillbirths, pregnancy terminations, and newborns who die before receiving specialized care. In an international study across 19 countries, overall survival was approximately 62%, with most deaths occurring in the first week of life.Outcomes are generally worse when CDH is accompanied by heart defects or when it occurs as part of a chromosomal abnormality or genetic disorder. Poor prognosis is also associated with larger diaphragmatic defects, smaller lungs, right-sided hernias, and herniation of the liver into the chest.

=== Long-term outcomes ===
Among survivors of CDH, self-reported quality of life is generally normal and comparable to that of unaffected peers, although long-term medical complications are common. Respiratory complications include frequent respiratory infections and asthma-like symptoms, reported in 30-50% of children with CDH. Difficulty with feeding is common, sometimes requiring tube feeding, and can contribute to poor growth in early childhood; growth often improves with age, and feeding problems rarely persist into adulthood. Some survivors develop scoliosis or chest wall deformities. Children who survive CDH may have neurodevelopmental impairments, including problems with movement, learning, or hearing; these are more common after prolonged ventilation or ECMO. Recurrence of the hernia or bowel obstruction may require further surgery.

== Epidemiology ==
Globally, congenital diaphragmatic hernia occurs in approximately 2.4 of every 10,000 births. Most cases are Bochdalek hernias, with 85% occurring on the left side, 13% on the right side, and 2% bilaterally. Approximately half of cases are associated with additional congenital anomalies, most commonly cardiac anomalies.

== History ==
Diaphragmatic hernia was first described by French surgeon Ambroise Paré in 1575 based on two cases caused by trauma rather than congenital defects. The first reported case of congenital diaphragmatic hernia was described by Lazarus Riverius in 1679 as an incidental finding at postmortem examination. In 1848, Czech anatomist Vincenz Bochdalek described the posterolateral defect that now bears his name.The first successful surgical repair of CDH in an infant was performed in 1902 and reported in 1905. Surgical repair was not widely accepted until 1940, when surgeons William Ladd and Robert Gross reported 16 operated cases, 9 of whom survived. In 1946, Gross reported the first successful repair in a neonate less than 24 hours old. Despite increasingly early surgical intervention, overall survival did not improve. Pulmonary hypoplasia and pulmonary hypertension were later recognized as major causes of mortality, and management shifted toward stabilization before surgical repair.

== See also ==
- Diaphragmatic rupture
