= Wedge resection =

Surgical procedure

- ICD-9-CM: 32.20

Wedge resection is a surgical procedure to remove a triangle-shaped slice of tissue. It may be used to remove a tumor or some other type of tissue that requires removal and typically includes a small amount of normal tissue around it. It is easy to repair, does not greatly distort the shape of the underlying organ and leaves just a single stitch line as a residual.
