= Mert Ozan Bahtiyar =

Turkish-American physician

- Born: Turkey
- Education: Istanbul University (MD)
- Years active: 2005–present
- Known for: First in-utero spina bifida surgery in Connecticut; NAFTNet consensus guidelines
- Awards: Honorary M.A., Yale University (2020); NIH Young Investigator Award (2007); March of Dimes Prematurity Research Award (2006)
- Medical career
- Profession: Physician, Surgeon
- Institutions: Yale School of Medicine
- Sub-specialties: Maternal-fetal medicine, Fetal surgery
- Research: Fetal therapy, Ultrasound, Fetal echocardiography, Twin pregnancies

Mert Ozan Bahtiyar is a Turkish-American physician and maternal-fetal medicine specialist who serves as Professor of Obstetrics, Gynecology & Reproductive Sciences at Yale School of Medicine and Director of the Yale Fetal Care Center. He is known for leading the team that performed Connecticut's first in-utero surgery to repair spina bifida in March 2020, for performing the first fetoscopic laser photocoagulation for twin-to-twin transfusion syndrome in Connecticut, and for his leadership role in developing national clinical guidelines for the management of monochorionic twin pregnancies.

== Education ==
Bahtiyar received his M.D. from Istanbul University Cerrahpaşa Faculty of Medicine in 1994. He completed his residency in obstetrics and gynecology at Yale-New Haven Hospital in 2002, followed by a fellowship in maternal-fetal medicine at Yale in 2005. In 2020, he was awarded an honorary Master of Arts degree from Yale College in recognition of his contributions to medicine and medical education.

== Career ==
After completing his fellowship, Bahtiyar joined the Yale faculty in 2005. He currently holds the positions of Professor of Obstetrics, Gynecology & Reproductive Sciences at Yale School of Medicine and serves as Director of the Yale Fetal Care Center and Section Chief of Maternal-Fetal Medicine. He is also a Fellow of Benjamin Franklin College at Yale University. His primary research interests include fetal echocardiography, ultrasound, invasive fetal therapy, and the management of complex twin pregnancies.

== Research and clinical contributions ==
=== Fetal surgery ===
On March 21, 2020, Bahtiyar co-led a team of more than 20 specialists that performed Connecticut's first open in-utero surgery to repair myelomeningocele, the most severe form of spina bifida. The four-hour procedure was performed during the early stages of the COVID-19 pandemic.

In 2013, Bahtiyar performed Connecticut's first fetoscopic laser photocoagulation procedure for twin-to-twin transfusion syndrome at Yale-New Haven Hospital. The Yale Fetal Care Center has since become a regional referral center for this specialized procedure.

=== Fetal echocardiography ===
Bahtiyar's research encompasses fetal echocardiography, the use of ultrasound to evaluate the developing fetal cardiovascular system. In 2010, he received a research grant from the American Institute of Ultrasound in Medicine (AIUM) to investigate the role of intra-uterine inflammation in altering fetal cardiac function. His work in prenatal cardiac imaging has contributed to improved detection of congenital heart defects before birth, enabling earlier intervention and delivery planning.

=== Guidelines development ===
Bahtiyar served as lead author on the North American Fetal Therapy Network (NAFTNet) consensus statement on prenatal surveillance of uncomplicated monochorionic gestations, published in Obstetrics & Gynecology in 2015. This guideline, developed by a consortium of 30 medical institutions in the United States and Canada, established evidence-based recommendations for monitoring twin pregnancies that share a single placenta. He also co-authored subsequent NAFTNet consensus statements on the management of complicated monochorionic gestations and prenatal management guidelines.

=== Stillbirth research ===
Bahtiyar's research on the relationship between advanced maternal age and stillbirth risk has been widely cited and influenced clinical practice guidelines. His 2008 study published in the American Journal of Perinatology demonstrated that women aged 40 and older have a significantly increased risk of stillbirth at term, and recommended initiating antenatal testing at 38 weeks for this population. This research received international media coverage and is cited in the American College of Obstetricians and Gynecologists (ACOG) clinical guidelines on pregnancy at age 35 and older.

=== Publications ===
Bahtiyar has authored or co-authored more than 125 peer-reviewed publications. His research has appeared in journals including Obstetrics & Gynecology, American Journal of Obstetrics and Gynecology, Ultrasound in Obstetrics and Gynecology, and Fetal Diagnosis and Therapy. He has also contributed chapters to major medical textbooks including Creasy and Resnik's Maternal-Fetal Medicine and Protocols for High-Risk Pregnancies.

== Awards and honors ==
- Honorary Master of Arts, Yale College (2020)
- National Institutes of Health Perinatal Research Society Young Investigator Award (2007)
- March of Dimes Prematurity Research Award (2006)
- American Institute of Ultrasound in Medicine (AIUM) Endowment for Education and Research Grant (2010)
- Association of Professors of Gynecology and Obstetrics (APGO) National Faculty Award for Excellence in Teaching (2011)
- Council on Resident Education in Obstetrics and Gynecology (CREOG) National Faculty Award for Excellence in Resident Education (2008)
- Guest Editor, Year Book of Neonatal and Perinatal Medicine (2007–2008)

== Professional memberships ==
- Fellow, American College of Obstetricians and Gynecologists (FACOG)
- Member, Society for Maternal-Fetal Medicine
- Member, American Institute of Ultrasound in Medicine
- Member, International Society of Ultrasound in Obstetrics and Gynecology
- Member, North American Fetal Therapy Network
