= Kypros Nicolaides =

Greek-Cypriot fetal medicine specialist

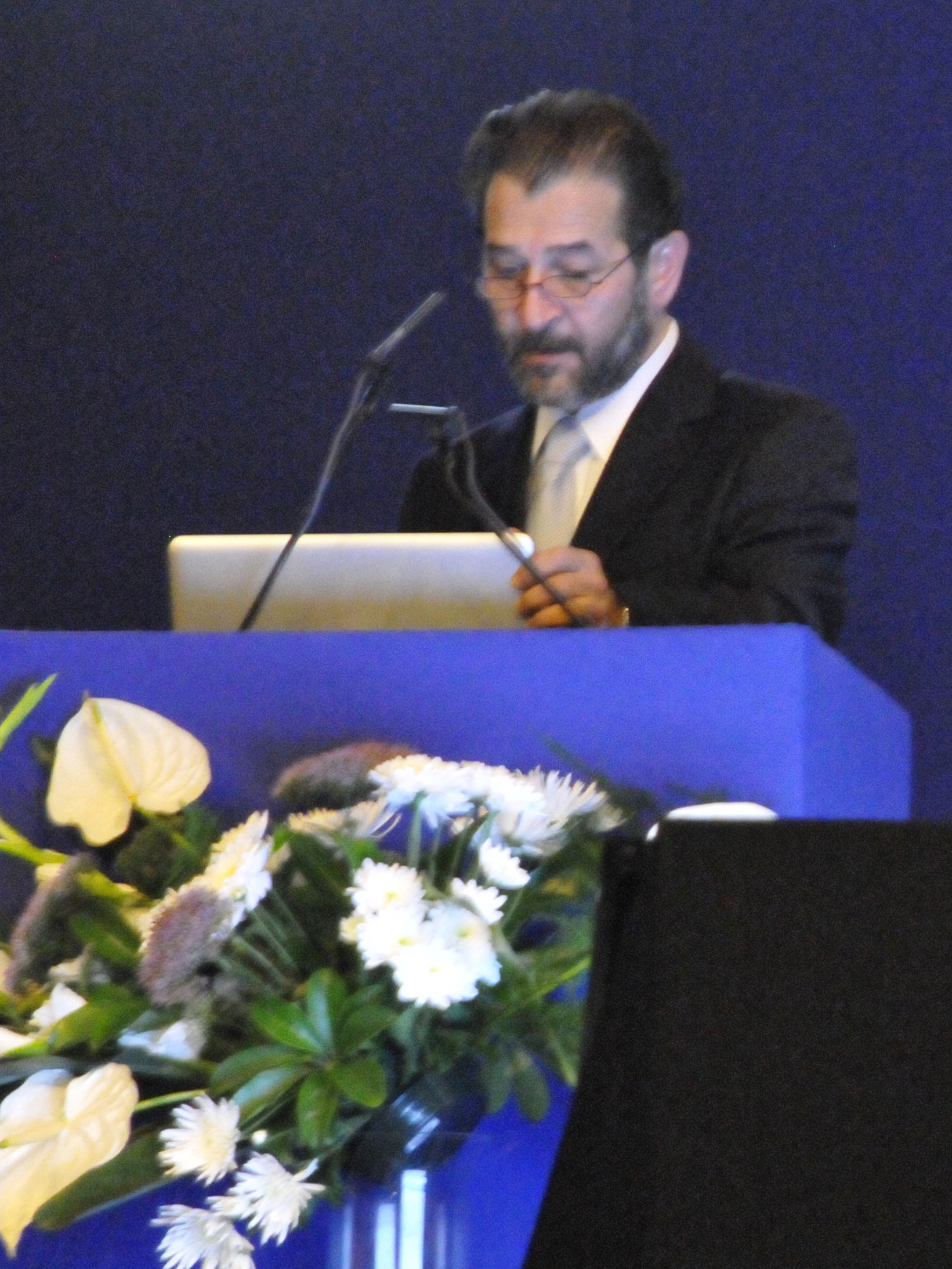
- Nicolaides in 2011
- Born: 9 April 1953 (age 73); Paphos, Cyprus
- Education: King's College London

Kyprianos "Kypros" Nicolaides FRCOG (born 9 April 1953) is a Cypriot physician, Professor of Fetal Medicine at King's College Hospital, London. He is one of the pioneers of fetal medicine and his discoveries have revolutionised the field.

He was elected to the US National Academy of Medicine in 2020 for 'improving the care of pregnant women worldwide with pioneering rigorous and creative approaches, and making seminal contributions to prenatal diagnosis and every major obstetrical disorder'. This is considered to be one of the highest honours in the fields of health and medicine and recognises individuals who have demonstrated outstanding professional achievement and commitment to service.

== Early life and education ==
Nicolaides was born in 1953 in Paphos, Cyprus, and attended The English School in Nicosia. He studied Biochemistry and Physiology at King's College London and Medicine at King's College School of Medicine and Dentistry in London, graduating in 1978. Soon after graduation, in 1980, he joined the Department of Obstetrics and Gynaecology, doing research with Professor Stuart Campbell and Professor Charles Rodeck as his first assistant, working mainly on fetoscopic techniques and procedures. His manual dexterity at procedures and the Rodeck-Nicolaides team soon produced important papers on the use of fetoscopy in the management of a wide range of conditions such as Rhesus iso-immunization, fetal hydrops and intrauterine growth restriction, and procedures such as blood and tissue sampling in the diagnosis of single gene defects.

== Professional career ==
In 1986 Nicolaides became Director of the Harris Birthright Research Centre for Fetal Medicine, the first Fetal Medicine Unit in the United Kingdom, opened in 1984 by Diana, Princess of Wales. His programme of research and teaching made King's College Hospital the largest and most renowned centre for fetal medicine in the world.

He has held the position of Professor of Fetal Medicine at King's College London since 1992. He has been a member of several study groups of the Royal College of Obstetricians and Gynaecologists, the Chairman of the Educational Committee of the World Association of Perinatal Medicine and the Chairman of the Scientific Committee of the International Society of Ultrasound in Obstetrics and Gynecology.

He is also the Founder and Chairman of the UK Charity, the Fetal Medicine Foundation, which he set up in 1995. The main source of income of the Charity is a private clinic, and the Fetal Medicine Foundation has donated more than £45 million to finance the training of doctors from around the world and to carry out major multi-centre research studies in fetal medicine. The Fetal Medicine Foundation also organises the yearly World Congress in Fetal Medicine, which is attended by more than 2,000 participants and has implemented a series of internet-based educational courses for doctors and patients which are available free of charge.

Nicolaides has authored over 1,500 peer-reviewed journal articles and more than 30 books and monographs. He has an H-index of 185, which is the highest of any obstetrician & gynaecologist in the world, and has had his research cited over 130,000 times. He has supervised 55 doctors in obtaining PhD and MD qualifications and has provided training in Fetal Medicine to over 700 doctors from 50 countries.

Nicolaides has developed methods of (i) screening for premature birth (which is the main cause of perinatal morbidity and mortality) by measurement of cervical length and prevention through the use of vaginal progesterone, (ii) screening for pre-eclampsia (which is one of the main causes of maternal mortality) by measurement of blood flow to the uterus by Doppler and measurement of blood pressure and the hormone placental growth factor and prevention through the use of aspirin, (iii) methods of early screening for chromosomal abnormalities through the measurement of nuchal translucency, and spina bifida through the ‘lemon and banana’ signs, and (iv) methods of fetal therapy including fetal blood transfusions for red cell isoimmunized pregnancies, thoraco-amniotic shunting for fetal pleural effusions, endoscopic laser surgery for identical twin pregnancies with severe twin-to-twin transfusion syndrome in collaboration with Professor Yves Ville and endoscopic placement of a balloon in the fetal trachea for the treatment of severe diaphragmatic hernia in collaboration with Professors Jan Deprest and Eduard Gratacos. He has recently proposed a new model of pregnancy care - "Turning the Pyramid of Prenatal Care". This aims to assess the risk for most of the relevant pregnancy complications affecting mother and unborn child during a hospital visit at 11–13 weeks of gestation and, on the basis of such risks, provide personalised care to reduce an adverse outcome.

== Professional misconduct ==
In 1998 Nicolaides was accused of serious misconduct by Jennifer Sabin. She claimed that he had joked about her underwear and Newcastle origins, while conducting laser surgery for her twins suffering from twin-to-twin transfusion syndrome. He was cleared of the charges by the General Medical Council and found not guilty of misconduct, though the council found some of his remarks to be inappropriate.

During the hearing, he was questioned over whether he had ever received allegations of sexual harassment or misconduct. He denied being accused, but it was later discovered that three months earlier, his personal assistant and colleague at King's College Hospital, Shelley Ormerod, had filed formal sexual harassment accusations against him. Though the allegations were unsubstantiated with no action taken, the General Medical Council found him guilty of lying under oath by deliberately misleading the 1998 hearing. Nicolaides denied having intentionally misled the committee, and claimed to have thought that the inquiry referred only to his relations with his patients.

He filed a High Court claim to have the serious professional misconduct finding overturned, but it was dismissed.

== Awards and recognitions ==
- Ian Donald Gold Medal for Highest Contribution in Ultrasound, International Society of Ultrasound in Obstetrics and Gynecology, 1999
- Erich Saling Award for Highest Scientific Contribution in Perinatal Medicine, World Association of Perinatal Medicine, 2001
- Excellence in Letters, Culture and Science, Government of Cyprus, 2004
- Honorary Fellowship of The American Institute of Ultrasound in Medicine, USA, 2004
- Membership of the International Academy of Perinatal Medicine, Barcelona, Spain, 2005
- Honorary Doctorate in Medicine, University of Athens, Greece, 2005
- Honorary Doctorate in Medicine, Medical University of Warsaw, Poland, 2009
- Honorary Doctorate in Medicine, University of Bucharest, Romania, 2009
- Honorary Doctorate in Medicine, University of Jinan, China, 2010
- Spinoza Chair, University of Amsterdam, the Netherlands, 2010
- Honorary Doctorate in Medicine, Palacky University of Olomouc, Czech Republic, 2011
- Honorary Professorship in Medicine, University of Ioannina, Greece, 2012
- Honorary Doctorate in Medicine, European University of Cyprus, Cyprus, 2013
- European Maternity Prize for distinction in professional career and dedication to the field of Perinatal Medicine, European Association of Perinatal Medicine, 2014
- Eardley Holland Gold Medal for outstanding contribution to the science, practice and teaching of Obstetrics & Gynaecology, Royal College of Obstetricians and Gynaecologists, 2015
- Honorary Doctorate in Medicine, University of Thessaly, Greece, 2016
- Honorary Doctorate in Medicine, Aristotelion University of Thessaloniki, Greece, 2017
- Honorary Doctorate in Medicine, Medical University of Pleven, Bulgaria, 2017
- Honorary Doctorate in Medicine, University of Cyprus, Cyprus, 2017
- Naguib Pasha Mahfouz Award, Cairo University, Egypt, 2018
- Honorary Doctorate in Medicine, University of Leuven, Belgium, 2019
- Honorary Doctorate in Medicine, University of Buenos Aires, Argentina, 2019
- Honorary Fellowship of The Hong Kong College of Obstetricians and Gynaecologists, Hong Kong, 2020
- Member of the National Academy of Medicine, US, 2020
- Golden Cross of the Order of the Phoenix of the Hellenic Republic, Greece, 2022
- Fellow of the Academy of Medical Sciences, 2026

== Television ==
The BBC television programme Life Before Birth is mainly about his work.

Nicolaides also stars in the first episode of Netflix's docuseries The Surgeon's Cut, which was released in December 2020. This episode follows Nicolaides at King's College Hospital in London where his ground-breaking work in endoscopic laser surgery is used to treat twin-to-twin transfusion syndrome, a life-threatening prenatal condition.
