= Beryl Benacerraf =

American radiologist (1949–2022)

- Born: April 29, 1949; New York City, U.S.
- Died: October 1, 2022 (aged 73); Cambridge, Massachusetts, U.S.
- Education: Columbia University College of Physicians and Surgeons, Harvard Medical School
- Scientific career
- Fields: Medicine
- Workplaces: Harvard Medical School; Brigham and Women's Hospital

Beryl Rice Benacerraf (April 29, 1949 – October 1, 2022) was an American radiologist and professor of obstetrics, gynecology and reproductive biology and radiology at Harvard Medical School. She was a pioneer in the use of prenatal ultrasound to diagnose fetal abnormalities, including Down syndrome. In 2021, she was recognized as a "Giant in Obstetrics and Gynecology" by the American Journal of Obstetrics & Gynecology.

== Early years ==
Benacerraf was born in 1949 in New York City. She was the daughter of Baruj Benacerraf, who shared the 1980 Nobel Prize in Physiology or Medicine. She spent her early years in France and returned to New York City at age seven, attending the Brearley School and Barnard College in Manhattan. Although undiagnosed dyslexia had impaired her academic performance as an undergraduate, Benacerraf stated it was less of a handicap in medical school, where the textbooks included "a lot of graphs and images and charts". She began her medical studies at Columbia University College of Physicians and Surgeons, and then transferred to Harvard Medical School, where she completed her medical degree in 1976.

== Research and medical career ==
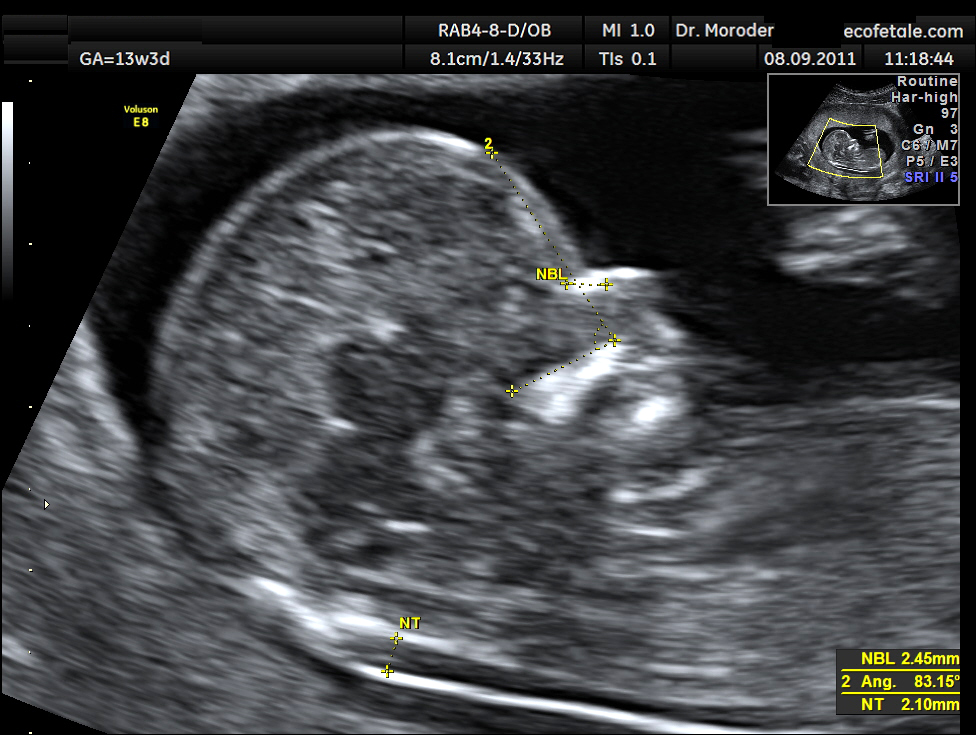
Nuchal translucency scan (NT) in first trimester fetus

Benacerraf did her residency in radiology at Massachusetts General Hospital. She then accepted a fellowship at Brigham and Women's Hospital where she specialized in ultrasound. She established a practice in 1982 specializing in prenatal ultrasound.

Benacerraf pioneered the field of "genetic sonography" with her discovery that nuchal fold thickness–the distance between the occipital bone and the surface of the overlying skin at back of the neck–was a reliable metric for second-trimester diagnosis of Down syndrome. Benacerraf's advocacy of ultrasound as a less intrusive alternative to amniocentesis was initially criticized. She recalled, "People thought I was this crazy lady in private practice who thought that measuring the neck was related to Down syndrome. So I was almost booed off the stage a couple of times." However, a flurry of independent studies in the late '80s and '90s affirmed the diagnostic value of fetal ultrasound, and the nuchal translucency scan (pictured), the first-trimester analog of the nuchal fold thickness test, is now a standard component of prenatal aneuploidy screening. Benacerraf also made major contributions to prenatal hearing testing and fetal echocardiography.

Benacerraf credited her talent in reading ultrasound as the "flip side" of her dyslexia. In an interview with the Yale Center for Dyslexia & Creativity, she said:

During residency, I recognized that I had dyslexia. And then I realized I had this gift for imaging. Radiology is where I belonged. I live in a world of patterns and images and I see things that no one else sees. Anomalies jump out at me like a neon sign.

Benacerraf wrote over 300 scholarly papers, accruing over 13,000 citations. From 2015 to 2017 she served as president of the American Institute of Ultrasound in Medicine and was the editor-in-chief of its flagship Journal of Ultrasound in Medicine from 2000 to 2010. She was also the author of the textbooks Ultrasound of Fetal Syndromes and Gynecologic Ultrasound: A Problem-Based Approach. In 2021, she was recognized as a "Giant in Obstetrics and Gynecology" by the American Journal of Obstetrics & Gynecology (AJOG) for "[revolutionizing] the prenatal diagnosis of congenital anomalies".

== Personal life ==
Benacerraf was married in 1975 to Peter Libby, who became chief of cardiology at Brigham and Women's and Mallinckrodt Professor of Medicine at Harvard Medical School. They had a son and a daughter.

Benacerraf died of cancer on October 1, 2022, at home in Cambridge, Massachusetts. She was 73.

== Awards and honors ==
- Fellow, American College of Radiology
- Fellow, American Institute of Ultrasound in Medicine
- 2001, Ian Donald Gold Medal, International Society of Ultrasound in Obstetrics and Gynecology
- 2007, Roslyn Silver '27 Science Lecture, Barnard College
- 2008, Marie Curie Award, American Association for Women Radiologists
- 2010, Lawrence A. Mack Award for Lifetime Achievement, Society of Radiologists in Ultrasound
- 2023, Memorial Hall of Fame, American Institute of Ultrasound in Medicine

== Selected publications ==
- Hirnholz, Jason C.; Benacerraf, Beryl R. (1983). "The development of human fetal hearing". Science. 222 (4623): 516–518. Bibcode:1983Sci...222..516B. doi:10.1126/science.6623091. ISSN 0036-8075. PMID 6623091.
- Benacerraf, Beryl R.; Gelman, Rebecca; Frigoletto, Fredric D. (1987). "Sonographic Identification of Second-Trimester Fetuses with Down's Syndrome". New England Journal of Medicine. 317 (22): 1371–1376. doi:10.1056/NEJM198711263172203. ISSN 0028-4793. PMID 2960895.
- Benacerraf, Beryl R.; Mandell, James; Estroff, Judith A.; Harlow, Bernard L.; Frigoletto, Fredric D. (1990). "Fetal pyelectasis: A possible association with Down syndrome". Obstetrics and Gynecology. 76 (1): 58–60. ISSN 0029-7844. PMID 2141674.
- Bromley, Bryann; Lieberman, Ellice; Shipp, Thomas D.; Benacerraf, Beryl R. (2002). "The genetic sonogram: A method of risk assessment for Down syndrome in the second trimester". Journal of Ultrasound in Medicine. 21 (10): 1087–1096. doi:10.7863/jum.2002.21.10.1087. ISSN 0278-4297. PMID 12369663. S2CID 38564730.
