= Stuart Campbell (obstetrician) =

British obstetrician and gynaecologist (born 1936)

Professor Stuart Campbell FRCPE FRCOG FACOG

Professor of Obstetrics and Gynaecology, St George's Hospital Medical School

Professor of Obstetrics and Gynaecology, King's College Hospital

Personal details
- Born: 1936 (age 89–90) Glasgow, Scotland

Dr Stuart Campbell (born 1936) is a retired professor and obstetrician known for his contributions to the medical use of ultrasound for pregnant women.

== Early life and education ==
Campbell was born in Glasgow, Scotland, and graduated from the University of Glasgow Medical School in 1961. During his training, he worked with Ian Donald, who had published some of the first papers on the use of ultrasound in obstetrics. Together, they published multiple papers on fetal biometry and developed charts of fetal measurements, such as the bi-parietal diameter and head circumference. Their collaboration led to methods for estimating fetal weight using ultrasound.

== Career ==
After graduating from the University of Glasgow, Campbell went on to work at Queen Charlotte's Hospital in London before being appointed Professor of Obstetrics and Gynecology at King's College Hospital. There, he established the fetal medicine unit (now Harris-Birthright Research Centre for Fetal Medicine), where fetal medicine practitioners such as Kypros Nicolaides and Charles Rodeck would later train and work alongside Campbell.

Campbell's work included describing the use of ultrasound to diagnose fetal anomalies and later the use of Doppler ultrasound, in particular uteroplacental Doppler, in the assessment of 'high-risk' pregnancies.

Campbell became a Professor of Obstetrics & Gynaecology at St George's Hospital Medical School before his retirement. He was the founding President of the International Society of Ultrasound in Obstetrics & Gynecology (ISUOG) and the first editor of the journal Ultrasound in Obstetrics & Gynecology (The White Journal), a peer-reviewed journal that focuses on ultrasonography in obstetric and gynecological practice.

In 1992, he was awarded the Ian Donald Gold Medal of ISUOG in recognition of his contributions to ultrasound in obstetrics and gynecology, having authored over 400 peer-reviewed publications.

Since 2001, Campbell has served as a consultant at CREATE Fertility, a clinic that provides advanced techniques in reproductive medicine, antenatal care, and gynecological screening.

He also developed a method combining 2D and 3D ultrasound techniques, resulting in published papers on diagnosing cleft palate. In this work, he collaborated with Christoph Lees (Director of Fetal Medicine) and Per Hall (orofacial surgeon), two colleagues at Addenbrookes Hospital. The technique, called the reverse face view, provides information on congenital defects of the fetal palate; previously, only defects of the lips and alveolus could be visualized by existing techniques.

He described patterns of fetal behavior, such as blinking, smiling, crying, and reflexes in early pregnancy. Many of his images and moving 3D sequences of fetal behavior have been used in television documentaries such as "My Fetus", "Life Before Birth," and "In the Womb".

Campbell has continued to work as supervisor of the ultrasound arm of the UK Collaborative Trial of Ovarian Cancer Screening (UKCTOCS) trial.

== Positions held ==
- President, Ultrasound in Obstetrics and Gynecology (ISUOG) (1990-1998)
- Honorary Fellow, American Institute of Ultrasound in Medicine
- Honorary Fellow of the American College of Obstetricians and Gynaecologists
- Honorary Life Member, British Medical Ultrasound Society
- Academic Head of the Department of Obstetrics and Gynaecology at King's College Hospital (1976-1996)
- Academic Head of the Department of Obstetrics and Gynaecology at St George's Hospital Medical School, London (1996-2001)
- Founding Editor-in-Chief of the Scientific Medical Journal Ultrasound in Obstetrics and Gynecology (1991)

== See also ==
- Geeta Nargund
