= North American Fetal Therapy Network =

A magnetic resonance image of a fetus in utero

The North American Fetal Therapy Network (NAFTNet) is a voluntary association of medical centers in the United States and Canada with established expertise in fetal surgery and other forms of multidisciplinary care for complex disorders of the fetus.

The goal of NAFTNet is to foster collaborative research in fetal medicine. Members of NAFTNet can access current research protocols and participate in research studies. The NAFTNet initiative is funded, in part, by the National Institutes of Health (NIH).

NAFTNet also functions as an educational resource for patients and future parents. Its web site offer links to governmental agencies, medical sites, patient support groups and other resources in the field of fetal medicine and fetal intervention.

== History ==
In 2004, physicians from several centers that perform fetal surgery and advanced fetal therapy organized a workshop under the auspices of the National Institute for Child Health and Development to examine the future of fetal medicine.

One of the group's recommendations was that an organization that would regroup the most active centers throughout North America could help promote evidence-based fetal medicine and could help individual centers conduct sound and effective clinical research in the new field of fetal medicine.

The following year, physicians from four of the centers that participated in the workshop laid the groundwork for a North American Fetal Therapy Network, the steering Ccmmittee of which is now composed of representatives from 18 fetal treatment centers. NAFTNet members are physicians from various specialties involved in fetal medicine, including maternal-fetal medicine, pediatric surgery, genetics, neonatology and fetal cardiology.

== Fetal therapy ==
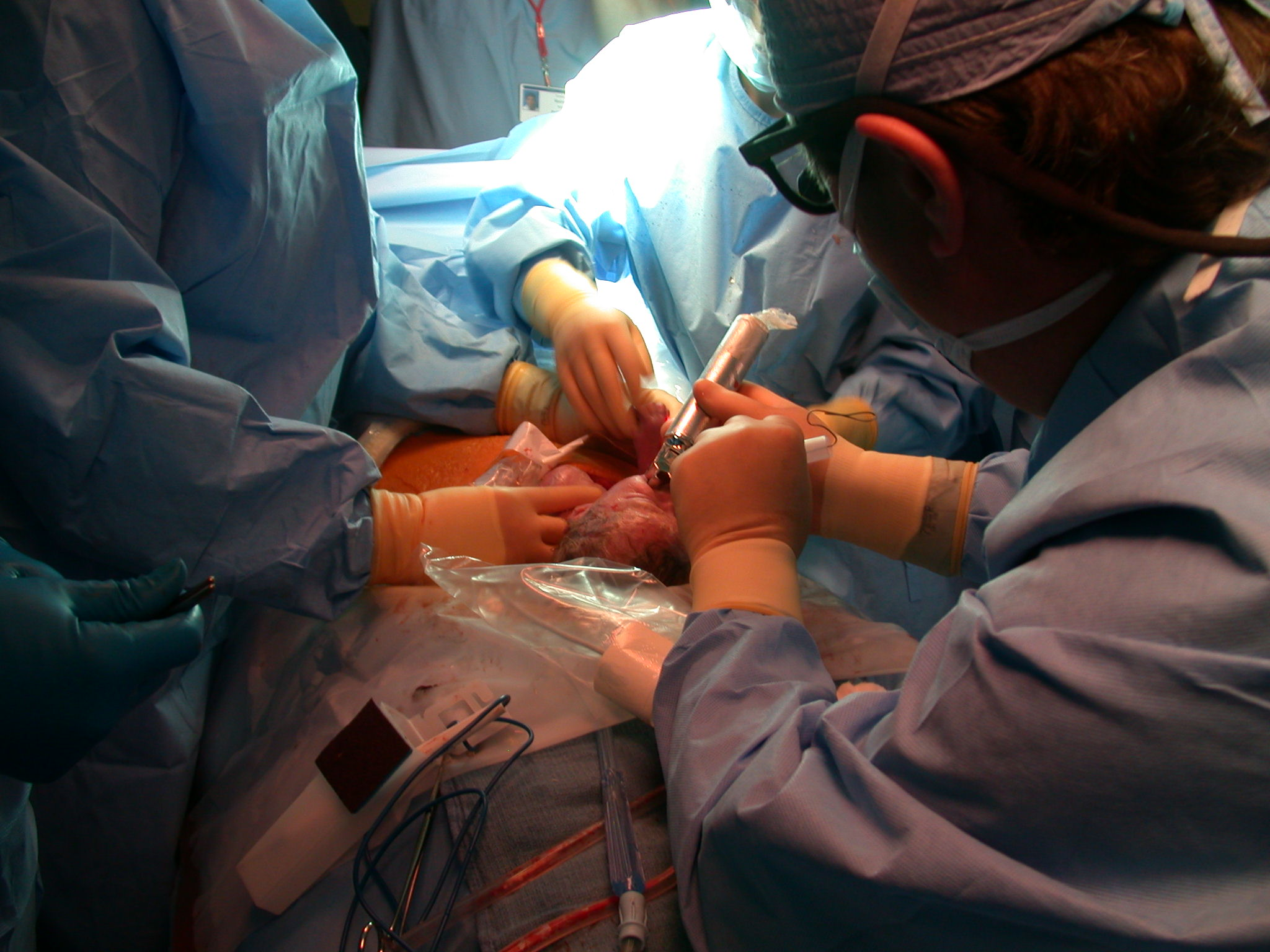
EXIT procedure

Fetal therapy, or fetal treatment, is part of fetal medicine. It includes interventions performed on a “sick” fetus with the aim of achieving fetal well being. These interventions include medical (i.e. non-invasive) and surgical procedures. In general a medical intervention is performed by administering medication to the mother. The drug crosses through the placenta and reaches the blood circulation of the fetus. Surgical intervention on the fetus may involve either a direct operation of the fetus or an intervention on the placenta, as in the case of twin-twin-transfusion syndrome (TTTS). In some cases, it may be performed at the time of delivery: the Ex Utero-Intrapartum (“EXIT procedure”) procedure.

Fetal therapy, and advanced fetal therapy in particular, is a relatively new field in medicine. Because of the complexity and the significant risks involved with a surgical or medical intervention on a pregnant woman and her fetus, these procedures are usually performed in specialized centers and involve a multidisciplinary team of specialists.

== See also ==
- Fetoscopy
