= Liona Poon =

Professor, Obstetrician-Gynaecologist, Researcher

Liona Poon 潘昭頤
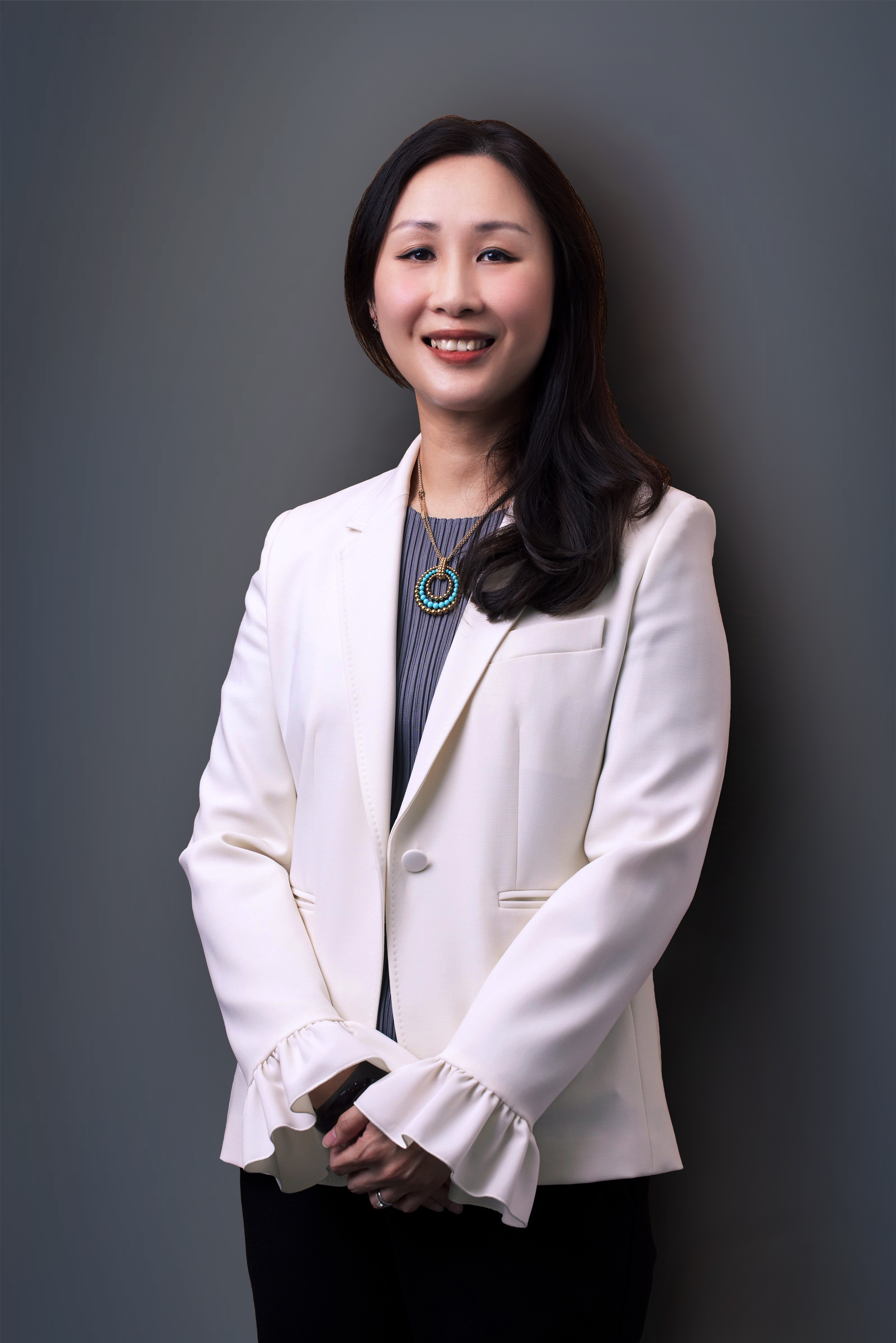
- Born: Liona Chiu Yee Poon; Hong Kong
- Known for: Prediction and prevention of preeclampsia. Prenatal diagnosis. High-risk obstetrics. Maternal Fetal Medicine.

Academic background
- Education: University of London, The Chinese University of Hong Kong

Academic work
- Institutions: Chinese University of Hong Kong; King's College London

Liona Poon is an obstetrician-gynaecologist with clinical research interests devoted to improving women's and children's health. Poon is currently a Professor (Clinical) at the Department of Obstetrics and Gynaecology at the Chinese University of Hong Kong and a visiting professor at the Department of Women and Children's Health, King's College London.

== Biography ==
Poon completed primary school (Holy Family Canossian School, St Frances of Assisi's Caritas School) and proceeded to secondary school at St Mary's Canossian College in 1991. At the age of 14, Poon decided to pursue a career as a clinical doctor, and in the same year, she left Hong Kong to study in the UK. She attended Abbots Bromley School for Girls, Staffordshire, UK, for GSCS and A levels. She received her Bachelor of Medicine and Surgery, MBBS degree at Guy's King's and St Thomas’ School of Medicine, University of London, in 2002, with distinction in Special Study Modules.

Her initial involvement in research was with Professor Nicolaides’ progesterone trial aimed at preventing preterm birth, and shortly afterwards she commenced her own postgraduate project on predicting preeclampsia in the first trimester. In 2011, one year after obtaining her MRCOG (Royal College of Obstetricians and Gynaecologists), Poon graduated with an MD(Res) degree, also at Guy's King's and St Thomas’ School of Medicine, under the supervision of Nicolaides.

In the last 20 years she has focused her research on establishing a programme for effective early prediction and prevention of preeclampsia.

Poon was the first researcher to have developed an effective first trimester prediction model based on a combination of maternal factors, blood pressure, uterine artery Doppler, serum pregnancy-associated plasma protein-A and placental growth factor for early-onset preeclampsia, achieving a detection rate of 90%, at 5% false-positive rate. Working together with the Fetal Medicine Foundation team, the first trimester prediction model has evolved from a multivariate logistic regression model to a novel Bayes theorem-based model that incorporates a survival-time model for the gestational age at delivery with preeclampsia. The benefit of using the Bayes theorem-based method is that when future research identifies new effective biomarkers, they can easily be incorporated within the Bayes paradigm.

In addition, Poon's work in the area of preeclampsia led to a double-blinded randomised controlled trial of low-dose aspirin in pregnancies identified as high-risk of preeclampsia following first-trimester screening (ASPRE trial). This study was awarded a major grant from the European Union 7th Framework Programme with Poon as the Co-Chief Investigator of the project. The trial demonstrated that the use of low-dose aspirin from 11 to 14 weeks’ gestation reduced the rate of preterm preeclampsia with delivery before 37 weeks’ gestation by 62%. This work has been published in the New England Journal of Medicine.

Poon relocated back to Hong Kong in 2016 and was appointed by The Chinese University of Hong Kong (CUHK) as an Associate Professor at the Department of Obstetrics and Gynaecology in 2016. In 2018, Poon was promoted to Professor (Clinical). In 2020, Poon was appointed as a trustee of the International Society of Ultrasound in Obstetrics and Gynecology. In 2024, she was appointed as President-elect (2024-2026) of the International Society of Ultrasound in Obstetrics and Gynecology.

In August 2022, Poon was appointed Chairperson of the Department of Obstetrics and Gynaecology, Chinese University of Hong Kong. In the same year, she obtained FHKCOG, FHKAM (Obstetrics and Gynaecology).

Poon undertook a prospective noninterventional multicentre validation study including 10,935 women in Asia between 2016 and 2018. The study demonstrated that the first-trimester triple test achieved comparable detection rates to that of the original study in Europe (detection rates: 64.0% and 75.8% for preterm preeclampsia; 49.3% and 65.6% for any-onset preeclampsia, at 10% and 20% false positive rates, respectively). Between 2019 and 2022, she conducted a study called “FORECAST” (Implementation of First-trimester Screening and Prevention of Pre-eclampsia Trial). This study evaluated the efficacy, acceptability, and safety of a first-trimester “screening-and-prevention” strategy for preterm-PE in Asian populations and demonstrated that among high-risk women in the intervention phase, aspirin prophylaxis was significantly associated with a 41% reduction in the incidence of preterm-PE in real-world settings.

In 2025, Poon was named one of Prestige Hong Kong's Women of Power. In the same year, she was honoured with the Croucher Senior Medical Research Fellowship 2026 by the Croucher Foundation in recognition of her outstanding contributions to medical research. In 2026, she received the 22nd AmCham Women of Influence award for Woman Change Maker in STEM award, for her pioneering work in maternal health, recognised for her innovation, evidence-based practices, and collaboration.
