= Stefan Semchyshyn =

- Semchyshyn
- Born: Stefan Semchyshyn; August 19, 1940 (age 85); Yugoslavia
- Citizenship: United States
- Occupations: MD, author
- Years active: 1971–2002

Stefan Semchyshyn (born 1940) is a professional obstetrician and gynecologist, and a maternal–fetal medicine specialist. He is the author of How to Prevent Miscarriage and Other Crises of Pregnancy.

After completing his studies, he started his career as a doctor of medicine. He supervised high risk deliveries; during his tenure, he was involved in over 3000 deliveries, with a 97.5 percent success rate in bringing high-risk pregnancies to term.

== Bibliography ==
- How to Prevent Miscarriage and Other Crises of Pregnancy, 1989 – publisher Macmillan Publishers, New York City
