= Fernando Alfageme =

Spanish dermatologist

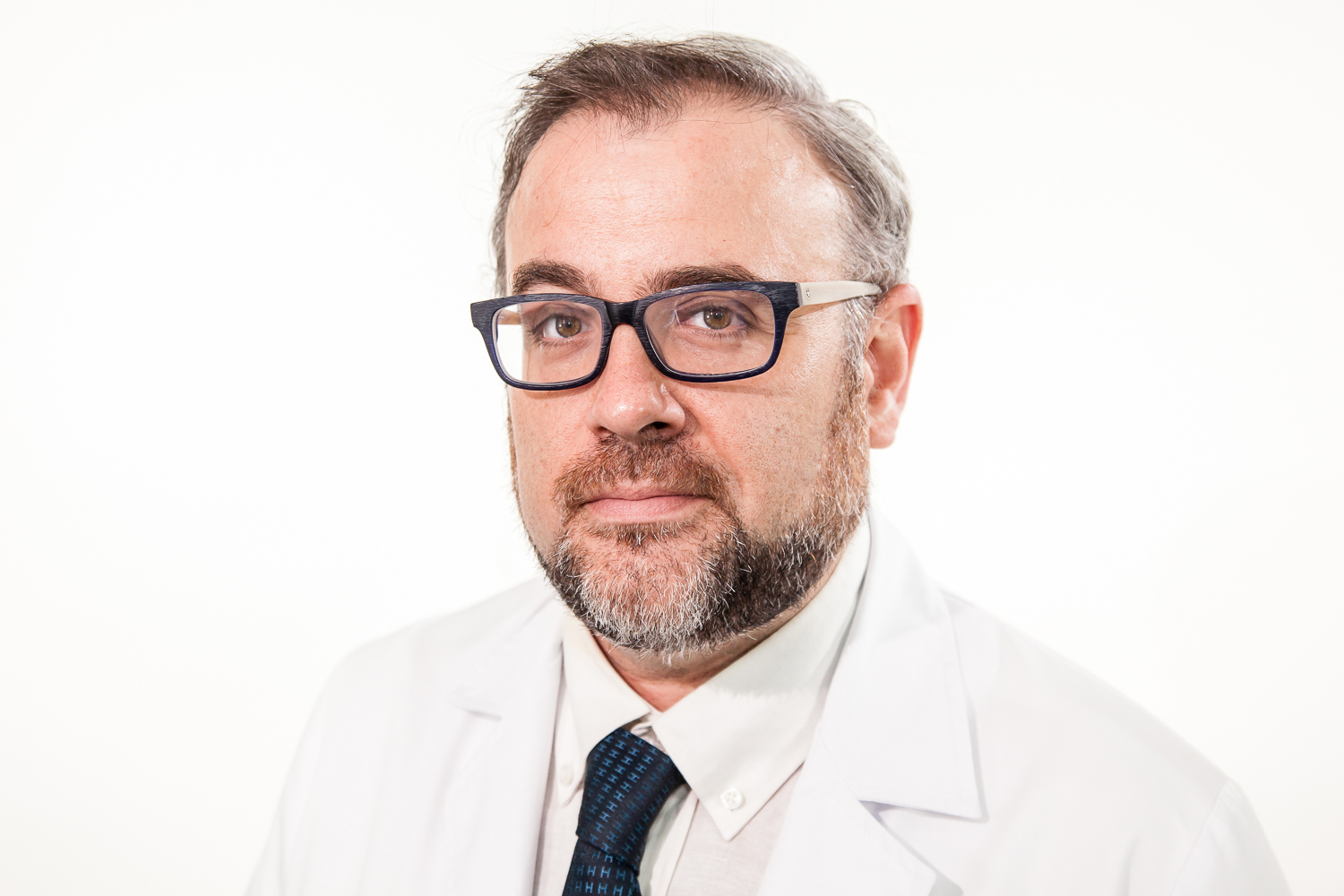
- Born: 9 July 1977 (age 48); Madrid
- Education: Universidad Autónoma de Madrid
- Known for: Cutaneous Ultrasound
- Medical career
- Institutions: Hospital Universitario Puerta de Hierro
- Research: Diagnostic Imaging in Dermatology
- Website: www.ecocutanea.com

Fernando Alfageme Roldán (born 9 July 1977) is a Spanish dermatologist. He introduced the diagnostic technique of cutaneous ultrasound in Spain, is an associate professor at the Autonomous University of Madrid, and is responsible for the Dermatological Ultrasound Unit at the Puerta de Hierro University Hospital in Majadahonda. He has authored several essays, manuals and academic articles about dermatology.

Roldán received a doctorate in Medicine and Surgery (UCM) with the thesis Children's Dermatological Surgery at the Gregorio Marañon Hospital: clinical analysis, economic profitability and post-surgical satisfaction in 2010 and is a graduate in Medicine from the Autonomous University of Madrid (2001). He specialized in diagnostic imaging in dermatology (dermatoscopy and cutaneous ultrasound) and its applications (teledermatology and minimally invasive interventionism).

In publishing the article "Cutaneous Ultrasound" in the journal Actas Dermo-Sifiliográficas (2014), Roldán introduced the diagnostic technique of cutaneous ultrasound in Spain, used for the first time in the Hispanic world by the radiologist Dr. Wortsman in Chile.

New investigations and applications of this diagnostic technique allowed for the detection of pathologies, including skin cancer or cutaneous melanoma. Cutaneous ultrasound is also used to diagnose inflammatory processes, nail disorders, hair diseases and derma-aesthetics.

Roldán is a member of the Spanish Academy of Dermatology and Venereology (AEDV), the Spanish Society of Ultrasound (SEECO), the International Dermoscopy Society (IDS), the American Institute of Ultrasound in Medicine (AIUM), and the European Nail Society.

== Publications ==
- "Manual de Ecografía Cutánea" (2013). ISBN 1480262706.
- "Handbook Of Skin Ultrasonography" (2013). ISBN 1480262846.
- "Ecografía cutánea Facial Práctica" (2013) ISBN 1492994545
- Alfageme F., Cerezo E., Roustan G., "Real-Time Elastography in Inflammatory Skin Diseases: A Primer.Ultrasound" in Medicine & Biology, Volume 41, Issue 4, Supplement, April 2015, Pages S82-S83.
- Alfageme Roldán F, Mollet Sánchez J, Cerezo López E. "Physical principles and general considerations". Actas Dermosifiliogr. 2015 Nov;106 Suppl 1:3-9. doi: 10.1016/S0001-7310(16)30002-3.
- Dermatologic Ultrasound with Clinical and Histological Correlation. Dra Wortsman Chapter. Ultrasound margin assessment. Dr. Alfageme ISBN 1461471834
