= Jasjit S. Suri =

American engineer

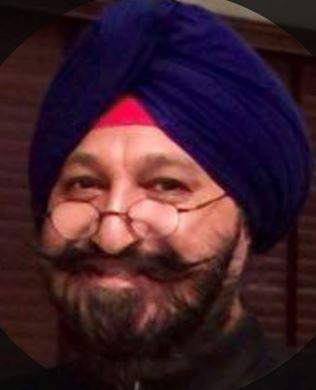
- Occupation: Engineer
- Known for: Artificial Intelligence in Healthcare

Jasjit S. Suri is an American engineer who works in the fields of biomedical engineering, computer science and clinical engineering. His work is focused on the implementation of artificial intelligence in biomedicine, and healthcare.

== Education and career ==
Suri received a master's degree in computer sciences from the University of Illinois Chicago. In 1997, he completed his PhD in electrical engineering at the University of Washington, Seattle. He later went back to Weatherhead School of Management at Case Western Reserve University, completing an MBA in 2004.

He has been a fellow of the American Institute for Medical and Biological Engineering (AIMBE) since 2004, American Institute of Ultrasound in Medicine (AIUM), Asia Pacific Vascular Society (APVS), and the Institute of Electrical and Electronics Engineers (IEEE).

Suri is the chairperson of AtheroPoint, a medical imaging company based in Roseville, CA.
