= Peter Libby =

American cardiologist

- Education: University of California, San Diego; Brigham and Women's Hospital
- Awards: Gold Medal of the European Society of Cardiology; Anitschkow award The Ernst Jung Gold Medal for Medicine; Earl Benditt award
- Scientific career
- Fields: cardiology
- Workplaces: Harvard Medical School at Brigham and Women's Hospital

Peter Libby is an American physician, focusing in atherosclerosis, cardiology, and cardiovascular prevention, currently the Mallinckrodt Professor of Medicine, Harvard Medical School at Mass General Brigham. and serves as President of the Residual Risk Reduction Initiative (R3i Foundation).

== Personal life ==
Dr. Peter Libby is a cardiovascular medicine specialist at Mass General Brigham, and the Mallinckrodt Professor of Medicine at Harvard Medical School (HMS). He was married to the late Professor Beryl Benacerraf. They have two children - Oliver and Brigitte.

Dr. Libby received his medical degree from the University of California, San Diego School of Medicine. He completed a residency in internal medicine and a fellowship in cardiovascular disease at Peter Bent Brigham Hospital (now Mass General Brigham Hospital). He also completed a research fellowship in cellular physiology at Harvard Medical School. Dr. Libby is board certified in internal medicine and in cardiovascular disease.

The author of some 550 original peer-reviewed publications, and some 600 reviews, chapters, or other publications, Dr. Libby also serves as an Editor of the leading textbook of cardiovascular medicine, Braunwald’s Heart Disease, and Executive Editor of the European Heart Journal. Dr. Libby's clinical and research interests include vascular biology, atherosclerosis and preventive cardiology. The research laboratory that Dr. Libby directs studies the messengers created by the body that may produce arterial plaque and blockages, as well as regulate normal and abnormal function of smooth muscle and endothelial cells that make up the wall of arteries and the inflammatory cells that contribute to cardiovascular diseases.

Dr. Libby is a pioneer in unraveling the role of inflammation in cardiovascular disease. He instigated and helped to lead the first large-scale clinical trial that demonstrated that targeting inflammation could reduce risk of cardiovascular events. Dr. Libby has been named a top cardiologist, and practices general and preventive cardiovascular medicine. His research has received funding from the American Heart Association, the National Institutes of Health, the Fondation Leducq, among other organizations. Among Dr. Libby’s over 100 trainees, many have achieved leadership positions on 4 continents. He initiated and leads for the Fundacão Lemann, a cardiovascular research fellowship program that has provided research training in Boston for over two dozen Brazilian physicians and scientists. Dr. Libby has received numerous recognitions worldwide including the highest research awards from the American Heart Association and American College of Cardiology, the Gold Medal of the European Society of Cardiology, the Anitschkow award from the European Atherosclerosis Society, The Ernst Jung Gold Medal for Medicine, and the Earl Benditt award for vascular biology among many others. He has delivered over 150 major named or keynote lectures worldwide.

Dr. Libby has been elected to or been named honorary member of learned societies in the U.S., Japan, and Europe. He has also been awarded honorary doctorate degrees from Harvard University, the University of Lille, Université Laval, and Goethe-Universität.
