= Montevideo units =

Montevideo units are a method of measuring uterine performance during labor. They were created in 1949 by two physicians, Roberto Caldeyro-Barcia and Hermogenes Alvarez, from Montevideo, Uruguay. They are exactly equal to 1 mmHg within 10 minutes. A standard adequate measurement is 200; this is generally equivalent to 27 kPa of combined pressure change within 10 minutes.

Units are directly equal to pressure change in mmHg summed over a ten-minute window. It is calculated by internally (not externally) measuring peak uterine pressure amplitude (in mmHg), subtracting the resting tone of the contraction, and adding up the numbers in a 10-minute period. Uterine pressure is generally measured through an intrauterine pressure catheter.

Montevideo units can be more simply calculated by summing the individual contraction intensities in a ten-minute period, a process which should arrive at a result identical to the original method of calculation.

Generally, above 200 MVUs is considered necessary for adequate labor during the active phase.

== Example ==
If, for instance:

- Peak uterine pressure amplitudes were 50 mmHg
- during the 10 minute period of measurement 3 contractions occurred
- subtract the resting tone from the peak intensity of the contraction
- add the 3 contractions together to get the MVUs
- Montevideo units are calculated by obtaining the peak uterine pressure amplitude and subtracting the resting tone. Then adding up those numbers generated by each contraction within a 10-minute window.
- For example, five contractions occurred, producing peak pressures of 55, 50, 45, 65, and 50 mm Hg, respectively. The resting tone of the contractions is 10.

55-10 = 45 50-10 = 40 45-10 = 35 65-10 = 55 50-10 = 40

45+40+35+55+40 = 215 MVUs
