= The Surgeon's Cut =

- Genre: Documentary
- Starring: Lin Gallagher
- Country of origin: United States
- Original language: English
- No. of seasons: 1
- No. of episodes: 4

Production
- Running time: 51–58 minutes
- Production company: BBC Studios Science Unit

Original release
- Network: Netflix
- Release: December 9, 2020

The Surgeon's Cut is a 2020 docuseries starring Lin Gallagher.

== Cast ==
- Lin Gallagher

== Episodes ==
No.	Title	Original release date
1	"Saving Life Before Birth"	December 9, 2020
An innovative, compassionate fetal medicine specialist, Dr. Kypros Nicolaides guides his patients through emotionally fraught pregnancy complications.
2	"Sacred Brain"	December 9, 2020
Opening the skull is sacred. Dr. Alfredo Quiñones-Hinojosa narrates his journey, steeped in metaphor, from migrant farmworker to premier neurosurgeon.
3	"Living Donor"	December 9, 2020
Shaped by horror films, feminism and an intellectually rigorous family, Dr. Nancy Ascher makes history as the first woman to perform a liver transplant.
4	"Heart & Soul"	December 9, 2020
After falling in love with the heart, Dr. Devi Shetty takes the next step by becoming a cardiac surgeon. Then a visit with Mother Teresa changes his life.

== Release ==
The Surgeon's Cut was released on December 9, 2020, on Netflix.
