= Alfredo Quiñones-Hinojosa =

American physician

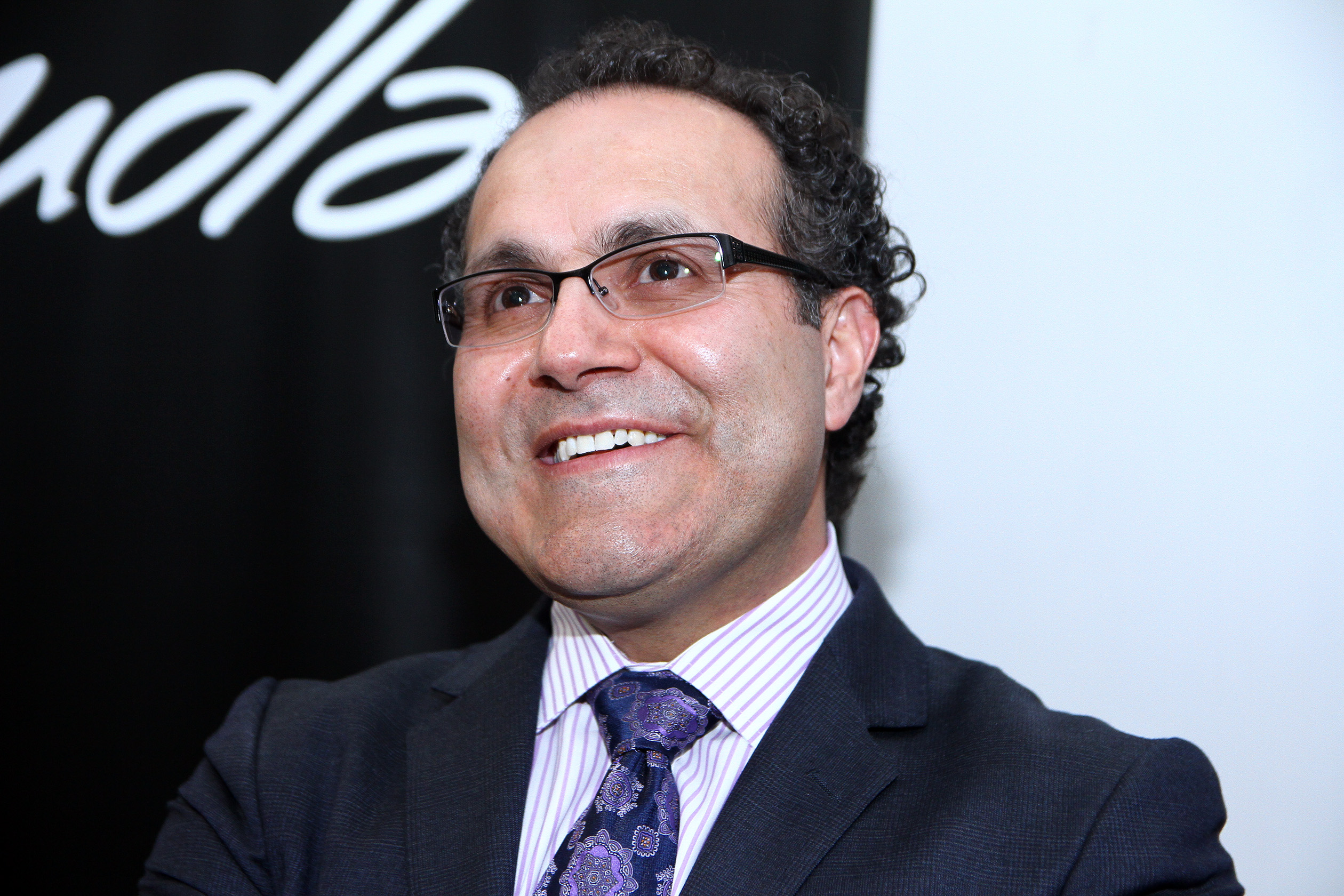
- Quiñones-Hinojosa in 2015
- Born: January 2, 1968 (age 58); Mexicali, Baja California, Mexico
- Other name: Dr. Q
- Citizenship: United States
- Education: University of California, Berkeley; Harvard Medical School
- Scientific career
- Fields: Neurosurgery
- Workplaces: Mayo Clinic; Johns Hopkins

Alfredo Quiñones-Hinojosa (also known as "Dr. Q") is a Mexican-American neurosurgeon, author, and researcher. He is the William J. and Charles H. Mayo Professor and Chair of Neurologic Surgery and runs a basic science research lab at the Mayo Clinic Jacksonville in Florida.

Quiñones is an editorial board member and reviewer for several publications. Most notably, he is the editor-in-chief for Schmidek and Sweet Operative Neurosurgical Techniques (6th edition). He is also one of the editors for Controversies in Neuro-Oncology: Best Evidence Medicine for Brain Tumor Surgery, which was awarded first prize by the British Medical Association. He is co-founder and serves as president of Mission: BRAIN, Bridging Resources and Advancing International Neurosurgery, a 501(c)(3) nonprofit foundation.

He has published an autobiography, Becoming Dr. Q, about his journey from migrant farm worker to neurosurgeon, and recently Disney with Plan B Entertainment productions announced that his life story is going to be featured in a movie.

== Early life ==
Quiñones was born in Mexicali, Baja California, México. He became interested in medicinal practices at an early age which may have been due to his younger sister's death from colitis and his sense of responsibility that came early on in life. Quiñones has said he was also inspired to pursue medicine by his grandmother, Nana Maria, who was a Mexican curandera (traditional healer) and midwife. In 1987, at the age of 19, Quiñones-Hinojosa went to the United States. Once arriving in the United States, Quiñones could not speak English and worked on farms outside of Fresno, California. As a farm hand, he saved enough money to take English classes.

== Education ==
Quiñones-Hinojosa started his education at San Joaquin Delta College in Stockton, California. He completed his bachelor's degree in psychology with the highest honors at University of California, Berkeley. He then went on to receive his medical degree from Harvard Medical School, where he graduated with honors. He also became a US citizen during this time. He then completed his residency in neurosurgery at the University of California, San Francisco, where he also completed a postdoctoral fellowship in developmental and stem cell biology at the laboratory of Professor Arturo Alvarez-Buylla.

== Professional career ==
Quiñones began his career at Johns Hopkins School of Medicine, where he became a Professor of Neurosurgery and Oncology, Neurology, and Cellular and Molecular Medicine and director of the Brain Tumor Stem Cell Biology Lab. Quiñones conducts both clinical and basic science research. From 2005 to 2016, his team published over 150 scientific articles and received 14 funding grants. Quiñones conducts numerous research efforts on elucidating the role of stem cells in the origin of brain tumors, and the potential role stem cells can play in fighting brain cancer and regaining neurological function. He has been actively involved in fundraisers for brain cancer research. He continues to participate at half-marathons with his research team and some of his own patients to raise money for cancer research.

== Books ==
Quiñones is the author of more than 50 book chapters, and has authored several textbooks on neurosurgical techniques and stem cell biology. In 2011, Quiñones edited Core Techniques in Operative Neurosurgery and published his autobiography, Becoming Dr Q: My Journey from Migrant Farm Worker to Brain Surgeon, which went on to earn him an International Latino Book Award in 2012. In 2012, Quiñones was the lead editor of the 6th edition of Schmidek and Sweet's Operative Neurosurgical Techniques, one of the world's preeminent textbooks of neurosurgery. He will also serve as the lead editor for the 7th edition of Schmidek and Sweet's Operative Neurosurgical Techniques. In 2013, Quiñones published Controversies in Neuro-Oncology: Best Evidence Medicine for Brain Tumor Surgery with Dr. Shaan Raza. The British Medical Association awarded Controversies in Neuro-Oncology first prize in Oncology in 2014. Quiñones is currently working on a first Video-Atlas of Neurosurgery that will be published in 2016.

== Publications ==
Among his published books, Quiñones also has a long list of publications, with his most notable article cited 1,856 times by fellow researchers. Some of his most cited and popular article publications, in descending order, include:

- 2010 Oxygen in stem cell biology: a critical component of the stem cell niche
- 2004 Unique astrocyte ribbon in adult human brain contains neural stem cells but lacks chain migration
- 2009 Independent association of extent of resection with survival in patients with malignant brain astrocytoma
- 2006 Cellular composition and cytoarchitecture of the adult human subventricular zone: a niche of neural stem cells

These are just a few of the countless publications Quiñones has produced.

== Awards and recognitions ==
- 1986 B.A. Escuela Normal Urbana Federal Fronteriza, Mexicali, Mexico - Social Sciences and Humanities, Multidisciplinary teaching license
- 1991 San Joaquin Delta Community College, Stockton, California - Transfer core curriculum to the University of California
- 1994 B.A. University of California, Berkeley, California - Highest Honors
- 1999 M.D. Harvard Medical School, Boston, Massachusetts - Cum Laude
- 2000 University of California, San Francisco, California (General Surgery) - Most Valuable Intern Award
- 2004 University of California, San Francisco, California (Residency - Neurosurgery) - Howard Naffziger Neurological Surgery Award
- 2006 Howard Hughes Institute - Physician-Scientist Career Award
- 2006 Association of American Medical Colleges - Herbert Nickens Award
- 2006 American Society of Clinical Oncology Foundation - Career Development Award
- 2006 American College of Surgeon - Franklin Martin Faculty Research Award
- 2006 Johns Hopkins University - Passano Physician Scientist Award
- 2007 Johns Hopkins Hospital - Department of Neurosurgery - Faculty Teaching Award (Richard J. Otenasek)
- 2007 Robert Wood Johnson Award
- 2007 Popular Science Magazine - Brilliant 10 Scientists Award
- 2007 Baltimore Magazine - US Top Docs
- 2008 Olender Foundation - America's Role Model Award
- 2010 Science & Engineering Festival - Nifty Fifty Scientist
- 2011 Baltimore Magazine - Baltimore Top Docs
- 2012 Named as Super Doctor
- 2012 Recipient of Ohtli Award
- 2015 VII Premio Iberoamericano Cortes de Cádiz Surgery Award, Spain
- 2015 Featured in Forbes México for his medical research and career
- 2018 Doctorate honoris cause, by University of Santander - UDES - Bucaramanga, COLOMBIA

== Television ==
Dr Q’s story was featured in ‘Hopkins’. Quiñones stars in the second episode of The Surgeon's Cut, produced by BBC Studios’ The Science Unit for Netflix which was released globally on 9 December 2020.

In the Immigration episode of Adam Ruins Everything, Quiñones-Hinojosa's name and picture (wearing a hat that says "Dr. Q" on it,) is featured in a lineup of some of the Mexican-American immigrants who have improved the United States.
