= Roberto Caldeyro-Barcia =

Uruguayan physician

- Born: 26 September 1921; Montevideo, Uruguay
- Died: 2 November 1996 (aged 75)
- Education: University of the Republic, Uruguay
- Years active: 1947–1996
- Known for: Montevideo units First continuous cardiotachogram Co-founder, World Congress of Perinatal Medicine; Founding editor, Journal of Perinatal Medicine
- Medical career
- Profession: Doctor
- Institutions: University of the Republic, Uruguay
- Sub-specialties: Maternal-fetal medicine
- Research: Maternal-fetal medicine

Roberto Caldeyro-Barcia (26 September 1921 – 2 November 1996) was a Uruguayan doctor who pioneered the field of maternal–fetal medicine, or perinatology. His research with Dr. Hermógenes Alvarez created Montevideo units, a measure of uterine performance during labor. He was a founding editor of the Journal of Perinatal Medicine, a widely published author, a lecturer, and as of 2010 the only Uruguayan to be nominated for a Nobel Prize.

== Early life ==
Caldeyro-Barcia's father, Joaquin, was a physician. His mother, Elvira, came from a family with a medical background.

While attending the English School in Montevideo, Caldeyro-Barcia was given the nickname "Bobby" by the headmistress, Ivy Thomas. His family and close friends called him "Bobby" throughout his life.

Caldeyro-Barcia enjoyed sports; at the age of 15, he started to court his neighbor and horseback-riding partner, Ofelia Stajano. They became engaged in 1945, and were married in 1946.

At age 17, Caldeyro-Barcia started studies under the Faculty of Medicine at the University of the Republic in Uruguay. He specialized in obstetrical physiology under the influence of outstanding researchers like Corneille Heymans (winner of the Nobel Prize for Physiology or Medicine, 1938) and Bernardo Houssay (co-winner of the Nobel Prize for Physiology or Medicine, 1947). He qualified in medicine nine years later.

== Early career ==
Barcia graduated in December 1947. Upon graduating, he was appointed assistant professor of physiology in the Institute of Physiology in Montevideo.

At the School of Medicine of Montevideo, he was instructor of physiology (1942–1947), assistant professor of physiology (1948), associate professor of physiology (1950), head of the Department of Obstetrical Physiology (1959), and professor and chairman of physiology (until 1965).

=== Montevideo units ===
In 1947, while still a medical student, Caldeyro-Barcia first collaborated with his Professor of Obstetrics, Hermógenes Alvarez. Together, they established a tracing system to monitor intrauterine amniotic pressure during pregnancy and labor by measuring the intensity and frequency of contractions and the uterine tone, making it possible to analyze and define uterine contractility during pregnancy and childbirth. This research—which included the first recording of human uterus activity during labor— led to the duo's creation of Montevideo units to quantify uterine activity, now a worldwide standard in perinatal care.

In 1950, he recorded for the first time intramiometrial pressure in different parts of the uterus during labor, defining the pattern of normal uterine contractility having a "triple descendant gradient".

== Later career ==
In 1958, Caldeyro-Barcia and Alvarez developed a method to measure the effect of uterine contractions on fetal heart rate, which would later become the basis of fetal monitoring, commonly used to monitor the fetus's response to contractions during labor and to prevent any neurological damage resulting from oxygen deprivation. They defined normal and abnormal responses of the fetus through the continuous monitoring of fetal heart rate. The pair referred to the typical abnormal response of the fetal heart rate during labor as "type II DIP"; the term was later changed to late deceleration by other researchers.

Caldeyro-Barcia and his staff developed sub partu tocolysis in 1969. This ability to suppress premature labor may overcome around 70 percent of sub partu complications, avoiding unnecessary surgery.

In 1970, the Pan American Health Organization created the first Latin American Center of Perinatology (CLAP) in Montevideo, appointing Caldeyro-Barcia as its director. This became a training and reference center for professionals from Latin America and elsewhere. It provided training to doctors from Switzerland, the United States, Germany, Japan, Sweden, Spain, as well as a vast number of Latin Americans, many of whom are today faculty members in their countries of origin.

Together with Edward Hon, Stanley James, and Erich Saling, Caldeyro-Barcia was a founding editor of the Journal of Perinatal Medicine. The four founded the journal in 1973. Caldeyro-Barcia remained an editor of the journal until his death.

From 1976 to 1979, Caldeyro-Barcia was the president of the International Federation of Gynecology and Obstetrics (FIGO). He was president of the organization's 1979 World Congress in Moscow.

The World Association of Perinatal Medicine, the first world congress of this speciality, was founded in Tokyo in 1991 by a number of renowned scientists including Caldeyro-Barcia and Saling. Caldeyro-Barcia chaired the general assembly held immediately after the congress concluded, during which the international body's name was established.

After Caldeyro-Barcia retired from the chair in Gynaecology at the University of the Republic, which was created for him, the government of Uruguay appointed him to direct a program that developed basic sciences at the university: Programa de Desarrollo de las Ciencias Básicas (PEDECIBA, "Program for the Development of Basic Sciences"). He held the post from 1984 until his death.

== Awards ==
Caldeyro-Barcia received more than 300 awards, including:

Abraham Horwitz Award in Inter-American Health
1984

He was nominated three times for the Nobel Prize.

=== Honorary degrees ===
- PhD, University of Santiago de Compostela, 1978

== Legacy ==
The Global Congress of Maternal and Infant Health established the Roberto Caldeyro-Barcia Prize in Perinatal Medicine. Presented during the congress's opening ceremonies in Barcelona, Spain in September 2010, the prize winner must be an expert in obstetrics and perinatal medicine. The winner receives an award of 5,000 Euros and a diploma.
