= Journal of Ultrasound in Medicine =

- Discipline: Medicine
- Language: English

Publication details
- Publisher: Wiley
- Impact factor: 2.754 (2021)

Standard abbreviations
- ISO 4: J. Ultrasound Med.

Indexing
- ISSN: 1550-9613

Links
- Journal homepage; Online archive

Journal of Ultrasound in Medicine is a medical journal that covers aspects of medical ultrasound, mainly its direct application to patient care but also relevant basic science, and biological effects etc. The journal is published by Wiley.

== Abstracting and indexing ==
The journal is abstracted and indexed in:

- Basic Science
- Breast Ultrasound
- Contrast-Enhanced Ultrasound
- Dermatology
- Echocardiography
- Elastography
- Emergency Medicine
- Fetal Echocardiography

According to the Journal Citation Reports, the journal has a 2021 impact factor of 2.754.
