= Fetal surgery =

Growing branch of maternal-fetal medicine

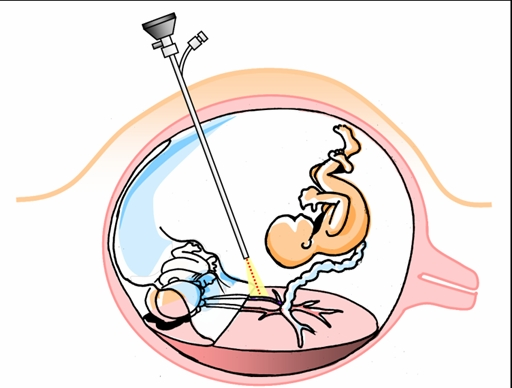
- Schematic illustration of endoscopic fetal surgery for twin-to-twin transfusion syndrome
- Other names: Antenatal surgery
- ICD-9-CM: 75.36

Fetal surgery, also known as antenatal surgery or prenatal surgery, is a growing branch of maternal-fetal medicine that covers any of a broad range of surgical techniques that are used to treat congenital abnormalities in fetuses who are still in the pregnant uterus. There are three main types: open fetal surgery, which involves completely opening the uterus to operate on the fetus; minimally invasive fetoscopic surgery, which uses small incisions and is guided by fetoscopy and sonography; and percutaneous fetal therapy, which involves placing a catheter under continuous ultrasound guidance.

The ultimate goal of contemporary fetal interventions is to interrupt the process of pathophysiology before secondary end-organ damage occurs. This is important to change the focus of the surgery from anatomic repair to the management of diseases.

Fetal intervention is relatively new. Advancing technologies allow earlier and more accurate diagnosis of diseases and congenital problems in a fetus.

Fetal surgery draws principally from the fields of surgery, obstetrics and gynecology, and pediatrics- especially the sub-specialties of neonatology (care of newborns), maternal-fetal medicine (care of high-risk pregnancies), and pediatric surgery. It often involves training in obstetrics, pediatrics, and mastery of both invasive and non-invasive surgical techniques. Because of the very high risk and technical complexity of fetal surgery, the procedure is usually performed at specialist centers.

Fetal intervention involves risk to fetus and pregnant patient alike. In addition to the general risks associated with any surgery, there is also a risk that scarring of the uterus will lead to difficulties with future pregnancies. This risk is higher than for a typical Cesarean section, for several reasons:

- the incision is usually a classical vertical one, with a greater risk of complications in subsequent pregnancies;
- the longer duration of the surgery, while the fetal intervention is performed;
- a second surgery is required days or weeks later – a Caesarean section to deliver the baby, which brings its own set of risks.

== Types ==
Fetal surgery

=== Open fetal surgery ===
==== Technique ====
Tocolytics are generally given to prevent labor; however, these should not be given if the risk is higher for the fetus inside the womb than if delivered, such as may be the case in intrauterine infection, unexplained vaginal bleeding and fetal distress. An H_{2} antagonist is usually given for anaesthesia the evening before and the morning of the operation, and an antacid is usually given before induction to reduce the risk of acid aspiration. Rapid sequence induction is often used for sedation and intubation.

Open fetal surgery is similar in many respects to a normal cesarean section performed under general anesthesia, except that the fetus remains dependent on the placenta and is returned to the uterus. A hysterotomy is performed on the pregnant woman, and once the uterus is open and the fetus is exposed, the fetal surgery begins. Typically, this surgery consists of an interim procedure intended to allow the fetus to remain in utero until it has matured enough to survive delivery and neonatal surgical procedures.

Upon completion of the fetal surgery, the fetus is put back inside the uterus and the uterus and abdominal wall are closed up. Before the last stitch is made in the uterine wall, the amniotic fluid is replaced. The mother remains in the hospital for 3–7 days for monitoring. Often babies who have been operated on in this manner are born pre-term. Some of the maternal risks identfied through randomized trials include high prevalence of spontaneous rupture of membranes (46% in prenatal surgical cases versus 8% postnatally), spontaneous onset of labor (38% vs 14%, respectively with prenatal and postnatal intervention), chorioamnionitis (26% in prenatal intervention), and pulmonary edema (6% in prenatal intervention) as seen in the MOMS trial.

==== Safety and complications ====
The main priority is maternal safety, avoiding preterm labor and achieving the aims of the surgery. The risk of premature labor is increased by concomitant risk factors such as multiple gestation, a history of maternal smoking, and very young or old maternal age. Risks of fetal surgery, specifically prenatal spina bifida repair, include premature rupture of membranes, uterine rupture in future pregnancies, premature birth and intraspinal inclusion cysts or a tethered cord in the fetus or newborn baby.

Open fetal surgery has proven to be reasonably safe for the mother. For the fetus, safety and effectiveness are variable, and depend on the specific procedure, the reasons for the procedure, and the gestational age and condition of the fetus. The overall perinatal mortality after open surgery has been estimated to be approximately 6%, according to a study in the United States 2003.

All future pregnancies for the mother require cesarean delivery because of the hysterotomy. Fetal surgery is not thought to decrease maternal fertility.

==== Indications ====
Surgical candidacy carries significant restrictions. This diagnosis applies to the situation of a progressive, single organ disease, as there must be significant probability of both morbidity and mortality to either, or both, fetus and maternal. This must occur without the impact of lethal anomalies, severe chromosomal aberrations, or medical complications of the mother that the obstetrician or maternal-fetal medicine specialist deems sufficiently restrictive. Neural tube defects (NTD), which begin to become observable at the 28th day of pregnancy, occur when the embryonic neural tube fails to close properly, the developing brain and spinal cord are openly exposed to amniotic fluid. After birth, exposure of the spinal cord to the outside environment (myelomeningocele or spina bifida) is associated with several morbidities including weakness or sensory deficits in the lower extremities, bladder dysfunction, fluid buildup in the brain and Type 2 Chiari malformations (herniation of the cerebellar vermis and medulla from the brain into the spinal canal. Prenatal repair of spina bifida is available in specialty centers. Fetuses treated with prenatal fetal repair have significantly improved outcomes compared to children whose defects are repaired shortly after birth. Specifically, fetal repair reduces the rate of hydrocephalus, ventriculoperitoneal shunt dependence, and Chiari malformation. Prenatal repair also shows improved motor skills at 30 months and improved mobility, neuropsychological function, and independent functioning between the ages of 5 and 10. In the landmark MOMS randomized controlled trial, prenatal myelomeningocele closure resulted in signifncatly fewer ventriculoperitoneal shunts (40% vs 82%, respectively) at one year of life, and reduced hindbrain herniation (64% with prenatal closure vs 96% with postnatal closure). There was a double the number of participants that demonstrated ambulation independent of any physical support at 30 months, when compared to postnatal closure, showing a very close-to-normal projection in the development of lower extremity neurological capacity.

Other conditions that potentially are treated by open fetal surgery include:

- Congenital diaphragmatic hernia (if indicated at all, it is now more likely to be treated by endoscopic fetal surgery)
- Congenital cystic adenomatoid malformation
- Congenital heart disease
- Pulmonary sequestration
- Sacrococcygeal teratoma

=== Minimally invasive fetal surgery ===
Minimally-invasive fetoscopic surgery has proven to be useful for some fetal conditions.

- Twin-twin transfusion syndrome – Laser Ablation of Vessels
- Spina bifida – Fetoscopic closure of the malformation. Prenatal repair of the spina bifida lesion through this approach has been purported to result in less complications to the mother, whilst affording benefit to the baby.

=== Prenatal therapeutic interventions, non-surgical ===
Non-surgical prenatal therapeutic interventions have been explored for genetic disorders in which disease mechanisms begin before birth. In 2025, Finkel and colleagues reported prenatal administration of risdiplam, an orally administered small-molecule RNA-targeted splicing modifier of SMN2, for a fetus diagnosed with spinal muscular atrophy caused by biallelic loss of SMN1. The treatment was initiated during pregnancy and continued after birth, with the authors reporting apparent amelioration of spinal muscular atrophy through 30 months of follow-up. Related translational studies have also used prenatal human models to evaluate RNA-targeted therapies for severe epilepsies associated with death in children, such as KCNT1 that is functionally active in prenatal and neonatal human brain tissue and that antisense oligonucleotide knockdown altered disease-relevant neuronal firing in patient-derived IPSC neurons and mid-gestation primary human neurons.

== History ==
Fetal surgical techniques were first developed at the University of California, San Francisco, in 1980 using animal models.

On April 26, 1981, the first successful human open fetal surgery in the world was performed at University of California, San Francisco, under the direction of Dr. Michael Harrison. The fetus in question had a congenital hydronephrosis, a blockage in the urinary tract that caused the kidney to dangerously extend. To correct this a vesicostomy was performed by placing a catheter in the fetus to allow the urine to be released normally. The blockage itself was removed surgically after birth.

Further advances have been made in the years since this first operation. New techniques have allowed additional defects to be treated and for less invasive forms of fetal surgical intervention.

The first two percutaneous ultrasound-guided fetal balloon valvuloplasties, a type of fetal surgery for severe aortic valve obstruction in the heart, were reported in 1991. Among the first dozen reported attempts at this repair in the 1990s, only two children survived long-term. Dr. Oluyinka Olutoye, alongside Darrell Cass, from the Texas Children's Fetal Centre, removed a 23-week-old fetus from her mother's womb in order to perform surgery upon a spinal tumor she had. The girl was placed back in the womb after a five-hour surgery and was born without complications.

In March 2020, a team of more than 20 specialists led by Mert Ozan Bahtiyar at Yale-New Haven Hospital performed the first open in-utero repair of myelomeningocele in Connecticut, during the early stages of the COVID-19 pandemic.

== See also ==
- Fetoscopy
- EXIT procedure
- Maternal-fetal medicine, a discipline of high-risk obstetrics and gynecology; most fetal surgeons were previously trained in OB-GYN and maternal-fetal medicine before their fetal surgical training
- Neonatology and neonatal surgery, related to high risk OB-GYN and maternal-fetal medicine and fetal surgery, are branches of pediatrics and pediatric surgery that focus on the treatment of newborn infants (less than one month of age)
- Pediatric surgery, a related but distinct discipline of surgery and pediatrics, involving surgery on infants, toddlers, and children and adolescents
- MOMS Trial
- Spina bifida
- NAFTNet
- Samuel Armas
