= In the Womb =

American and British TV series or program

- DVD cover
- Also known as: Life Before Birth (UK special)
- Genre: Documentary; Science; Nature
- Created by: Toby Macdonald
- Countries of origin: United Kingdom; United States
- Original language: English
- No. of episodes: 8

Production
- Running time: 90 minutes

Original release
- Network: National Geographic Channel
- Release: March 6, 2005 – June 11, 2010

In the Womb is a documentary television special miniseries that was premiered on March 6, 2005, on the National Geographic Channel. Originally beginning as a special about human pregnancy (titled Life Before Birth in the UK), the program features the development of embryos in the uterus of various animal species. The show makes extensive use of computer-generated imagery to recreate the real stages of the process.

== Episodes ==
No.	Title	Original release date
1	"In the Womb"	March 6, 2005
Features the human embryo.
2	"Animals in the Womb"	December 10, 2006
Features the development of embryos of a dolphin, elephant and dog.
3	"In the Womb: Multiples"	January 14, 2007
Features the development of multiple human embryos.
4	"In the Womb: Identical Twins"	December 12, 2008
Features the development of identical twins.
5	"In the Womb: Dogs"	January 4, 2009
Features the developments of a mastiff, Golden Retriever, Chihuahua, and wolf.
6	"In the Womb: Cats"	January 4, 2009
Features the developments of a domestic cat and lion.
7	"In the Womb: Extreme Animals"	May 10, 2009
Features the developments of a lemon shark, emperor penguin, red kangaroo and parasitic wasp.
8	"In the Womb: Animal Farms"	June 11, 2010
Features the developments of a cattle, goat, sheep, pig.

== See also ==
- List of programs broadcast by National Geographic Channel
