= Fetoscopy =

Endoscopic procedure during pregnancy

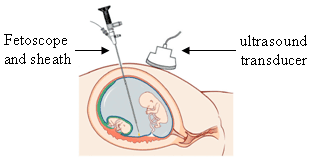
- Fetal endoscope
- ICD-9-CM: 75.31
- MeSH: D005332

Fetoscopy is an endoscopic procedure during pregnancy to allow surgical access to the fetus, the amniotic cavity, the umbilical cord, and the fetal side of the placenta. A small (3–4 mm) incision is made in the abdomen, and an endoscope is inserted through the abdominal wall and uterus into the amniotic cavity. Fetoscopy allows for medical interventions such as a biopsy (tissue sample) or a laser occlusion of abnormal blood vessels (such as chorioangioma) or the treatment of spina bifida.

Fetoscopy is usually performed in the second or third trimester of pregnancy. The procedure can place the fetus at increased risk of adverse outcomes, including fetal loss or preterm delivery, so the risks and benefits must be carefully weighed in order to protect the health of the mother and fetus(es). The procedure is typically performed in an operating room by an obstetrician-gynecologist.

== History ==
In 1945, Björn Westin published a study which documented his use of a panendoscope to directly observe embryos. In 1966, Agüero et al. published a study which used hysteroscopy to observe various features of the fetus, cervix, and uterus. In 1972, Carlo Valenti of the SUNY Downstate Medical Center recorded a technique which he called "endoamnioscopy", which allowed for direct visualization of the developing fetus. Gallinat made the first attempt to standardize these techniques in 1978.

Because of the invasiveness of these procedures and the high risk they posed to the fetus, they were largely discarded in favor of transvaginal sonography until the 1990s. By that time, smaller instruments had been developed which reduced the risk to the fetus and provided a better visual for the physician. This in turn allowed for the development of techniques for surgical interventions such as biopsy. By 1993, authors such as Cullen, Ghirardini, and Reece had referred to this technique as "fetoscopy".

The field of minimally-invasive surgical fetoscopy has continued to develop since the 2000s. Physicians such as Michael Belfort and Ruben Quintero have used the technique to remove tumors and correct spina bifida on fetuses within the uterus.

== Non-surgical fetoscopes ==
Fetoscopy is a surgical procedure which may involve the use of a fibreoptic device called a fetoscope. Some confusion may arise from the use of specialized forms of stethoscopes, including Pinard horns and Doppler wands, to audibly monitor fetal heart rate (FHR). These audio diagnostic tools are also called "fetoscopes" but are not related to visual fetoscopy.

== See also ==
- Diaphragmatic hernia
- Fetal intervention
- Minimally invasive surgery
- Myelomeningocele
- Twin-to-twin transfusion syndrome
