= International Society of Ultrasound in Obstetrics and Gynecology =

Professional medical organisation

- Abbreviation: ISUOG
- Formation: 1991
- Headquarters: 122 Freston Road, London W10 6TR, UK
- Members: 13,000 members
- Website: www.isuog.org

The International Society of Ultrasound in Obstetrics and Gynecology (ISUOG, the Society for Women's Imaging) is a professional membership association and charity registered in England and Wales. ISUOG represents and supports professionals using ultrasonography in obstetric and gynecologic practice across the world, currently including obstetricians, gynecologists, sonographers, radiographers, radiologists, midwives, maternal fetal medicine and other subspecialty medical professionals across 126 countries.

== Foundation ==
ISUOG was founded in 1991 by Prof Stuart Campbell (President 1991–1998). The Society held its first annual World Congress in London in January 1991, which was attended by just over 1,000 delegates that were also its founding members.

== Core activities ==
=== Journal ===
Ultrasound in Obstetrics & Gynecology
- Discipline: Obstetrics and gynecology
- Language: English
- Edited by: Anthony Odibo

Publication details
- History: 1991-present
- Publisher: John Wiley & Sons on behalf of ISUOG
- Frequency: Monthly
- Open access: Hybrid
- Impact factor: 7.299 (2020)

Standard abbreviations
- ISO 4: Ultrasound Obstet. Gynecol.

Indexing
- ISSN: 1469-0705

Links
- Journal homepage

ISUOG has a monthly peer-reviewed journal, Ultrasound in Obstetrics & Gynecology. According to the Journal Citation Reports, the journal has a 2020 impact factor of 7.299, ranking it 5th out of 83 journals in the category "Obstetrics & Gynecology". The editor-in-chief is Anthony Odibo. Regular features include original articles, case reports, opinion articles and systematic reviews. Each month at least one article is selected to be free access and Journal Club slides are produced on a paper of high clinical impact.

=== World Congress ===
Since 1991, ISUOG has hosted the annual World Congress to facilitate the communication and dissemination of the latest research findings and discussion around current clinical management issues, and to encourage research collaboration.

=== Education ===
ISUOG provides educational opportunities to its members, including its Intensive Education Course program and extensive online education resources. ISUOG also provides support for groups and regions with lesser resources, through its free Trainee membership program and via membership inclusion for international education courses approved by ISUOG (ISUOG Approved courses).

=== Outreach ===
ISUOG's first Outreach program was developed with the support of the World Health Organization (WHO) and funding from the National Center for Fetal Medicine (NCFM, Norway), and the Norwegian government. The first Outreach course took place in Manila, the Philippines, in 1996. Outreach is committed to improving maternal healthcare services in underserved regions of the world by:

- Promoting and providing high-quality education in ultrasound in obstetrics and gynecology
- Improving the availability of ultrasound
- Increasing the potential to diagnose life-threatening obstetric complications and gynecological conditions
- "Training trainers"

Since its foundation, ISUOG Outreach has trained more than 130 professionals in countries including Mongolia, Ghana, Somaliland, Haiti and South Africa, as well as resourcing projects to help Australia's aboriginal communities and refugee communities in Syria and Lebanon.

== Membership and governance ==
ISUOG's international membership, including its Board of twenty Trustees, Editorial Board and Committee members, collaborate to develop education and training programs, and disseminate scientific research in support of the Society's mission to improve maternal health. The Trustees of the charity (also Directors of the company) are responsible for the financial and strategic direction of the Society.
