= American Institute of Ultrasound in Medicine =

Medical organization

The American Institute of Ultrasound in Medicine (AIUM) is a multidisciplinary association dedicated to advancing the use of ultrasound in medicine through professional and public education, research, development of guidelines, and accreditation.

The AIUM's membership consists of more than 10,000 sonographers, physicians, scientists, engineers, other health care providers, manufacturers of ultrasound equipment, and students. The AIUM is directed by a Board of governors and Executive Committee who are assisted by committees and a Council on Sections, representing many ultrasound specialties. The AIUM's official journal is the Journal of Ultrasound in Medicine.
