= Maternal–fetal medicine =

Branch of medicine

Maternal-fetal medicine
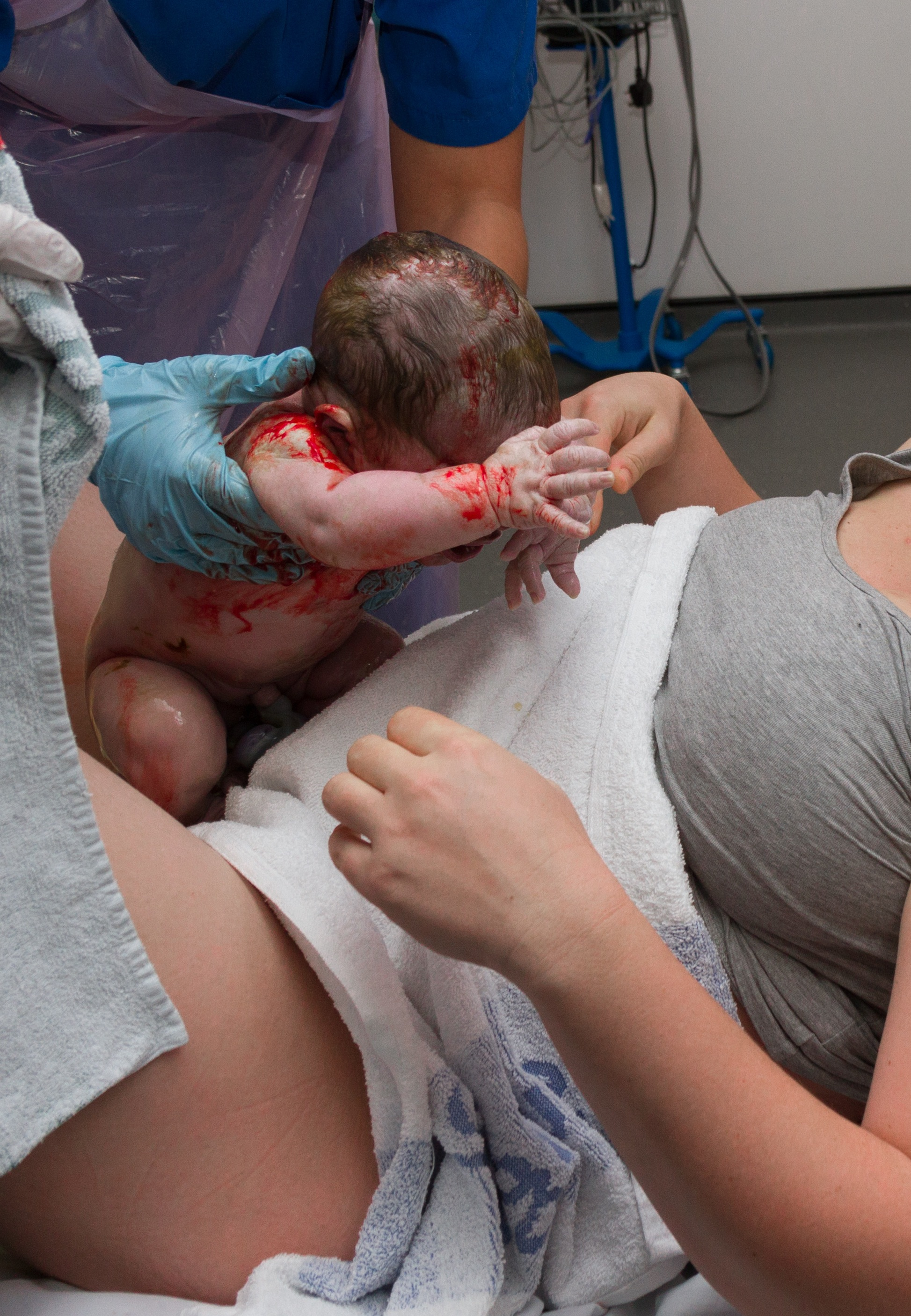
- An infant at the moment of birth
- Focus: Mothers and newborns
- Significant diseases: Complications of pregnancy; Congenital disorders
- Significant tests: Amniocentesis; Non-Stress Test; Chorionic villus sampling; Ultrasound; Fetoscopy
- Specialist: maternal–fetal medicine (MFM) specialist or perinatologist

Maternal–fetal medicine (MFM), also known as perinatology or feto-maternal medicine, is a branch of medicine that focuses on managing health concerns of the mother and fetus prior to, during, and shortly after pregnancy.

Maternal–fetal medicine specialists are physicians who subspecialize within the field of obstetrics. Their training typically includes a four-year residency in obstetrics and gynecology followed by a three-year fellowship. They may perform prenatal tests, provide treatments, and perform surgeries. They act both as a consultant during lower-risk pregnancies and as the primary obstetrician in especially high-risk pregnancies. After birth, they may work closely with pediatricians or neonatologists. For the mother, perinatologists assist with pre-existing health concerns, as well as complications caused by pregnancy.

== History ==
Maternal–fetal medicine began to emerge as a discipline in the 1960s. Advances in research and technology allowed physicians to diagnose and treat fetal complications in utero, whereas previously, obstetricians could only rely on heart rate monitoring and maternal reports of fetal movement. The development of amniocentesis in 1952, fetal blood sampling during labor in the early 1960s, more precise fetal heart monitoring in 1968, and real-time ultrasound in 1971 resulted in early intervention and lower mortality rates. In 1963, Albert William Liley developed a course of intrauterine transfusions for Rh incompatibility at the National Women's Hospital in Australia, regarded as the first fetal treatment. Other antenatal treatments, such as the administration of glucocorticoids to speed lung maturation in neonates at risk for respiratory distress syndrome, led to improved outcomes for premature infants.

Consequently, organizations were developed to focus on these emerging medical practices, and in 1991, the First International Congress of Perinatal Medicine was held, at which the World Association of Perinatal Medicine was founded.

Today, maternal-fetal medicine specialists can be found in major hospitals internationally. They may work in privately owned clinics, or in larger, government-funded institutions.

The field of maternal-fetal medicine is one of the most rapidly evolving fields in medicine, especially with respect to the fetus. Research is being carried on in the field of fetal gene and stem cell therapy in hope to provide early treatment for genetic disorders, open fetal surgery for the correction of birth defects like congenital heart disease, and the prevention of preeclampsia.

== Scope of practice ==
Maternal–fetal medicine specialists attend to patients who fall within certain levels of maternal care. These levels correspond to health risks for the baby, mother, or both, during pregnancy.

They take care of pregnant women who have chronic conditions (e.g. heart or kidney disease, hypertension, diabetes, and thrombophilia), pregnant women who are at risk for pregnancy-related complications (e.g. preterm labor, pre-eclampsia, and twin or triplet pregnancies), and pregnant women with fetuses at risk. Fetuses may be at risk due to chromosomal or congenital abnormalities, maternal disease, infections, genetic diseases and growth restriction.

Expecting mothers with chronic conditions, such as high blood pressure, drug use during or before pregnancy, or a diagnosed medical condition may require a consult with a maternal-fetal specialist. In addition, women who experience difficulty conceiving may be referred to a maternal-fetal specialist for assistance.

During pregnancy, a variety of complications of pregnancy can arise. Depending on the severity of the complication, a maternal-fetal specialist may meet with the patient intermittently, or become the primary obstetrician for the length of the pregnancy. Post-partum, maternal-fetal specialists may follow up with a patient and monitor any medical complications that may arise.

The rates of maternal and infant mortality due to complications of pregnancy have decreased by over 23% since 1990, from 377,000 deaths to 293,000 deaths. Most deaths can be attributed to infection, maternal bleeding, and obstructed labor, and their incidence of mortality vary widely internationally. The Society for Maternal-fetal Medicine (SMFM) strives to improve maternal and child outcomes by standards of prevention, diagnosis and treatment through research, education and training.

== Training ==
Maternal–Fetal Medicine Specialist
Occupation
- Names: Physician; Surgeon
- Occupation type: Specialty
- Activity sectors: Medicine, Surgery

Description
- Education required: Doctor of Medicine (M.D.); Doctor of Osteopathic medicine (D.O.); Bachelor of Medicine, Bachelor of Surgery (M.B.B.S.); Bachelor of Medicine, Bachelor of Surgery (MBChB)
- Fields of employment: Hospitals, Clinics

Maternal–fetal medicine specialists are obstetrician-gynecologists who undergo an additional three years of specialized training in the assessment and management of high-risk pregnancies. In the United States, such obstetrician-gynecologists are certified by the American Board of Obstetrician Gynecologists (ABOG) or the American Osteopathic Board of Obstetrics and Gynecology.

Maternal–fetal medicine specialists have training in obstetric ultrasound, invasive prenatal diagnosis using amniocentesis and chorionic villus sampling, and the management of high-risk pregnancies. Some are further trained in the field of fetal diagnosis and prenatal therapy where they become competent in advanced procedures such as targeted fetal assessment using ultrasound and Doppler, fetal blood sampling and transfusion, fetoscopy, and open fetal surgery.

For the ABOG, MFM subspecialists are required to do a minimum of 12 months in clinical rotation and 18-months in research activities. They are encouraged to use simulation and case-based learning incorporated in their training, a certification in advanced cardiac life support (ACLS) is required, they are required to develop in-service examination and expand leadership training. Obstetrical care and service has been improved to provide academic advancement for MFM in-patient directorships, improve skills in coding and reimbursement for maternal care, establish national, stratified system for levels of maternal care, develop specific, proscriptive guidelines on complications with highest maternal morbidity and mortality, and finally, increase departmental and divisional support for MFM subspecialists with maternal focus. As Maternal–fetal medicine subspecialists improve their work ethics and knowledge of this advancing field, they are capable of reducing the rate of maternal mortality and maternal morbidity.

== See also ==
- Advanced Life Support in Obstetrics (ALSO)
- Roberto Caldeyro-Barcia
