= Pioneers of surfactant research =

Pioneers of surfactant research is a list of people who were instrumental in the development of pulmonary surfactants for the treatment of infant respiratory distress syndrome.

== List of pioneers ==
Year	Names	Rationale	Notes
The early pioneers of surfactant research included Von Neergaard, Pattle, Clements and Macklin
1929	Kurt Neergaard	Neergaard used a porcine lung to calculate pressure-volume statistics. He suggested surface tension in neonates with breathing difficulties should be investigated further.	
1947	Peter Gruenwald	Gruenwald repeated Neergaard experiments on stillborn infants and discovered "the resistance to aeration is due to surface tension which counteracts the entrance of air". He suggested the presence of pulmonary surfactant.	
1954	Charles Macklin	Macklin, a pathologist was working with phosgene in a chemical warfare laboratory when he discovered a granular substance that was discharged into the alveoli that was responsible for surface tension.	
1955	Richard Pattle	Pattle, a physicist, discovered that nerve agents caused long-lived air-bubbles in the alveoli of rabbits and posited that the absence of a lining in neonates would make breathing difficult.	
1957	John Allen Clements	Clements, a physiologist, released a report on how nerve agents damaged lungs. He went on to discover pulmonary surfactant and posited that its absence was the cause of neonatal respiratory distress syndrome (RDS).	
Mid 20th Century pulmonary surfactant research was dominated by Avery and Mead
1959	Mary Ellen Avery	Working with Jeremiah Mead showed that RDS occurred due to a deficiency of lung surfactant.	
1959	Jeremiah Mead	Together with Mary Ellen Avery, published a study that linked RDS with a deficiency of lung surfactant.	
Animal research with natural surfactants
1972	Goran Enhorning	Published a study that showed that preterm rabbits treated with a natural surfactant lived longer.	
1972	Bengt Robertson	Published a study that showed that preterm rabbits treated with a natural surfactant lived longer.	
1973	Goran Enhorning	Published a study that showed that deposition of natural surfactant into the pharynx was also effective.	
1973	Bengt Robertson	Published a study that showed that deposition of natural surfactant into the pharynx was also effective	
1978	Forest Adams	Adams and his colleagues conducted a study with a natural bovine surfactant on preterm lambs. The study showed the characteristic features of RDS were reduced by the presence of the surfactant.	
Initial clinical trials using natural surfactants
1980	Tetsurō Fujiwara	Fujiwara and his colleagues treated 10 preterm infants with a modified natural surfactant extracted from cattle lungs. Arterial oxygen tension increased in the infants within a short period. The trial clearly showed the beneficial effects from the surfactant treatment.	
1990	Bengt Robertson	Created a new surfactant Curosurf that was based on porcine lungs that had gone through an additional step of liquid gel chromatography leaving only polar lipids and SP-B and SP-C.	
1990	Tore Curstedt	Curstedt, a clinical chemist provided the necessary expertise in chemistry to synthesize Curosurf.	
Period of large randomised trials with many different surfactants
1995	Henry Halliday	Halliday conducted a review of several trials of surfactant to assess their viability.	
1997	Roger F. Soll	Between 1997 and 1999, Soll, a neonatologist, published 4 reviews in the Cochrane Library that examined different surfactant doses for RDS.	
1999	Christian Con Yost	Yost, a neonatologist and Soll, published a study on early versus delayed selective surfactant treatments for RDS.	
1999	Roger F. Soll	Yost and Soll published a study on early versus delayed selective surfactant treatments for RDS.	
2000	Roger F. Soll	Soll and Morley published a meta-analysis study of studies into prophylaxis versus selective use in preterm infants with lung disease.	
2000	Colin Morley	Morley, a paediatrician, along with Soll conducted a meta-analysis of studies in preterm infants with lung disease where the "benefits of prophylactic surfactant could no longer be demonstrated".	
2001	Roger F. Soll	In 2001, Soll and Fermin Blanco conducted a meta-analysis of studies to compare the use of natural surfactant against synthetic surfactants in preterm infants with RDS.	
2001	Fermin Blanco	Blanco, a neonatologist and Soll concluded that "natural surfactant extracts would seem to be the more desirable choice when compared to currently available synthetic surfactants".	
2002	Timothy P. Stevens	Stevens, Blennow, Soll ran a randomised clinical trial to test two treatment options for preterm infants with RDS. It compared early surfactant administration with ventilation followed by extubation to selective surfactant administration, continuous ventilation followed by extubation. The study found	
2002	Mats Blennow		
2002	Roger F. Soll	Stevens, Blennow, Soll concluded that a lower treatment threshold measured as FIO<0.45 that reduced the occurrence of air-leaks in infants with RDS.	
Period of trials to compare natural surfactants
1995	Matthias Griese	Greise and his colleagues tested several different compositions of lipid-extracted natural bovine surfactants Survanta or Alveofact to test their efficacy.	
1995	Christian P. Speer	Speer and his colleagues tested Curosurf against Survanta in neonates with RDS. Speer found Curosurf treatment resulted in a more rapid improvement in oxygenation than Survanta.	
1995	Colleen Ann Malloy	Malloy and her colleagues tested Survanta and Curosurf in neonates with RDS. The trial showed that neonates treated with Curosurf had higher FIO2 levels and reduced Patent ductus arteriosus that those neonates treated with Survanta.	
1997	Barry T. Bloom	Bloom et al. ran a trial to compare Infasurf, a surfactant prepared from calf lungs to Survanta. The trial concluded that Infasurf has a "modest" benefit in the treatment of infants with RDS over Survanta	
1999	Bart Van Overmeire	Overmeire et al. ran a trial to compare Alveofact with Survanta. Alveofact was a pulmonary surfactant prepared from SF-RI1 bovine lung lavage.	
2004	Ramanathan Rangasamy	The paediatrician Ramanathan and his colleagues ran a controlled trial where they compared Curosurf to Survanta, a bovine pulmonary surfactant with the addition of synthetic DPPC, tripalmitin and palmitic acid. The study found that Curosurf was more effective, describing Curosurf as offering "a rapid reduction in supplemental oxygen with fewer additional doses of surfactant"	
2005	Barry T. Bloom	Bloom et al., in the second and third of three studies to compare Infasurf and Survanta. Both trials were cancelled due to insufficient enrollment numbers.	
Comparison trials with a new synthetic surfactant
2005	Fernando R Moya	Moya and his colleagues compared a new synthetic surfactant Lucinactant (trade name Surfaxin) against Colfosceril palmitate (trade name Exosurf) and Survanta. Lucinactant is a synthetic surfactant with 21-amino acid peptide (leucine and lysine repeating units, KL4 peptide) that mimics Surfactant protein B added. The multi-centre trial with more than 1000 neonates in South America, found that Lucinactant significantly improved RDS at the 24 hour period compared with Colfosceril with no difference with Survanta. At 36 weeks, mortality was reduced using Lucinactant as the treatment compared to Survanta.	
2005	Sunil Kumar Sinha	Sinha his colleagues compared a new synthetic surfactant Lucinactant with Curosurf. This trial involving 252 neonates found that each were similar in terms of their effect and safety when treating neonates with RDS. However this South American trial had to be stopped after it was extended to 24 months due to lack of candidates being recruited.	
Science of synthetic surfactants
2006	Tore Curstedt	Curstedt and Johansson of the Karolinska Institute reviewed several newer synthetic surfactants and came to the conclusion that KL4 acetate peptide mimics SP-C as it "forms a transmembrane alpha helix" rather than SP-B, which is essential for surfactant function.	
2006	Janne Johansson		
2007	Frans J. Walther	In this trial, Walther and his colleagues conducted a review of recent research developments with peptide analogues of SP-B and SP-C.	
2009	Frans J. Walther	Walther and his colleagues tried to identify the most efficacious composition of SP-B (1–25), a synthetic peptide, potentially useful in a synthetic surfactant. They compared the compositions in natural lung lavage (NL) as against synthetic lung lavage (SL) and a standard lipid mixtures (LM). Calfactant and a peptide free lipid composition was used as the control. In the study that used rats, it found that lung volume was greater when treated with Calfactant and SP-B (1–25) in NL and SL mixtures compared to a similar composition using LM.	
Development of different administration methods
1991	Roderic H. Phibbs	Phibbs and his colleagues tested the synthetic surfactant, Colfosceril palmitate, trade name Exosurf that was administed via rapid installation intratracheally in neonates with RDS in two trials. The study found that in the treated group, 36% of neonates either had a relapse or incomplete response. In the group that were treated, survival increased significantly.	
1991	Walker Long	Long and his colleagues tested the efficacy of Exosurf in a multicenter trial across 21 hospitals with 419 preterm infants with RDS. The group treated the rescue group with a slow instillation through a side port adapter attached to the endotracheal tube and the other group with a placebo. Two doses were given, the first between 2 and 24 hours, the second 12 hours later. The study found that the synthetic surfactant improved survival rates amongst infants with RDS.	
1998	Adolf Valls-i-Soler	Valls-i-Soler and his colleagues used dual-lumen endotracheal tube to instil Curosurf for 1 minute in infants with RDS without withdrawing mechanical ventilation, in a trial with 198 infants. The trial found that the use of the treatment reduced hypoxia.	
1999	Henrik Verder	Verder and his colleagues in a trial with a cohort of 60 neonates with RDS within a group 397 neonates underwent early treatment with Corusurf and nasal CPAP found the treatment significantly improves oxygen levels and reduces the need for mechanical ventilation. 68% of the group who were treated late with Corusurf needed ventilation compared to 25% with early treatment.	
2000	E. Berggren	Berggren and colleagues tested an Aiolos® nebulizer to administer Curosurf to 34 infants with RDS to determine if aerosolisation of surfactant was an effective treatment. The trial found no beneficial effects of aerosolised surfactant.	
2004	John Kattwinkel	Kattwinkel and his colleagues ran a trial to test the effects of applying surfactant into the nasopharynx of the baby during delivery. In a trial of 23 premature babies had Infasurf instilled into the nasopharynx while being delivered at shoulder level. The treatment was found to safe and simple to administer. The trial was too small to determine the efficacy of the treatment.	
