= Pulmonary surfactant (medication) =

Medication

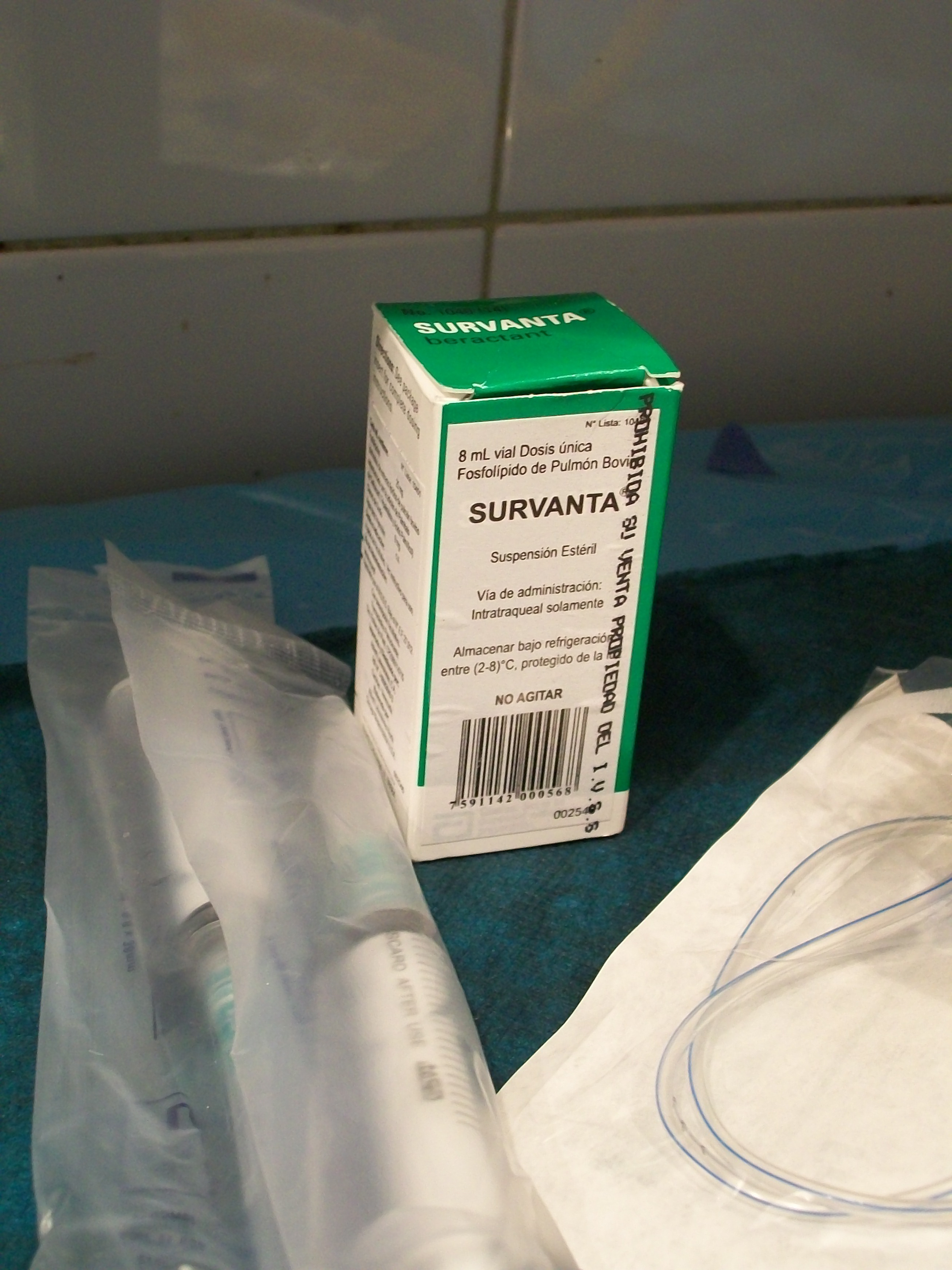
- Carton of beractant (Survanta), surrounded by devices for its application.

Clinical data
- Pronunciation: Curosurf, Survanta, others
- Other names: Beractant, Poractant alfa, others
- AHFS/Drugs.com: Monograph
- License data: US DailyMed: Poractant_alfa
- ATC code: R07AA (WHO)

Identifiers
- CAS Number: 129069-19-8
- ChemSpider: none
- UNII: KE3U2023NP

Pulmonary surfactant is used as a medication to treat and prevent respiratory distress syndrome in newborn babies.

Prevention is generally done in babies born at a gestational age of less than 32 weeks. It is given by the endotracheal tube. Onset of effects is rapid. A number of doses may be needed.

Side effects may include slow heart rate and low oxygen levels. Its use is also linked with intracranial bleeding. Pulmonary surfactant may be isolated from the lungs of cows or pigs or made artificially.

Pulmonary surfactant was discovered in the 1950s and a manufactured version was approved for medical use in the United States in 1990. It is on the World Health Organization's List of Essential Medicines.

== Medical uses ==
Pulmonary surfactant is used to treat and prevent respiratory distress syndrome in newborn babies. Prevention is generally done in babies born less than 32 weeks gestational age. Tentative evidence supports use in drowning.

Surfactant administration can also be effective in meconium aspiration syndrome where it has been shown to help lower length of stay.

== Types ==
There are a number of types of pulmonary surfactants available. Like their natural counterparts, pulmonary surfactant preparations consist of phospholipids (mainly DPPC) combined with spreading agents such as SP-B and SP-C. Ex-situ measurements of surface tension and interfacial rheology can help to understand the functionality of pulmonary surfactants.

Synthetic pulmonary surfactants:

- Colfosceril palmitate (Exosurf) – a mixture of DPPC with hexadecanol and tyloxapol added as spreading agents
- Pumactant (Artificial Lung Expanding Compound or ALEC) – a mixture of DPPC and PG
- Lucinactant (KL4, trade name Surfaxin) – composed of DPPC, palmitoyl-oleoyl phosphatidylglycerol, and palmitic acid, combined with a 21 amino acid synthetic peptide (sinapultide) that mimics the C-terminal helical domain of SP-B.
- Ventricute - DPPC, rSP-C

Animal-derived surfactants:

- Beractant (Survanta) – extracted from minced cow lung with additional DPPC, palmitic acid and tripalmitin, manufactured by Abbvie
  - (Beraksurf) – extracted from minced cow lung with additional DPPC, palmitic acid and tripalmitin, manufactured by Tekzima
- Calfactant (Infasurf) – extracted from calf lung lavage fluid, manufactured by ONY Biotech.
- Poractant alfa (Curosurf) – extracted from material derived from minced pig lung
- Surfactant TA (Surfacten) – derived from cows, manufactured by Tokyo Tanabe Co.
- Bovactant SF-RI (Alveofact) – extracted from cow lung lavage fluid, manufactured by Boehringer Ingelheim

== History ==
Researcher John Clements identified surfactants and their role in the 1950s. Mary Ellen Avery soon after showed that the lungs of premature infants could not produce surfactants.

The first artificial pulmonary surfactant for neonates was developed by Japanese pediatrician Tetsurō Fujiwara in 1979.

Exosurf, Curosurf, Infasurf, and Survanta were the initial surfactants approved for use in the US.

In 2012, the US Food and Drug Administration approved an additional synthetic surfactant, lucinactant (Surfaxin).

== Research ==
Surfactant may be beneficial in those with COVID-19 associated acute respiratory distress syndrome.
