= Henry Halliday =

British neonatologist (1945–2022)

- Halliday at his acceptance of the James Spence Medal
- Born: 29 November 1945; Belfast
- Died: 12 November 2022 (aged 76); Belfast
- Education: Queen's University Belfast, Rainbow Babies & Children's Hospital, Cleveland, University of California, San Francisco
- Known for: Developing a pulmonary surfactant that enabled very small babies to breathe properly
- Scientific career
- Fields: Pediatrics, neonatology
- Workplaces: Royal Jubilee Maternity Hospital, Mater Infirmorum Hospital, Queen's University Belfast

Henry Lewis Halliday (29 November 1945 – 12 November 2022) was a British-Irish paediatrician and neonatologist. In 2021, Halliday was awarded the James Spence Medal for research into neonatology, for coordinating two of the largest neonatal multicentre trials for prevention and treatment of a number of neonatal respiratory illnesses and for a breakthrough in the development of a new lung surfactant that brought relief to very small babies suffering from infant respiratory distress syndrome (RDS).

== Life ==
Halliday was one of four siblings, the eldest of four brothers. His father Louis Halliday was an accountant, while his mother Gladys was a shopkeeper. Halliday attended school at the Belfast Royal Academy before deciding to study medicine. He matriculated in 1965 at Queen's University Belfast medical school and graduated in 1970.

In 1977, Halliday married Marjorie Dalziel who was an intensive care nurse. The couple had three children, Joy, Gail & Brian Joshua, all of whom became doctors.

== Career ==
Halliday decided to pursue a career in paediatrics with a specialism in neonatal medicine. After his postgraduate training in Belfast, he moved to the United States where he spent three years, first working at the Rainbow Babies & Children's Hospital in Cleveland and later at the Cardiovascular Research Institute, University of California in San Francisco. In San Francisco, Halliday met the influential John Allen Clements, a specialist in pulmonary surfactant who stimulated his interest in surfactant research and pulmonology.

Upon returning to Belfast in 1979 he was appointed to the Royal Maternity Hospital as second consultant neonatologist. At the Royal Maternity, Halliday worked to develop a new neonatal unit and to expand neonatal care across the whole of Northern Ireland. While there, he worked with the paediatrician's Garth McClure and Mark Reid along with the obstetrician, Knox Ritchie. In 1980, he passed the MD Thesis at Queens University with a paper on the role of left to right shunting through a patent ductus arteriosus.

== Surfactant development ==
In 1984, Halliday held a randomised, controlled trial of an artificial surfactant known as the "Belfast surfactant" to test how effective it was on pre-term infants, for the treatment of RDS. The trial was largely a disappointment as he realised his artificial surfactant wasn't a good substitute for the natural surfactant.

Halliday's product was a synthetic lung surfactant called Turfsurf and was a mixture of Dipalmitoylphosphatidylcholine and high-density lipoproteins in a ratio of 10:1. However, the surfactant was never developed into a commercial product as the trial was disappointing. In the same year, Halliday met Colin J Morley who had developed a synthetic lung surfactant known as "ALEC" with Alec Bangham. Morley analysed Halliday's results in a sub-group of infants of 25–29 weeks’ gestation in four trials and showed how that surfactant treated infants had lower death rates than if treated normally. As the control group was insufficiently large, Morley suggested to Halliday that he make contact with the Swedish physician Bengt Robertson who had also developed a surfactant Poractant alfa known under the trade name Curosurf. Robertson and his colleague Tore Curstedt had created Curosurf from pig lungs instead of cow lungs. Halliday spent a month with Robertson at the Karolinska University Hospital in Stockholm in November 1984, when they ran a 27 day pre-clinical trial both In vitro and in rabbit fetus's ventilated with a plethysmograph where Turfsurf was compared to Curosurf. Curosurf was found to be superior. Halliday witnessed the highly efficacious Corusurf at work when pre-term twins were treated, who were going blue in the face due to a lack of oxygen and almost immediately after treatment, turned a healthy pink.

The success of the 27-day experiment spurred Halliday and Robertson to create the first international clinical trial for Corusurf. They selected a randomised group of preterm infants of around 10 hours old who were suffering from severe RDS who were given a single dose of Corosurf at 200 mg/kg. A control group was created that were subject to mechanical ventilation. Corosurf was found to reduce pulmonary air leaks and neonatal mortality in preterm infants. Halliday created further international clinical trials that led from single dose treatments that reduced mortality in the early 1980s from 50% to about 10% with multiple doses in the 1990s. In 1992, Halliday published the results of a large Randomized European Multicentre trial that he coordinated and led that concluded that treatment with multiple doses of Curosurf surfactant is more effective than single-dose treatment in severe neonatal respiratory distress syndrome that further reduced pneumothorax death.

== Use of postnatal steroids ==
Halliday's other area of interest was in the use of postnatal steroids (inhaled and systemic) to prevent chronic lung disease. In 2000, Halliday coordinated a large multicentre, randomized clinical trial of early corticosteroid treatment, known as OSSECT to compare whether there was any difference in early (<3 days) with late (>15 days) steroid therapy and dexamethasone with inhaled budesonide treatment in preterm infants at risk of developing chronic lung disease. The study found no difference. He also conducted research on the pathogenesis of CLD and inflammation, as well as iron metabolism in the foetus and neonate and long term follow-up of survivors of CLD.

== Publishing ==
In 2004, Halliday along with his colleague, the German paediatrician Christian P. Speer co-founded the journal "Biology of the Neonate" now known as Neonatology.

== Societies ==
In 1992 he was appointed Honorary Professor in the Department of Child Health at Queen's University. In 1997 he appointed President of the European Society for Paediatric Research. In 2006 Halliday was appointed to the position of president of the European Association of Perinatal Medicine.

== Awards and honours ==
In 2010 Halliday was awarded the Maternité Prize from the European Society of Perinatal Medicine for his advocacy in international medical politics that led to structural reform. In 2021, Halliday was awarded the James Spence Medal by the British Paediatric Association for outstanding contributions to paediatric knowledge, Halliday was the first Northern Ireland physician to be awarded the medal.

== See also ==
- Pioneers of surfactant research

== Bibliography ==
- Halliday, Henry L. (2005). "History of Surfactant from 1980". Neonatology. 87 (4): 317–322. doi:10.1159/000084879. PMID 15985754.
- Halliday, Henry L.; McClure, Garth; Reid, Mark; Bell, Angela; Tubman, Richard (1998). Handbook of neonatal intensive care (4th ed.). London: W.B. Saunders. ISBN 9780702017728.
- HAPO Study Cooperative Research Group (1 February 2009). "Hyperglycemia and Adverse Pregnancy Outcome (HAPO) Study: Associations With Neonatal Anthropometrics". Diabetes. 58 (2). American Diabetes Association: 453–459. doi:10.2337/db08-1112. PMC 2628620. PMID 19011170.
