= List of medical inhalants =

A list of drugs or therapeutic agents administered via inhalation.

== Inhalational anesthetic agents ==
- aliflurane
- desflurane
- isoflurane
- methoxyflurane
- methoxypropane
- nitrous oxide
- roflurane
- sevoflurane
- teflurane
- trichloroethylene
- vinyl ether
- xenon

== Bronchodilators ==
- Arformoterol
- Bitolterol
- Epinephrine
- Fenoterol
- Formoterol
- Ipratropium
- Isoetharine
- Isoproterenol
- Levalbuterol
- Metaproterenol
- Pirbuterol
- Procaterol
- Racepinephrine (racemic epinephrine)
- Salbutamol
- Salmeterol
- Terbutaline
- Tiotropium

== Anti-hypertensives ==
- Amyl nitrite
- Iloprost (Prostacyclin)
- Nitric oxide

== Anti-inflammatories ==
- Beclomethasone
- Budesonide
- Ciclesonide
- Cromolyn
- Dexamethasone
- Flunisolide
- Fluticasone
- Mometasone
- Nedocromil
- Triamcinolone

== Antimicrobials ==
- Pentamidine
- Ribavirin
- Tobramycin
- Zanamivir

== Pulmonary surfactants ==
- Beractant
- Calfactant
- Colfosceril
- Poractant alfa

== Sympathomimetic amines ==
- Amphetamine (Benzedrine)
- Levomethamphetamine (Vicks Vapor Inhaler)
- Propylhexedrine (Benzedrex)

== Miscellaneous ==
- Aromatic ammonia
- Dornase alfa
- Glutathione
- Insulin
- Methacholine
- Nicotine
- Sodium chloride

== Historical ==
=== Inhalational anesthetic agents ===
- halothane
- cyclopropane
- chloroform
- chloroethane
- diethyl ether

== See also ==
- Inhalant – non-medical drugs administered via inhalation
