= Bengt Robertson =

Swedish physician

Bengt A. Robertson
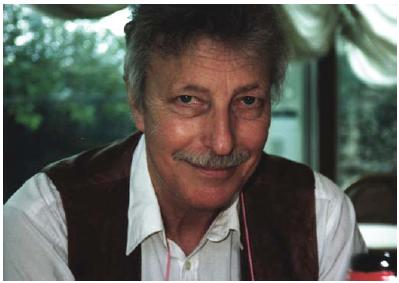
- Born: 14 September 1935; Stockholm, Sweden
- Died: 7 December 2008 (aged 73)
- Education: Karolinska Institute
- Known for: Corusurf
- Scientific career
- Thesis: The intrapulmonary arterial pattern in normal infancy and in transposition of the great arteries (1968)

Bengt A. Robertson was a Swedish physician and perinatal pathologist. Robertson was primarily known for the development of the synthetic lung surfactant Corusurf which provided relief to very small babies suffering from infant respiratory distress syndrome (RDS). From 1974 to 2000, he was the director of the division for experimental perinatal pathology in the department of women and child Health at the Karolinska Institute.

In 1996, he was awarded the King Faisal International Prize in Medicine together with Tetsurō Fujiwara for contributions to the understanding of neonatal medicine.

== Life ==
Robertson was born and grew up in Stockholm. As a child, he attended the Södra Latins Gymnasium in the Södermalm area of Stockholm, leaving in 1953. Having decided to become a physician, Robertson attended the Karolinska Institute, a medical university and graduated Master of Science in Medicine (Swedish: Läkarexamen) in 1960. Robertson followed the MD with a Doctor of Philosophy degree and was awarded a doctorate in 1968. His thesis was titled: "The intrapulmonary arterial pattern in normal infancy and in transposition of the great arteries".

Robertson was married to Gertie Grossmann, a pediatric surgeon who collaborated with him on surfactant research. Bengt had four children from a previous marriage, consisting of one daughter and three sons.

== Career ==
From 1974 to 2000, he was director of the department of Experimental Perinatal Pathology at the Karolinska Institute. In 1976, he was appointed as visiting professor at the University of Toronto. This was followed by two visiting scholar positions to the University of Perugia in 1985 and 1987. From 1994 to 1997, Robertson was also director of the department of pediatric pathology at Karolinska University Hospital. In 2000, Robertson was promoted to an adjunct professor in Perinatal Pathology at the Karolinska Institute.

=== Surfactant research ===
In 1959, Mary Avery and Jere Mede conducted a trial at the department of physiology at Harvard University in Boston, that showed that respiratory distress syndrome (RDS) was due to surfactant deficiency. Two trials followed that used synthetic Dipalmitoylphosphatidylcholine surfactant. The surfactant treatment was delivered as a mist via a nebulizer but the trials showed mixed results. Robillard stated it seemed worthy of further investigation. The second study by Jacqueline Chu and her colleagues John Clements, Marshall Klaus and Bill Tooley in Singapore, implied that the underlying cause of RDS was low blood flow instead of a deficiency of surfactant.

In the late 1960s, Bengt started to collaborate with English-Swedish obstetrician Goran Enhörning (1924-2013) at the Karolinska Institute. Enhörning had been researching RDS in the 1960s and had developed a number of clinical surfactants and therapies to treat RDS. Together, Bengt and Enhörning conducted two trials to discover the reasons for the failure of nebulised synthetic surfactant. They described that when natural surfactant was installed directly into the trachea of premature rabbits, normal lung expansion was achieved, and the animals survived. The discovery that the treatment effect was dependent on the surfactant preparation containing natural surfactant proteins and that the surfactant was administered as a bolus dose directly into the trachea; i.e., to be effective the treatment needed to be nebulised directly into the lungs of preterm infants, which resulted in the enhanced expansion of the lungs by air. During the same period, they were joined by Gertie Grossmann, a pediatric surgeon based at the institute. The group worked together during the early 1970s until Enhörning left for an appointment at the University of Toronto in 1971. Bengt and Grossmann continuing their collaboration into the 1980s. The group used a primate model to test the effects of surfactant on the lung function and morphology that had been developed in Toronto. In the first trial in 1978, a surfactant obtained from the lungs of rabbits was tested on a group of 12 rhesus monkeys with 6 monkeys in the control group. The trial proved that a natural surfactant "held promise" as a treatment for RDS.

=== Curosurf ===
In the 1980's, Robertson and Tore Curstedt, a clinical chemist created a new surfactant Curosurf that was based on porcine lungs that had gone through an additional step of liquid gel chromatography leaving only polar lipids and surfactant proteins SP-B and SP-C. In 1983, Robertson was asked by a colleague Rolf Zetterström to help a little girl with RDS. The young child went from suffering cyanosis to turning a rosy colour, indicating successful treatment. In November 1984, Robertson was visited by Henry Halliday. Together they conducted a pre-clinical trial both In vitro and in rabbit fetus's ventilated with a plethysmograph, comparing Hallidays artificial surfactant Turfsurf with Curosurf which was found to be superior. Halliday witnessed the highly efficacious Corusurf at work when pre-term twins were treated, who were going blue in the face due to a lack of oxygen and almost immediately after treatment, turned a healthy pink.

=== Testing Curosurf ===
In the autumn of 1984, Bengt became the leader of a group of neonatologist and surfactant researchers, known as "The Collaborative European Multicenter Study Group", colloquially known as "the Curosurf family", who were formed to test Curosurf in the first large international multicentre clinical trial. In 1988, the study group reported that Curosurf reduced pulmonary air leaks and improved lung function in neonates with RDS. Over the next decade, Robertson coordinated the study groups to produce a series of trials to test Curosurf. The first two defined treatment regimens, This was followed by trials to define when optimal treatment should be undertaken. In the following years further trials were held to test Curosurf in combination with continuous positive airway pressure treatment.

== Honours ==
Robertson received many honours throughout his life. In 1996, he was first recognised when he was awarded the King Faisal International Prize. Two years later in 1998, Robertson along with Tore Curstedt was awarded the Hilda and Alfred Eriksson Prize by the Royal Swedish Academy of Sciences. In 2002, he was awarded the Erich Saling Maternité Prize given by the European Association of Perinatal Medicine. This was followed in 2004 with the awarding of the Lars Werkö Prize by the Swedish Heart Lung Foundation along with Tore Curstedt.

=== Societies ===
Robertson was also awarded a number of honorary positions throughout his life:

- In 1987 Honorary Membership of the Italian Society of Perinatal Medicine
- In 1996, Fellowship of the Royal College of Physicians of Edinburgh

== Publications ==
- Robertson, Bengt (1968). The intrapulmonary arterial pattern in normal infancy and in transposition of the great arteries The intrapulmonary arterial pattern in normal infancy and in transposition of the great arteries. Stockholm: Almqvist & Wiksell bokhandel. OCLC 15600.
- Robertson, Bengt (1973). Microangiography of the lung in infancy and childhood. Stockholm : [Solna]: Proprius; [Seelig]. ISBN 9789171181633. OCLC 841508.
- Robertson, Bengt; van Golde, Lambert M. G.; Batenburg, J. J. (1992). Pulmonary surfactant: from molecular biology to clinical practice. Amsterdam: Elsevier. ISBN 9780444894755.
- Robertson, Bengt; Taeusch, H. William (1995). Surfactant therapy for lung disease. New York: Dekker. ISBN 9780824795023.
