= C40H80NO8P =

The molecular formula C_{40}H_{80}NO_{8}P (molar mass: 734.03 g/mol) may refer to:

- Colfosceril palmitate
- Dipalmitoylphosphatidylcholine (DPPC)
