= Lucinactant =

Clinical data
- Trade names: Surfaxin
- ATC code: R07AA30 (WHO)

Identifiers
- CAS Number: 825600-90-6
- UNII: 5BSH2G9BH8

Lucinactant (trade name Surfaxin) is a liquid medication used to treat infant respiratory distress syndrome. It is a pulmonary surfactant for infants who lack enough natural surfactant in their lungs. Whereas earlier medicines of the class, such as beractant (Survanta & Beraksurf), calfactant (Infasurf), and poractant (Curosurf), are derived from animals, lucinactant is synthetic. It was approved for use in the United States by the U.S. Food and Drug Administration (FDA) on March 6, 2012.

== Medical uses ==
Lucinactant is indicated to improve lung function and reduce duration and risk of mechanical ventilation in children. It can be used up to two years of age and is specified for children who are diagnosed with acute respiratory failure following exposure to a pathogen such as RSV or influenza, including H1N1. Lucinactant is also used to treat meconium aspiration syndrome.

== Chemistry ==
Lucinactant contains the peptide sinapultide (KL4 acetate, KLLLLKLLLLKLLLLKLLLLK), dipalmitoylphosphatidylcholine (DPPC), 1-palmitoyl-2-oleoyl-sn-glycero-3-phosphoglycerol (POPG) (as the sodium salt), and palmitic acid. Specifically 2.7% KL4, DPPC/POPG at a ratio of 3:1 and 13.5% of palmitic acid.

== History ==
The scientific groundwork for lucinactant was laid in the laboratory of Charles Cochrane at The Scripps Research Institute in the 1990s. The drug was then developed by Discovery Laboratories of Warrington, PA. The path through the approval process was unusually long, reflecting in part challenges in the manufacturing process that needed to be addressed before approval was granted.

== Legal status ==
Lucinactant is listed as an Orphan Drug Product by the US Food and Drug Administration for several conditions:

- 07-30-1996 Treatment of meconium aspiration syndrome in newborn infants
- 07-17-1995 Treatment of acute respiratory distress syndrome in adults.
- 05-23-2006 Prevention of bronchopulmonary dysplasia in premature infants
- 10-21-2005 Treatment of bronchopulmonary dysplasia in premature infants.
- 10-18-1995 Treatment of respiratory distress syndrome in premature infants.

Clinical trials in Latin America were criticized for protocol based in potentially unethical principles. A placebo was used and considered ethical by design since infants born in Latin America usually do not have access to life saving treatment. The intent of Discovery Labs was always to market Surfaxin in the United States, implying burdens on the Latin American children that outweighed the benefits.
