= DPPC =

DPPC can stand for:

- Disabled Persons Protection Commission at the Commonwealth of Massachusetts
- Dipalmitoylphosphatidylcholine, a phospholipid
- Disaster Prevention and Preparedness Commission of Ethiopia
- Data Privacy & Protection Counsel
