= Granulocyte-macrophage colony-stimulating factor receptor =

Protein-coding gene in humans

CSF2RA

Identifiers
- Aliases: CSF2RA, CD116, CDw116, CSF2R, CSF2RAX, CSF2RAY, CSF2RX, CSF2RY, GM-CSF-R-alpha, GMCSFR, GMR, SMDP4, colony stimulating factor 2 receptor alpha subunit, alphaGMR, colony stimulating factor 2 receptor subunit alpha, GMR-alpha, GMCSFR-alpha, granulocyte-macrophage colony-stimulating factor receptor
- External IDs: OMIM: 425000, 306250; MGI: 1339754; GeneCards: CSF2RA
Available structures
PDB	Ortholog search: PDBe RCSB
PDB	List of PDB id codes 4NKQ, 4RS1

Gene location (Human)
Chr.	X chromosome (human)
Band	X;Y	Start	1,268,800 bp
Band	X;Y	End	1,310,381 bp

Gene location (Mouse)
Chr.	Chromosome 19 (mouse)
Band	19 D3|19 56.89 cM	Start	61,223,957 bp
Band	19 D3|19 56.89 cM	End	61,228,429 bp
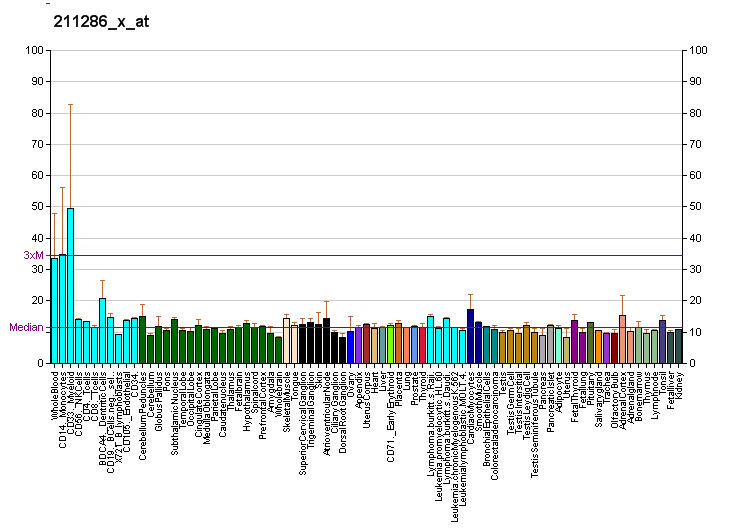

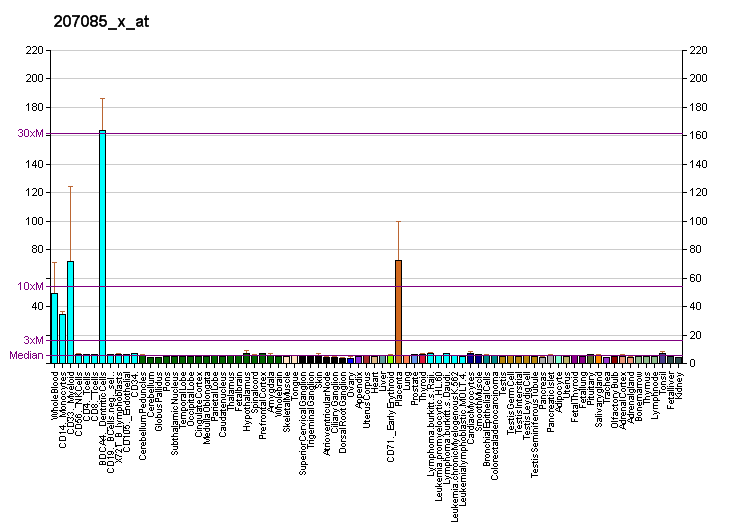

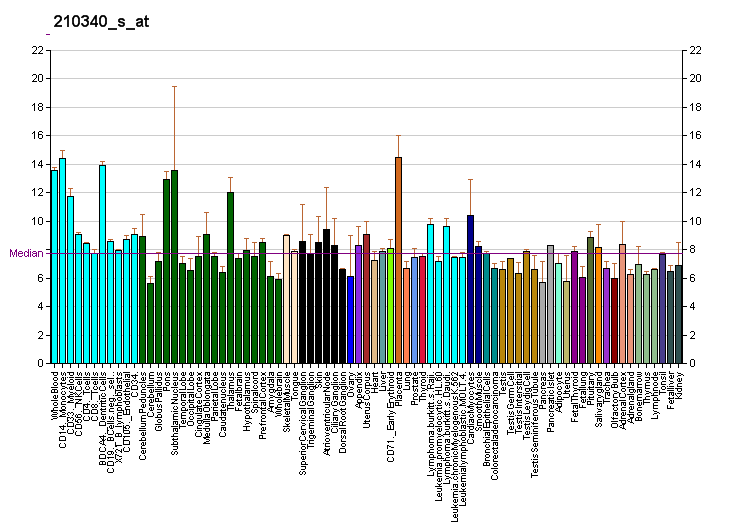
RNA expression pattern
Bgee	Human / Mouse (ortholog); Top expressed in: monocyte; blood; granulocyte; placenta; sural nerve; right lung; testicle; upper lobe of left lung; C1 segment; appendix / Top expressed in: granulocyte; tibiofemoral joint; stroma of bone marrow; neural layer of retina; genital tubercle; superior frontal gyrus; blood; subcutaneous adipose tissue; primary visual cortex; spleen; More reference expression data
BioGPS	More reference expression data
Gene ontology
Molecular function	protein binding; cytokine receptor activity; protein tyrosine kinase activity; signaling receptor activity; cytokine binding
Cellular component	integral component of membrane; membrane; plasma membrane; integral component of plasma membrane; extracellular region; intracellular anatomical structure; external side of plasma membrane; receptor complex
Biological process	MAPK cascade; peptidyl-tyrosine phosphorylation; cytokine-mediated signaling pathway
Sources:Amigo / QuickGO
Orthologs
Databases	NCBI: entry; OMA: entry
Species	Human	Mouse
Entrez	1438	12982
Ensembl	ENSG00000198223	ENSMUSG00000059326
UniProt	P15509	Q00941
RefSeq (mRNA)	NM_001161529; NM_001161530; NM_001161531; NM_001161532; NM_006140 NM_172245; NM_172246; NM_172247; NM_172248; NM_172249; NM_001379153; NM_001379154; NM_001379155; NM_001379156; NM_001379158; NM_001379159; NM_001379160; NM_001379161; NM_001379162; NM_001379163; NM_001379164; NM_001379165; NM_001379166; NM_001379167; NM_001379168; NM_001379169	NM_009970
RefSeq (protein)	NP_001155001; NP_001155002; NP_001155003; NP_001155004; NP_006131 NP_758448; NP_758449; NP_758450; NP_758452; NP_001366082; NP_001366083; NP_001366084; NP_001366085; NP_001366087; NP_001366088; NP_001366089; NP_001366090; NP_001366091; NP_001366092; NP_001366093; NP_001366094; NP_001366095; NP_001366096; NP_001366097; NP_001366098	NP_034100
Location (UCSC)	Chr X: 1.27 – 1.31 Mb	Chr 19: 61.22 – 61.23 Mb
PubMed search
- Wikidata
View/Edit Human	View/Edit Mouse

The granulocyte-macrophage colony-stimulating factor receptor, also known as CD116 (Cluster of Differentiation 116), is a receptor for granulocyte-macrophage colony-stimulating factor, which stimulates the production of white blood cells. In contrast to M-CSF and G-CSF which are lineage specific, GM-CSF and its receptor play a role in earlier stages of development. The receptor is primarily located on neutrophils, eosinophils and monocytes/macrophages, it is also on CD34+ progenitor cells (myeloblasts) and precursors for erythroid and megakaryocytic lineages, but only in the beginning of their development.

It is associated with Surfactant metabolism dysfunction type 4.

== Structure ==
The granulocyte-macrophage colony-stimulating factor receptor is a heterodimer composed of at least two different subunits; an α chain, and a β chain which is also present in the receptors for IL-3 and IL-5. The α subunit contains a binding site for granulocyte macrophage colony-stimulating factor, but associates with the ligand only with low affinity. The β chain is involved in signal transduction and formation of high affinity receptor complex together with α chain. Furthermore, association of the α and β subunits results in receptor activation.

=== α chain ===
Gene for α chain is in pseudoautosomal region (PAR) of X and Y chromosomes at the very tip of the chromosomes, near telomere regions and also genes encoding IL-3α with which they share some similarities. Along the gene are several transcription regulatory binding sites with common binding motifs for such transcription factors as GATA, C/EBP or NF-κB.

α chain is 80kDa type I transmembrane protein composed of 3 domains: extracellular, transmembrane and cytoplasmic. Mature polypeptide contains 378 amino acids - 298 amino acids in extracellular domain, 26 in transmembrane domain, 54 in short cytoplasmic tail, plus 22 amino acid long signal peptide, which is cleaved off during translation. Extracellular domain contains cytokine receptor domain for binding its cognate ligand with conserved cysteine residues, WSXWS motif and 11 potential N-glycosylation sites for oligosaccharides, which are important for ligand binding and signalling. Cytoplasmic domain is made of short proline-rich motif and has no intrinsic enzymatic activity. Similar to such motif is also Box1 sequence in β chain.

=== β chain ===
β chain is crucial for enhancement of binding affinity to the ligand and transduces signal of the activated receptor complex. It is shared with other cytokine receptors IL-3 and IL-5. Its location is on chromosome 22. Surrounding sequences provide binding sites for several regulatory transcription factors similar to those for α chain (GATA, C/EBP, NF-κB). β subunit forms mature 95kDa 800 amino acid long polypeptide with 3 domains: extracellular, transmembrane and cytoplasmic. Extracellular domain contains haematopoietin domains, also known as cytokine receptor modules, which can be found in other cytokine receptors (growth hormone receptor, erythropoietin receptor). In the membrane distant part are typically cysteine residues forming disulphide bonds, proline pair, which devies the extracellular domain into two fibronectin type III-like subdomains in seven stranded β-barrel structure. In the membrane proximal region is then a WSXWS motif as is in α chain. Cytoplasmic domain serves as a signal transducer.

=== Structural variants ===
α chain can be modified in post-transcriptional manner by alternative splicing creating different variant of mRNA. Splicing on 3´end produces transcript where 25 amino acids in C-terminal region are completely replaced by 35 new amino acids. Such protein is functional, but 10 times less abundant. Another splicing variant lacks both transmembrane and cytoplasmic domains. Remaining extracellular domain acts as a soluble GM-CSFRα and have been identified in bone marrow, monocytes and macrophages, placenta and chorio-carcinoma cells. Splicing products on the 5´end were found in primary haematopoietic cells and acute myeloid leukemia blasts.

β subunit can be found in two distinct isoforms: classical full-length protein and alternative form with deletions in transmembrane domain. Deletions results in truncated peptide with 23 original amino acids in the membrane proximal cytoplasmic region and 23 new ones in C-terminal tail. This shorter isoform is unable to transduce any signals, thus acts as a negative inhibitor. Significantly upregulated production is in blasts from acute myeloid leukemia patients.

== Signal transduction ==
Upon dimerisation of the α and β subunits the β subunit becomes phosphorylated on tyrosine residues in its cytoplasmic domain, where are many regions participating in different cell signalling mechanisms for proliferation, differentiation and survival. Formation of high affinity receptor complex includes specific interactions between both subunits and ligand. Interactions then mediate conformational changes and subsequent receptor activation. Receptor is either functional in single heterodimer α1β1 or in dimerised complexes α2β2 joined by intermolecular disulphide bonds. For full activation oligomerization of the receptor is crucial, it is formed into hexamer composed of two GM-CSF, two α and two β subunits or dodecamer which is composed of two hexamers.

Phosphorylation is mediated by tyrosine kinases, members of the Janus kinase (JAK) family, which are constitutively associated with cytoplasmic domain. Activated kinases then phosphorylate tyrosine residues on cytoplasmic domain of β subunit, thus creating docking sites for Src homology 2 (SH2) domain-containing signalling proteins like Shc and STATs. These interactions trigger downstream signalling pathways, depending on the location of phosphorylated tyrosine residues in the chain. Membrane proximal section is known to be responsible for proliferation by activating STAT5 and c-myc. Membrane distal section is then required for differentiation and survival by prevention of apoptosis and activation of MAPK and PI3K pathways.

=== Downregulation of signal transduction ===
Simultaneously with receptor activation goes hand in hand its downregulation, that prevents unwanted overactivation. Controlling mechanisms are mainly aimed at inhibition of JAK kinase activity by SHP-1 tyrosine phosphatase with SH2 binding domain or by members of SOCS family which also possess SH2 domain. After direct ligation with JAK kinase, they mediate degradation in proteasome. Other possibility of downregulation is degradation of phosphorylated β subunit and subsequent internalization of the receptor/ligand complex. Rate of such process positively correlates with amount of ligand/receptor complexes. In addition, after stimulation of β subunit mRNA levels coding α chain decrease and on the contrary expression of soluble α subunit is upregulated. Soluble GM-CSFRα then clutches free ligands with similar affinity as membrane receptor and prevents binding of GM-CSF to the cell surface. GM-CSFRα can be also cleaved off of the membrane receptor.

== Role in development ==
Different expression of GM-CSFR subunits on hematopoietic cells mediates maturation of various lineages. For example, in quiescent hematopoietic stem cells the β chain is expressed at very low levels and the amount increases along initial differentiation of erythroid, megakaryocytic, granulocytic and monocytic lineages. In the first two mentioned lineages the expression eventually vanishes completely, in granulocytes and monocytes persists and continues to grow during their differentiation. In monocytes and mainly neutrophils receptor regulates proliferation, maturation and overall survival.

Kinetics of the receptor in immature and mature myeloid cells in response to GM-CSF is readily regulated by internalization or just by above mentioned degradation and desensitization of β subunit (mainly in the earlier hematopoietic development).

== Role in malaria pathogenesis ==
It was shown that defective dendritic cell (DC) differentiation in malaria at least partially caused by GM-CSFR dysregulation and GM-CSFR modification by lipoperoxidation product 4-HNE via direct interaction with its CD116 subunit.
