= Interfacial rheology =

Study of flow of matter at interfaces

Interfacial rheology is a branch of rheology that studies the flow of matter at the interface between a gas and a liquid or at the interface between two immiscible liquids. The measurement is done while having surfactants, nanoparticles or other surface active compounds present at the interface. Unlike in bulk rheology, the deformation of the bulk phase is not of interest in interfacial rheology and its effect is aimed to be minimized. Instead, the flow of the surface active compounds is of interest.

The deformation of the interface can be done either by changing the size or shape of the interface. Therefore interfacial rheological methods can be divided into two categories: dilational and shear rheology methods.

== Interfacial dilational rheology ==
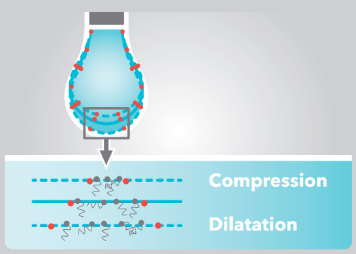
Pulsating drop method for dilatational interfacial rheology

In dilatational interfacial rheology, the size of the interface is changing over time. The change in the surface stress or surface tension of the interface is being measured during this deformation. Based on the response, interfacial viscoelasticity is calculated according to well established theories:

$\left\vert E \right\vert = {d\gamma \over d\ln\!A}=A{d\gamma \over dA}$

$$\begin{align} E' & = \left\vert E \right\vert\cos\delta  \end{align}$$

$$\begin{align} E'' & = \left\vert E \right\vert\sin\delta  \end{align}$$

where

- |E| is the complex surface dilatational modulus
- γ is the surface tension or interfacial tension of the interface
- A is the interfacial area
- δ is the phase angle difference between the surface tension and area
- E’' is the elastic (storage) modulus
- E’'' is the viscous (loss) modulus

Most commonly, the measurement of dilational interfacial rheology is conducted with an optical tensiometer combined to a pulsating drop module. A pendant droplet with surface active molecules in it is formed and pulsated sinusoidally. The changes in the interfacial area causes changes in the molecular interactions which then changes the surface tension. Typical measurements include performing a frequency sweep for the solution to study the kinetics of the surfactant.

In another measurement method suitable especially for insoluble surfactants, a Langmuir trough is used in an oscillating barrier mode. In this case, two barriers that limit the interfacial area are being oscillated sinusoidally and the change in surface tension measured.

== Interfacial shear rheology ==
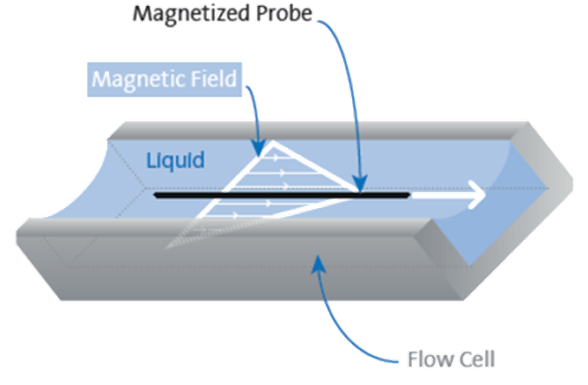
Interfacial shear rheology with the needle method

In interfacial shear rheology, the interfacial area remains the same throughout the measurement. Instead, the interfacial area is sheared in order to be able to measure the surface stress present. The equations are similar to dilatational interfacial rheology but shear modulus is often marked with G instead of E like in dilational methods. In a general case, G and E are not equal.

Since interfacial rheological properties are relatively weak, it causes challenges for the measurement equipment. For high sensitivity, it is essential to maximize the contribution of the interface while minimizing the contribution of the bulk phase. The Boussinesq number, Bo, depicts how sensitive a measurement method is for detecting the interfacial viscoelasticity.

The commercialized measurement techniques for interfacial shear rheology include magnetic needle method, rotating ring method and rotating bicone method. The magnetic needle method, developed by Brooks et al., has the highest Boussinesq number of the commercialized methods. In this method, a thin magnetic needle is oscillated at the interface using a magnetic field. By following the movement of the needle with a camera, the viscoelastic properties of the interface can be detected. This method is often used in combination with a Langmuir trough in order to be able to conduct the experiment as a function of the packing density of the molecules or particles.

== Applications ==
When surfactants are present in a liquid, they tend to adsorb in the liquid-air or liquid-liquid interface. Interfacial rheology deals with the response of the adsorbed interfacial layer on the deformation. The response depends on the layer composition, and thus interfacial rheology is relevant in many applications in which adsorbed layer play a crucial role, for example in development surfactants, foams and emulsions. Many biological systems like pulmonary surfactant and meibum are dependent on interfacial viscoelasticity for their functionality. Interfacial rheology has been employed to understand the structure-function relationship of these physiological interfaces, how compositional deviations cause diseases such as infant respiratory distress syndrome or dry eye syndrome, and has helped to develop therapies like artificial pulmonary surfactant replacements and eye drops.

Interfacial rheology enables the study of surfactant kinetics, and the viscoelastic properties of the adsorbed interfacial layer correlate well with emulsion and foam stability. Surfactants and surface active polymers used are for stabilising emulsions and foams in food and cosmetic industries. Proteins are surface active and adsorb at the interface, where they can change conformation and influence the interfacial properties. Natural surfactants like asphaltenes and resins stabilize water-oil emulsions in crude oil applications, and by understanding their behavior the crude oil separation process can be enhanced. Also enhanced oil recovery efficiency can be optimized.

Specialized setups that allow bulk exchange during interfacial rheology measurements are used to investigate the response of adsorbed proteins or surfactants upon changes in pH or salinity. These setups can also be used to mimic more complex conditions like the gastric environment to investigate the in vitro displacement or enzymatic hydrolysis of polymers adsorbed at oil-water interfaces to understand how respective emulsion are digested the stomach.

Interfacial rheology allows the probation of bacteria adsorption and biofilm formation at liquid-air or liquid-liquid interfaces.

In food science, interfacial rheology was used to understand the stability of emulsions like mayonnaise, the stability of espresso foam, the film formed on black tea, or the formation of kombucha biofilms.

== See also ==
- Rheology
- Langmuir trough
- Tensiometer
- Surface tension
