= Christian P. Speer =

German pediatrician (born 1952)

Christian P. Speer (born 28 August 1952, in Kassel) is a German pediatrician and Professor of Pediatrics specialized in neonatology at the Julius Maximilian University of Würzburg. Speer is known for his scientific and educational contributions in neonatal medicine.

== Biography ==
Speer studied medicine at the University of Göttingen. In 1977 he was licensed as a physician and received his doctorate. He began his residency at the University Children's Hospital Göttingen in 1978 and continued his scientific training at the National Jewish Hospital and Research Center, Denver/Colorado from 1982 to 1983. In 1987, he received a professorship in pediatrics at the University of Göttingen and was appointed professor and director of the Department of Neonatology at the Children's Hospital of the University Hospital of Tübingen in 1994. In 1999, he accepted an appointment as Professor of Pediatrics and Director of the University Children's Hospital in Würzburg and worked in this capacity until his retirement in 2020. Currently, Speer is a senior professor at the Medical Faculty of Würzburg.

== Scientific contribution ==
After basic work on the immune defense of newborns and the early detection of neonatal systemic infections, Speer became part of the inner circle of the "European Collaborative Study Group on Surfactant Replacement" around Professors Bengt Robertson and Tore Curstedt, both Stockholm as well as Henry L. Halliday, Belfast. Since that time he has been working on the clinical optimization of surfactant treatment of premature infants with respiratory distress syndrome; this therapy represents a milestone in neonatal medicine and has dramatically reduced the mortality of premature infants. In 1993, his research group succeeded in identifying a complex inflammatory response in the airways and lungs of preterm infants, which can progress into a chronic lung disease of preterm infants, the bronchopulmonary dysplasia (BPD). These findings have opened the way for various anti-inflammatory therapeutic strategies. In addition to his experimental work on the etiopathogenesis of BPD, Speer's scientific work has focused on the role of pre- and postnatal infections of premature infants with cytomegaloviruses and ureaplasmas, among others.

A variety of other activities describe Speer's scientific involvement: he is "joint Editor-in-Chief" of the journal "Neonatology", co-editor of the "Zeitschrift für Geburtshilfe und Neonatologie" and he has served on numerous editorial boards of international scientific journals and scientific societies. He was secretary of the "Working Group on Neonatology" of the "European Society for Pediatric Research" and president of the "European Association of Perinatal Medicine." In 2021, he was appointed "co-director" of the "Permanent School of Perinatal, Neonatal and Reproductive Medicine (PREIS School)" in Florence.

Speer is a speaker at numerous congresses and symposia in Europe, North and South America, Asia, Australia, the Middle East and South Africa. In addition, he has regularly organized the international symposium "Recent Advances in Neonatal Medicine" since 1996. In spring 2016, he organized together with Prof. Bo Sun Shanghai the international congress "The Neonate - An International Symposium for Asia" in Shanghai, China, for the first time, and the second edition in 2018.

== Awards and member in scientific organizations ==
Speer received a number of international awards and is member in several scientific organizations:

- 1996 election as "Fellow of the Royal College of Physicians", Edinburgh
- 2004 appointment as Geoffrey Thorburn Visiting Professor of the "Perinatal Society of Australia and New Zealand"
- 2006 "Chiesi Award for Excellence in Neonatology", Prague
- 2013 Appointment as Honorary Member of the "American Pediatric Society"
- 2013 Honorary Member of the "Russian Association of Perinatal Medicine"
- 2014 "Maternité Prize" of the "European Association of Perinatal Medicine"

== Publications ==
Speer published more than 340 scientific papers in international and national journals and is the author of several book chapters on acute and chronic pulmonary diseases of premature and newborn infants. Furthermore, he is co-editor of the textbook "Pädiatrie", since 1999, the 5th edition was published by Springer-Verlag in 2019.
