= Mary Ellen Avery =

American pediatrician

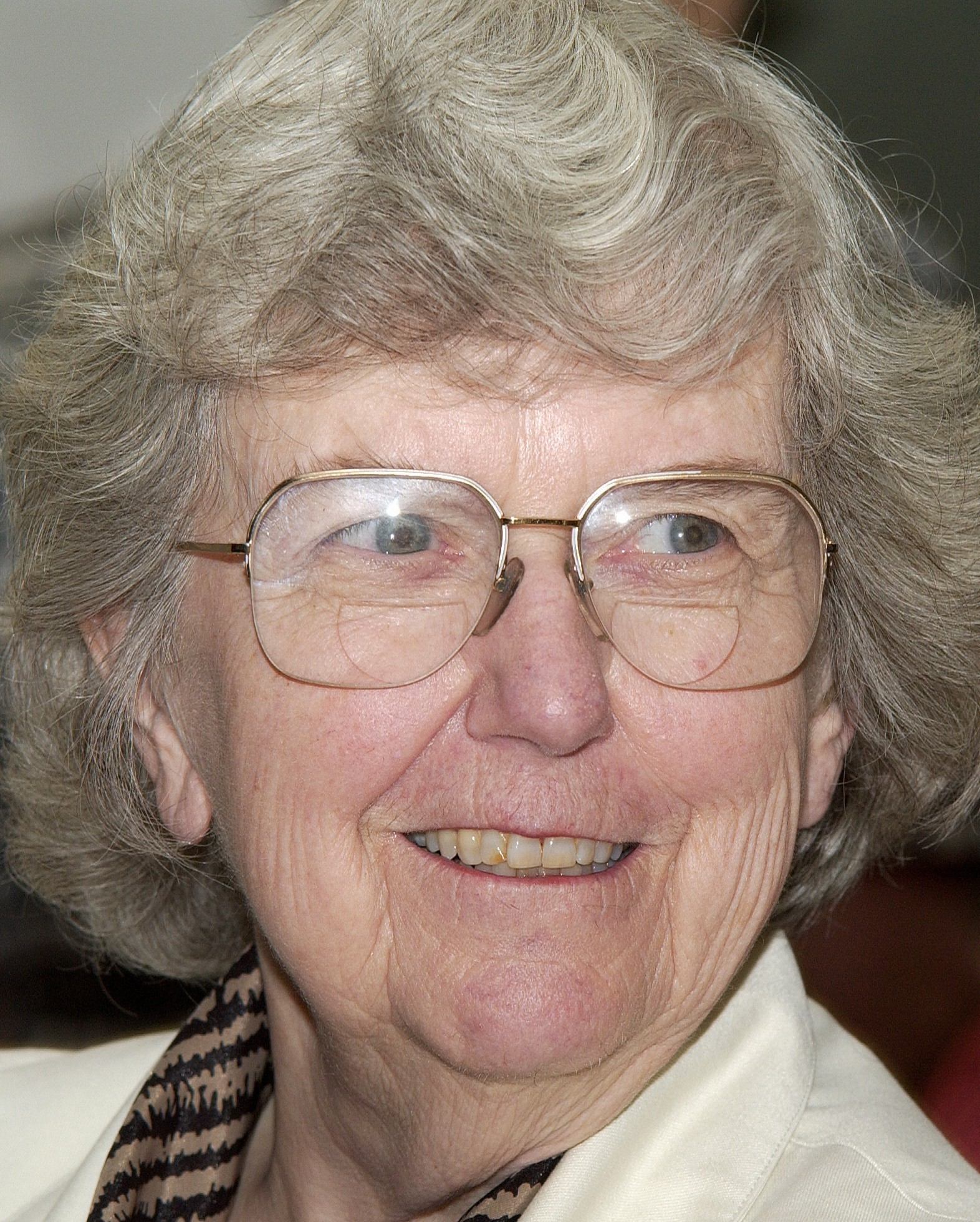
- Avery in June 2004
- Born: May 6, 1927; Camden, New Jersey
- Died: December 4, 2011 (aged 84); Wellesley, Massachusetts
- Education: Wheaton College; Johns Hopkins University
- Awards: E. Mead Johnson Award (1968); National Medal of Science (1991); John Howland Award (2005)
- Scientific career
- Fields: Pediatrics
- Workplaces: Harvard Medical School; Johns Hopkins University; McGill University; Children's Hospital Boston

Mary Ellen Avery (May 6, 1927 – December 4, 2011), also known as Mel, was an American pediatrician. In the 1950s, Avery's pioneering research efforts helped lead to the discovery of the main cause of respiratory distress syndrome (RDS) in premature babies: her identification of surfactant led to the development of replacement therapy for premature infants and has been credited with saving over 830,000 lives. Her childhood, mentors, drive, and education inspired Avery to be the visionary that she was. In 1991 President George H. W. Bush conferred the National Medal of Science on Avery for her work on RDS.

== Early life ==
Mary Ellen Avery was born May 6, 1927, in Camden, New Jersey. Her father owned a manufacturing company in Philadelphia and her mother was vice-principal of a high school in Newark, New Jersey. Avery's parents moved to Moorestown, New Jersey when her older sister was born. It was the 1930s and her father was in need of vision. He was interested in the manufacturing of cotton goods so he took out a loan of $2,000 and opened his company in New Jersey, which would later grow into New York. Although Avery's family had their financial struggles, she had a very pleasant childhood. As a child, Avery would read the stock market to her father since he could not read. Her parents stressed the importance of an education and reading became a great hobby of Avery's. An early inspiration was pediatrician Emily Bacon, who was a professor of pediatrics at Woman's Medical College. Bacon was Avery's next door neighbor and she would visit her frequently. Avery greatly admired Bacon, since she took Avery to see her first premature baby. "She kindly reached out to me in many ways, and I saw her life as more exciting and meaningful than most of the women I knew," Avery has recalled. Bacon's single, career driven lifestyle was inspiring to Avery and she wanted to lead a similar life.

== Education ==
Avery's parents devotion to their daughters education led to both Avery and her older sister to attend Moorestown Friends School, a private school in Moorestown, New Jersey. At the time, Avery was not old enough to attend school, so her mother worked to have the rules changed. Avery was able to begin her education earlier than others, which put her ahead of children in her age group. She continued to be successful in school and even skipped the seventh grade. Avery and her sister were the first in their family to attend college. She went on to attend Wheaton College while her sister finished up at New Jersey College for Women. Graduating summa cum laude from Wheaton College in 1948 with a degree in chemistry, Mary Ellen Avery continued to earn a medical degree from the Johns Hopkins University School of Medicine, where she was one of four women in a class of 90, in 1952. Emily Bacon had attended Johns Hopkins and this was a huge motivation for Avery to get in. During a time of discrimination, Avery knew she had to instill confidence in herself. She once stated, “I know as much as you know. I’ve been to the best school I could get into.” Avery obtained several mentors during her time at Johns Hopkins, which included Dr. Helen Taussig and Dr. Harriet Guild. Being only one of four women, Avery received a lot of attention from her mentors. Soon after graduating, Dr. Avery was diagnosed with tuberculosis, and it was during her recuperation that she became fascinated with how the lungs work. Rest and medication would cure her, but she went about the regimen her own way. Once she realized she was exhibiting no symptoms, she decided to go to Europe with a friend. "I packed one suitcase of medication and another suitcase of clothes, and spent three months in Europe on a regimen that I programmed for myself," Avery said. "It consisted of 12 hours in bed every night, and in the daytime mostly walking around and looking at exhibits and enjoying myself, but not anything strenuous."

== Career ==
Avery returned to Johns Hopkins for her internship and residency, and then moved to Boston in 1957 for a research fellowship in pediatrics at Harvard Medical School. At Harvard, Dr. Avery made a major discovery while comparing the lungs of infants who had died of RDS to those of healthy animals. "It's all because they had something they would have not needed before birth because they weren't using their lungs for ventilation before birth. But after birth, without it, they could not live more than a day or two. And therefore I found what was missing." What she had found was a foamy substance that she deduced must play a critical role. Dr. Avery's observation formed the basis of a breakthrough paper published in the American Journal of Diseases of Children in 1959. By 1995 there were 1,460 infant deaths a year in the U.S. from RDS, down from almost 10,000 a year twenty-five years earlier.

In 1960, Avery became an assistant professor of pediatrics at Johns Hopkins University and pediatrician in charge of newborn nurseries. In 1969, she was appointed physician-in-chief of the Montreal Children's Hospital, the first woman to serve in that position. At the same time, she was appointed professor and the first woman chair of the department of pediatrics at McGill University. In Montreal, Avery designated pediatric care for the Inuit of the eastern Arctic and pediatric education for a medical school in Nairobi. In 1974, Dr. Avery joined the faculty of Harvard Medical School as professor of pediatrics. She was the first woman to head a clinical department at Harvard Medical School. That same year she was the first woman named physician-in-chief at Children's Hospital Boston, where she remained until 1985. During this time, it was important to Avery to advance Boston's basic and applied research in pediatrics. She was able to influence many women to pursue a career in pediatrics and lowered the percent of neonatal deaths. After Avery stepped down, she traveled to many countries with UNICEF to promote oral rehydration therapy and polio vaccination.

In 1990–91, Dr. Avery became the first pediatrician to head the President of the American Pediatric Society. She has been involved in child healthcare delivery worldwide, as an active member of UNICEF.

== Death ==
Avery went into retirement in the late 1990s and she aspired to aid “mothers of the world sharing a common cause that life will be good for their children.” Mary Ellen Avery died on December 4, 2011, at the age of 84 in Wellesley, Massachusetts.

== Notable work ==
- CLEMENTS, JA; AVERY, ME. Lung surfactant and neonatal respiratory distress syndrome. American journal of respiratory and critical care medicine. 157, 4, S59-S66, 1998.
- AVERY, ME. A 50-year overview of perinatal medicine. Early human development. 29, 1–3, 43–50, 1992.
- AVERY, ME; ROTCH, TM. The care of infants and children. Acta paediatrica hungarica. 31, 2, 149–158, 1991.
- AVERY, ME. Historical overview of antenatal steroid use. Pediatrics. 95, 1, 133–135, 1995.
- AVERY, ME. Changes in care of the newborn : personal reflections over forty years. Neonatal network. 13, 6, 1994, 1994.
- AVERY, ME. Pioneers and modern ideas : neonatology. Pediatrics. 102, 1:3, 270–271, 1998.
- AVERY, ME. Significant events in neonatal care. Neonatal network. 13, 6, 1994, 1994.

== Awards and honors ==
- 1968 E. Mead Johnson Award for pediatric research
- 1973 Fellow of the American Academy of Arts and Sciences
- 1984 Trudeau Medal from the American Lung Association
- 1991 National Medal of Science, in recognition of contributions to understanding and treating respiratory distress syndrome. The award cited Avery as one of the founders of neonatal intensive care and "a major advocate of improving access to care of all premature and sick infants."
- 1994 Member of the National Academy of Sciences
- 2005 John Howland Award
