= Tetsurō Fujiwara =

Japanese physician

- Born: 1931; Morioka, Japan
- Died: 2024 (aged 92–93)
- Occupation: physician
- Known for: neonatal medicine

Tetsurō Fujiwara is a Japanese physician. In 1996 he was awarded the King Faisal International Prize in Medicine together with Bengt Robertson for contributions to the understanding of neonatal medicine.
