= Tore Curstedt =

Swedish surfactant scientist

Tore Curstedt (born 1946 in Piteå) is a Swedish physician. Curstedt is primarily known for the development of the synthetic lung surfactant known as Curosurf along with Bengt Robertson.

== Life ==
Curstedt is married to Sol-Britt Curstedt, who is also a physician. The couple have two adult children and five grandchildren.
