= John Allen Clements =

American physician (1923–2024)

John A. Clements
- Born: March 16, 1923; Auburn, New York, U.S.
- Died: September 3, 2024 (aged 101); Tiburon, California, U.S.
- Education: Princeton University; Weill Cornell Medical College
- Known for: Discovery of pulmonary surfactant
- Medical career
- Field: Physiology
- Institutions: University of California, San Francisco
- Sub-specialties: Pulmonary medicine

John Allen Clements (March 16, 1923 – September 3, 2024) was an American physician and physiologist known for his role in the discovery of pulmonary surfactant, a crucial factor in the development of life-saving treatments for neonatal respiratory distress syndrome. His research revolutionized the care of premature infants, greatly reducing infant mortality.

== Early life and education ==
Clements was born on March 16, 1923, in Auburn, New York. He developed an early interest in medicine, completing his undergraduate studies at Princeton University. He graduated from Weill Cornell Medical College in 1947.

== Career ==
Clements began his career as a physiologist focused on cardiovascular research but later shifted to pulmonary medicine. In 1957, while working at the University of California, San Francisco (UCSF), he made his seminal discovery of pulmonary surfactant, a lipid-protein mixture that reduces surface tension in the lungs and prevents the collapse of alveoli during exhalation. This discovery was pivotal in understanding the causes of neonatal respiratory distress syndrome, a common condition in premature infants. Clements, before working at UCSF, had conducted pulmonary research in the early 1950s at the Edgewood Chemical Biological Center. Clements would work at the University of California, San Francisco, for over six decades.

=== Pulmonary surfactant discovery ===
Clements's research demonstrated that the absence or deficiency of surfactant was a major cause of neonatal respiratory distress syndrome in premature infants. His findings spurred the development of synthetic surfactants, which are now routinely used in neonatal intensive care units worldwide to treat preterm infants. This breakthrough dramatically reduced infant mortality and has saved countless lives.

== Later life and legacy ==
Clements continued to contribute to pulmonary biology and neonatal care throughout his career at UCSF, mentoring young scientists and furthering research into adult lung diseases. His contributions to medicine extended beyond his scientific discoveries, influencing generations of researchers and clinicians.

Clements turned 100 in 2023, and died in Tiburon, California on September 3, 2024, at the age of 101.

== Awards ==
- 1983 Gairdner Foundation International Award
- 1994 Lasker-DeBakey Clinical Medical Research Award
- 2008 Pollin Prize for Pediatric Research
