= Surfactant protein B =

Protein-coding gene in the species Homo sapiens

SFTPB
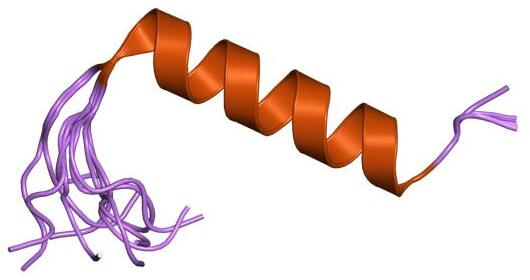

Identifiers
- Aliases: SFTPB, PSP-B, SFTB3, SFTP3, SMDP1, SP-B, surfactant protein B, Surfactant protein B
- External IDs: OMIM: 178640; MGI: 109516; GeneCards: SFTPB
Available structures
PDB	Ortholog search: PDBe RCSB
PDB	List of PDB id codes 1DFW, 1KMR, 1RG3, 1RG4, 1SSZ, 2DWF, 2JOU, 2M0H, 2M1T

Gene location (Human)
Chr.	Chromosome 2 (human)
Band	2p11.2	Start	85,657,314 bp
Band	2p11.2	End	85,668,741 bp

Gene location (Mouse)
Chr.	Chromosome 6 (mouse)
Band	6 C1|6 32.27 cM	Start	72,281,594 bp
Band	6 C1|6 32.27 cM	End	72,291,354 bp
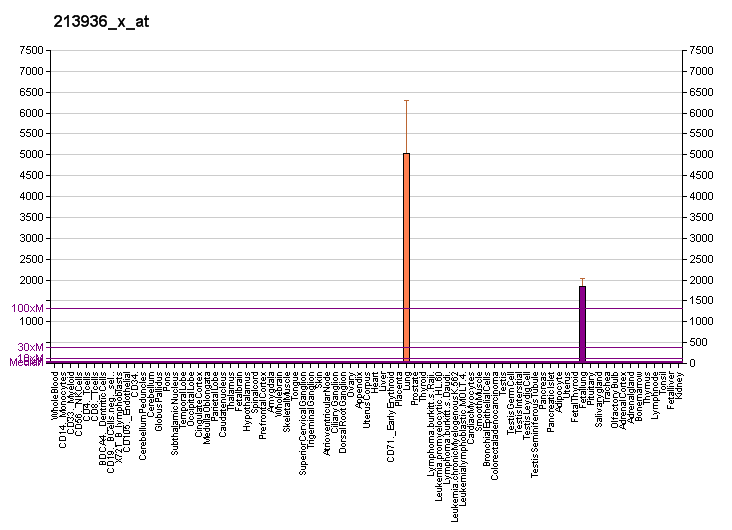

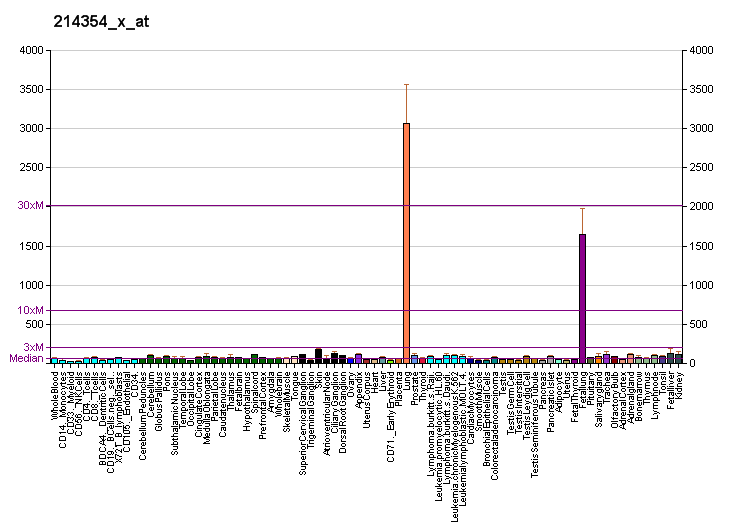
RNA expression pattern
Bgee	Human / Mouse (ortholog); Top expressed in: lower lobe of lung; visceral pleura; upper lobe of lung; upper lobe of left lung; right lung; tendon of biceps brachii; sperm; buccal mucosa cell; right lobe of thyroid gland; mucosa of paranasal sinus / Top expressed in: lung; pulmonary alveolar epithelium; alveolar duct; bronchiole; epithelium of bronchiole; granulocyte; morula; zygote; heart; yolk sac; More reference expression data
BioGPS	More reference expression data
Gene ontology
Molecular function	enzyme activator activity; G protein-coupled receptor binding
Cellular component	multivesicular body; extracellular region; clathrin-coated endocytic vesicle; lysosome; lamellar granule; endoplasmic reticulum membrane; alveolar lamellar body; multivesicular body lumen; nucleoplasm; extracellular space
Biological process	animal organ morphogenesis; respiratory gaseous exchange by respiratory system; sphingolipid metabolic process; lipid metabolism; positive regulation of catalytic activity
Sources:Amigo / QuickGO
Orthologs
Databases	NCBI: entry; OMA: entry
Species	Human	Mouse
Entrez	6439	20388
Ensembl	ENSG00000168878	ENSMUSG00000056370
UniProt	P07988	P50405
RefSeq (mRNA)	NM_000542; NM_198843; NM_001367281	NM_001282071; NM_147779
RefSeq (protein)	NP_000533; NP_942140; NP_001354210	NP_001269000; NP_680088
Location (UCSC)	Chr 2: 85.66 – 85.67 Mb	Chr 6: 72.28 – 72.29 Mb
PubMed search
- Wikidata
View/Edit Human	View/Edit Mouse

Surfactant protein B is an essential lipid-associated protein found in pulmonary surfactant. Without it, the lung would not be able to inflate after a deep breath out. It rearranges lipid molecules in the fluid lining the lung so that tiny air sacs in the lung, called alveoli, can more easily inflate.

== Gene ==
SP-B is encoded by SFTPB, a single, 11425 nucleotide long gene on chromosome 2. Mutations in this gene are the basis for several of the lung conditions mentioned above. Both frameshift mutations and several single nucleotide polymorphisms (SNPs) have been found correlated to a variety of lung conditions. A frame shift mutation responsible for congenital alveolar proteinosis (CAP) was identified by Kattan et al. Many SNP's have been identified in relation to lung conditions. They have been correlated to severe influenza, neonatal respiratory distress syndrome, mechanical ventilation necessity, and more.

== Protein ==
Surfactant protein B (SP-B) is a small protein, weighing about 8 kDa. Proteins are composed of building blocks called amino acids, and SP-B is composed of 79 of them (Valine, alanine, phenylalanine, leucine, isoleucine, and tryptophan being found in the highest levels). Nine of these carry with them a positive charge, and two carry a negative charge, leaving a protein with a net (total) charge of +7. In the body, two molecules of SP-B stick together and form what is called a homodimer. These are found embedded into membranes and other lipid structures, SP-B is a highly hydrophobic, avoiding contact with water.

SP-B is the mature form of a large precursor protein called proSP-B. Synthesized in the endoplasmic reticulum of type II pneumocytes, proSP-B weighs approximately 40 kDa and is cut down to the size of mature SP-B in the golgi apparatus through a process called post-translational modification. ProSP-B is also created in another type of lung cell called a Club cell, but these cells are unable to edit proSP-B into SP-B.

SP-B is a saposin-like protein, which is a group of related proteins known particularly for binding to membranes with negative charges and facilitating either the fusion or lysis (breaking) of the membrane. More well known proteins in this family include saposin-C, NK-lysin, and amoebopore.

== Function ==
SP-B plays a critical role in the functioning of healthy lungs, and its absence inevitably leads to lung conditions, most common of which being acute respiratory distress syndrome (ARDS). Because of this, SP-B's function has been well researched, and has been found to exist in three parts. Beyond these three functions, it is worth noting that SP-B is also thought to have some anti-inflammatory function, though it is not well defined.

=== Indirect surface tension reduction ===
The surface tension at the border between the fluid lining and the inhaled gas (gas/fluid interface) in alveoli determines the motion of the alveoli as a whole. According to Lapace's Law, high surface tension in the gas/fluid interface of alveoli prevents the alveoli from inflating, which causes lung collapse. lipid arrangement in the fluid lining of alveoli is the primary determining factor of this surface tension since the lipids form a thin film (monolayer) on the surface of the fluid lining at the gas/fluid interface. Different lipids allow for different ranges of motion and can be compacted different.

SP-B plays a role in this by selecting certain lipids and inserting them into the gas/fluid interface. The lipid shown to be most needed on this surface (Dipalmitoylphosphatidylcholine) does not easily move to the gas/fluid interface, but SP-B helps ease and speed up this process.

SP-B also indirectly reduces surface tension by organizing the lipids underneath the surface of the gas/fluid interface in structures called tubular myelin. Effectively, SP-B cuts and pastes pieces of the lipid bilayers to form the three dimensional structure of the tubular myelin. This structure is the support and lipid source for the gas/fluid interface, where surface tension is a critical factor in lung function.

=== Direct surface tension reduction ===
Beyond arranging lipids in a way that reduces surface tension, SP-B actually directly interferes with attractive forces between water molecules. This disruption in the cohesion of water minimizes further the surface tension at the gas/fluid interface.

=== Formation of lamellar bodies ===
Lamellar bodies are groups of lipids and protein that are structurally similar to tubular myelin, but are found inside instead of outside the type II pneumocytes. Similarly to its function in organizing tubular myelin, SP-B arranges lipids into the lamellar body structure. Basically, SP-B plays a role in the organogenesis (formation of structure) of lamellar bodies. The lamellar bodies are then secreted into the fluid lining the interior of alveoli, and become tubular myelin. This role is critical for making pulmonary surfactant (see below)

=== SP-B Deficiencies and Issues ===
Acute respiratory distress syndrome, respiratory syncytial virus infection, familial lung disease, and pneumocystis infection are examples of deficiencies in and issues with SP-B that are correlated with lung issues.

Because so many lung conditions are associated with issues around SP-B, synthetic replacements have been researched, created, and manufactured. It has been shown that 21 amino acid long peptides with positive charge and intermittent hydrophobic regions mimicking SP-B can minimize surface tension at the gas/fluid interface, and surfactant replacements for surfactant deficient patients has been used to save lives.

Once lung distress has occurred, SP-B has been shown to be effective as a biomarker in the blood stream. Higher levels of SP-B indicate some kind of lung distress, and can even indicate if the patient is currently a smoker. This may be useful in the future to predict atherosclerosis, a solidifying of vascular tissue that has negative effects on the heart.

== Context in surfactant ==
SP-B is a critical protein for lung function, and is found in the context of pulmonary surfactant. Understanding surfactant is important to gaining a full understanding of SP-B. Surfactant is a mixture of lipids and proteins that coats the inside of alveoli and is essential for life due to its key role in preventing alveolar collapse at low lung volumes. In the absence of surfactant, the surface tension at the gas/fluid interface prevents inhalation at standard pressure, but surfactant minimizes surface tension to values near zero and allows for normal breathing. It is also known to have a role in both the immune response and inflammation control.

Surfactant deficiency is a common cause of respiratory disease. Respiratory distress syndrome (RDS) is a particularly well-known instance of surfactant deficiency because it has a high mortality rate among preterm babies, a variety of other conditions are related to surfactant levels and composition.

Surfactant is composed of primarily lipids (90% by weight), and proteins make up only the remaining 10%. The following two sections will address the lipid and protein components respectively.

=== Surfactant lipids ===
Lipids are a broad category of mid-sized molecules that are hydrophobic or amphipathic. In surfactant, two subcategories of lipids are relevant: phospholipids and sterols. Sterols are represented by cholesterol, which has an important role in the overall structure and motion of the lipids as a whole, but is vastly outnumbered by the phospholipids in surfactant.

DPPC (dipalmitoylphosphatidylcholine), as mentioned above, is a lipid with very useful stabilizing and compacting attributes. SP-B works primarily with this lipid, and moves it to the gas/fluid interface where it minimized surface tension. Essentially, DPPC is so important for lung function because it can shrink or expand to fit the space necessary, and a continually shrinking and expanding lung requires components like this.

Other lipids found commonly in surfactant include phosphatidylglycerol (PG), phosphatidylinositol (PI), phosphatidylethanolamine (PE), and phosphatidylserine (PS).

=== Surfactant proteins ===
SP-B is one of four proteins commonly found in surfactant, the other three being surfactant protein A (SP-A), surfactant protein C (SP-C), and surfactant protein D (SP-D). These four are highly interconnected in their functions in surfactant. For example, though the mechanism is not yet understood, SP-B functions in the post-translational modification of SP-C, and mature SP-C is not formed without SP-B.

SP-C assists in the functions of SP-B, and is most similar to SP-B of the three other surfactant proteins. It is smaller, only 35 amino acids long, and is found embedded in lipid structures much like SP-B.

SP-A and SP-D, known together as collectins, are more distinct from SP-B than SP-C. They are hydrophilic, so they are found in the solution, and function in immune response instead of lipid arrangement and surface tension reduction. SP-A is actually a name for two very similar proteins, SP-A1 and SP-A2.

Along with SP-A, B, C, and D, blood plasma proteins are found in very small quantities in surfactant as well.
