= Lamellar bodies =

Secretory organelles

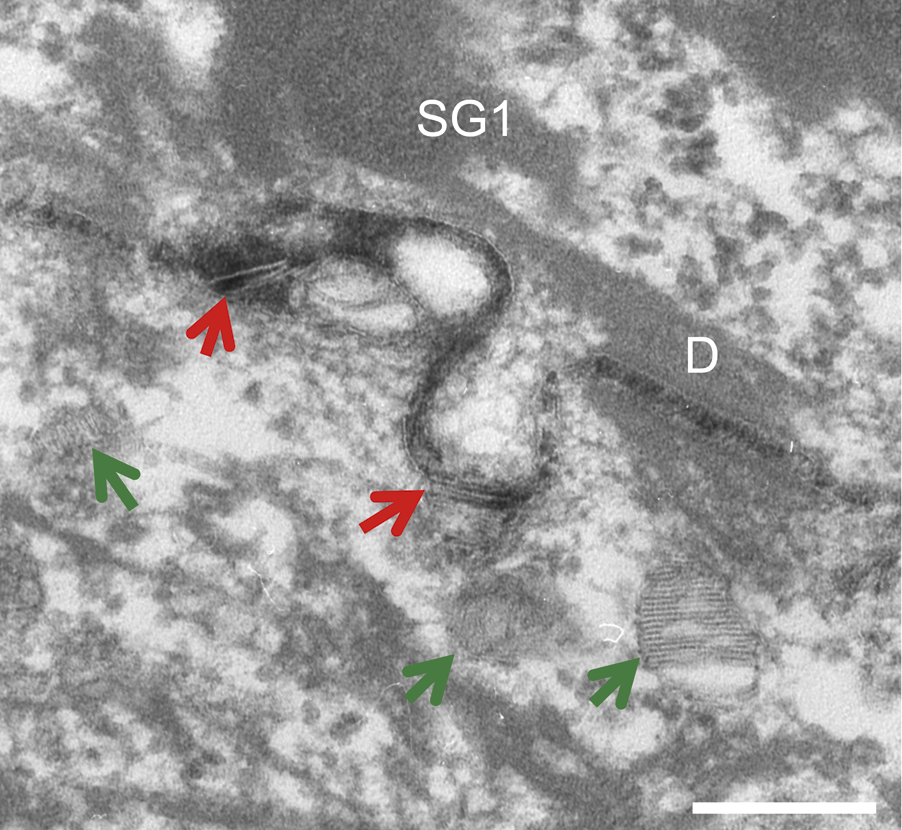
Red arrows indicate secreted lamellar bodies, and green arrows indicate lamellar bodies in the cytoplasm. Scale bar = 200 nm.

In cell biology, lamellar bodies (otherwise known as lamellar granules, membrane-coating granules (MCGs), keratinosomes or Odland bodies) are secretory organelles found in type II alveolar cells in the lungs, and in keratinocytes in the skin. They are oblong structures, appearing about 300-400 nm in width and 100-150 nm in length in transmission electron microscopy images. Lamellar bodies in the alveoli of the lungs fuse with the cell membrane and release pulmonary surfactant into the extracellular space.

== Role in lungs ==
In alveolar cells the phosphatidylcholines (choline-based phospholipids) that are stored in the lamellar bodies serve as pulmonary surfactant after being released from the cell. In 1964, using transmission electron microscopy, which at that time was a relatively new tool for ultrastructural elucidation, John Balis identified the presence of lamellar bodies in type II alveolar cells, and further noted that upon their exocytotic migration to the alveolar surface, lamellar contents would uniformly unravel and spread along the circumference of the alveolus, thus lowering surface tension and similarly, the required alveolar inflation force.

== Role in epidermis ==
In the upper stratum spinosum and stratum granulosum layers of the epidermis, lamellar bodies are secreted from keratinocytes, resulting in the formation of an impermeable, lipid-containing membrane that serves as a water barrier and is required for correct skin barrier function. These bodies release components that are required for skin shedding (desquamation) in the uppermost epidermal layer, the stratum corneum. These components include lipids (e.g. glucosylceramides), hydrolytic enzymes (e.g. proteases, acid phosphatases, glucosidases, lipases) and proteins (e.g. corneodesmosin). Lamellar bodies have been observed to contain distinct aggregates of the secreted components glucosylceramide, cathepsin D, KLK7, KLK8 and corneodesmosin. Transportation of molecules via lamellar bodies is thought to prevent enzymes from interacting with their relevant substrates or inhibitors prior to secretion.

Recent work suggests that lamellar bodies form a continuous membranous structure with the trans-Golgi network.

Lamellar body secretion and lipid structure is abnormal in the epidermis of patients with Netherton syndrome, a skin disorder characterised by chronic inflammation and universal pruritus (itch).

Deficient lipid membrane causes cold damage in patients of asteatotic eczema (also known as winter eczema).

== See also ==
- Lecithin–sphingomyelin ratio
