= Calfactant =

Mixture used in medicine

Clinical data
- Trade names: Infasurf
- Pregnancy category: N
- ATC code: none

Legal status
- Legal status: US: ℞-only

Identifiers
- CAS Number: 183325-78-2
- ChemSpider: none
- UNII: Q4K217VGA9
- ChEMBL: ChEMBL1201447

Calfactant, also known as Infasurf, is an intratracheal suspension derived from the natural surfactant in calf lungs. It is used in premature infants with lung surfactant deficiency that causes infant respiratory distress syndrome (IRDS).

== Mechanism of action ==
Lung surfactant is essential for effective ventilation as it modifies alveolar surface tension. IRDS is caused by a lung surfactant deficiency. Calfactant serves as a substitute for the natural surfactant.
