= Colfosceril palmitate =

Pharmaceutical drug

Clinical data
- Trade names: Exosurf
- Other names: [2-({[2,3-bis(hexadecanoyloxy)propyl] phosphonato}oxy)ethyl]trimethylazanium
- AHFS/Drugs.com: International Drug Names
- ATC code: R07AA01 (WHO)

Identifiers
- IUPAC name: 2,3-di(hexadecanoyloxy)propyl 2-trimethylazaniumylethyl phosphate
- CAS Number: 63-89-8
- PubChem CID: 6138
- ChemSpider: 5908
- UNII: 319X2NFW0A
- KEGG: D03585
- ChEMBL: ChEMBL1200737
- CompTox Dashboard (EPA): DTXSID5046720
- ECHA InfoCard: 100.000.516

Chemical and physical data
- Formula: C_{40}H_{80}NO_{8}P
- Molar mass: 734.053 g·mol^{−1}
- 3D model (JSmol): Interactive image
- SMILES: O=C(OCC(OC(=O)CCCCCCCCCCCCCCC)COP([O-])(=O)OCC[N+](C)(C)C)CCCCCCCCCCCCCCC
- InChI: InChI=1S/C40H80NO8P/c1-6-8-10-12-14-16-18-20-22-24-26-28-30-32-39(42)46-36-38(37-48-50(44,45)47-35-34-41(3,4)5)49-40(43)33-31-29-27-25-23-21-19-17-15-13-11-9-7-2/h38H,6-37H2,1-5H3; Key:KILNVBDSWZSGLL-UHFFFAOYSA-N

Colfosceril palmitate (trade name Exosurf) is a drug used as a pulmonary surfactant. It is a drug that is used in surfactant deficient conditions such as infant respiratory distress syndrome in newborns.

== See also ==
- Dipalmitoylphosphatidylcholine
