= Pulmonary surfactant =

Complex of different phospholipids and proteins

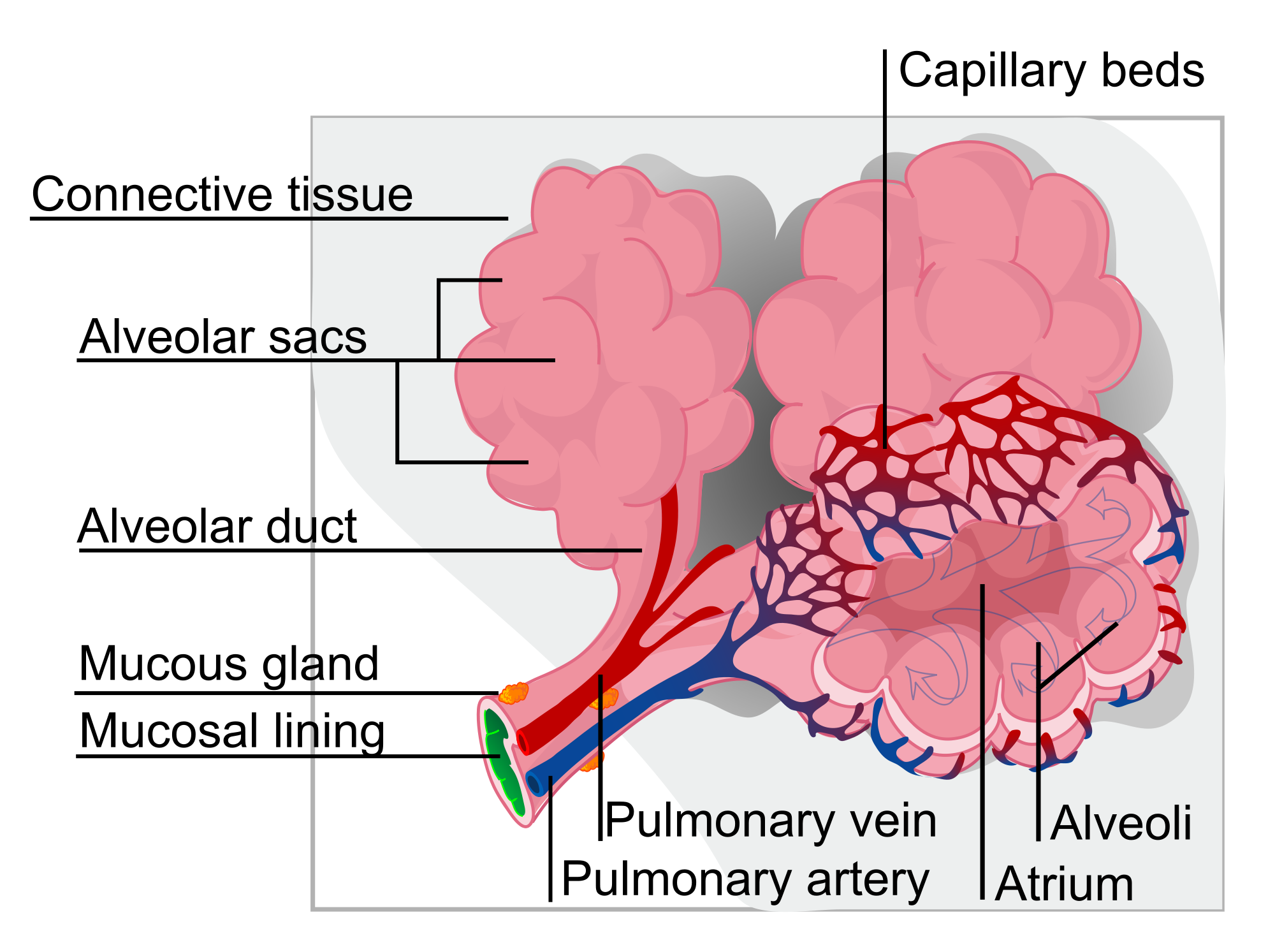
Alveoli are the spherical outcroppings of the respiratory bronchioles.

Pulmonary surfactant is a surface-active complex of phospholipids and proteins formed by type II alveolar cells. The proteins and lipids that make up the surfactant have both hydrophilic and hydrophobic regions. By adsorbing to the air-water interface of alveoli, with hydrophilic head groups in the water and the hydrophobic tails facing towards the air, the main lipid component of the surfactant, dipalmitoylphosphatidylcholine (DPPC), reduces surface tension.

As a medication, pulmonary surfactant is on the WHO Model List of Essential Medicines, the most important medications needed in a basic health system.

== Function ==
- To increase pulmonary compliance.
- To prevent atelectasis (collapse of the alveoli or atriums) at the end of expiration.
- To facilitate recruitment of collapsed airways.

Alveoli can be compared to gas in water, as the alveoli are wet and surround a central air space. Pulmonary surfactant significantly reduces the work of breathing by minimizing alveolar surface tension, allowing alveoli to expand more easily during inspiration. The surface tension acts at the air-water interface and tends to make the bubble smaller (by decreasing the surface area of the interface). The gas pressure (P) needed to keep an equilibrium between the collapsing force of surface tension (γ) and the expanding force of gas in an alveolus of radius r is expressed by the Young–Laplace equation:

$$P = \frac{2\gamma}{r}$$

=== Compliance ===
Compliance is the ability of lungs and thorax to expand. Lung compliance is defined as the volume change per unit of pressure change across the lung. Measurements of lung volume obtained during the controlled inflation/deflation of a normal lung show that the volumes obtained during deflation exceed those during inflation, at a given pressure. This difference in inflation and deflation volumes at a given pressure is called hysteresis and is due to the air-water surface tension that occurs at the beginning of inflation. However, surfactant decreases the alveolar surface tension, as seen in cases of premature infants with infant respiratory distress syndrome. The normal surface tension for water is 70 dyn/cm (70 mN/m) and in the lungs, it is 25 dyn/cm (25 mN/m); however, at the end of the expiration, compressed surfactant phospholipid molecules decrease the surface tension to very low, near-zero levels. Pulmonary surfactant thus greatly reduces surface tension, increasing compliance allowing the lung to inflate much more easily, thereby reducing the work of breathing. It reduces the pressure difference needed to allow the lung to inflate. The lung's compliance, and ventilation decrease when lung tissue becomes diseased and fibrotic.

=== Alveolar size regulation ===
As the alveoli increase in size, the surfactant becomes more spread out over the surface of the liquid. This increases surface tension effectively slowing the rate of expansion of the alveoli. This also helps all alveoli in the lungs expand at the same rate, as one that expands more quickly will experience a large rise in surface tension slowing its rate of expansion. It also means the rate of shrinking is more regular as if one reduces in size more quickly the surface tension will reduce more, so other alveoli can contract more easily than it can. Surfactant reduces surface tension more readily when the alveoli are smaller because the surfactant is more concentrated.

=== Prevention of fluid accumulation and maintenance of dryness of airways ===
Surface tension draws fluid from capillaries to the alveolar spaces. Surfactant reduces fluid accumulation and keeps the airways dry by reducing surface tension.

=== Innate immunity ===
Surfactant immune function is primarily attributed to two proteins: SP-A and SP-D. These proteins can bind to sugars on the surface of pathogens and thereby opsonize them for uptake by phagocytes. It also regulates inflammatory responses and interacts with the adaptive immune response. Surfactant degradation or inactivation may contribute to enhanced susceptibility to lung inflammation and infection.

== Composition ==
- ~40% dipalmitoylphosphatidylcholine (DPPC);
- ~40% other phospholipids (PC);
- ~10% surfactant proteins (SP-A, SP-B, SP-C and SP-D);
- ~10% neutral lipids (Cholesterol);
- Traces of other substances.

=== Lipids ===
==== DPPC ====
Dipalmitoylphosphatidylcholine (DPPC) is a phospholipid with two 16-carbon saturated chains and a phosphate group with quaternary amine group attached. The DPPC is the strongest surfactant molecule in the pulmonary surfactant mixture. It also has a higher compaction capacity than the other phospholipids, because the apolar tail is less bent. Nevertheless, without the other substances of the pulmonary surfactant mixture, the DPPC's adsorption kinetics is very slow. This happens primarily because the phase transition temperature between gel to liquid crystal of pure DPPC is 41.5 °C, which is higher than the human body's temperature of 37 °C.

==== Other phospholipids ====
Phosphatidylcholine molecules form ~85% of the lipid in surfactant and have saturated acyl chains. Phosphatidylglycerol (PG) forms about 11% of the lipids in the surfactant, it has unsaturated fatty acid chains that fluidize the lipid monolayer at the interface. Neutral lipids and cholesterol are also present. The components for these lipids diffuse from the blood into type II alveolar cells where they are assembled and packaged for secretion into secretory organelles called lamellar bodies.

=== Proteins ===
Proteins make up the remaining 10% of the surfactant. Half of this 10% is plasma proteins but the rest is formed by the apolipoproteins, surfactant proteins SP-A, SP-B, SP-C, and SP-D. The apolipoproteins are produced by the secretory pathway in type II cells. They undergo much post-translational modification, ending up in the lamellar bodies. These are concentric rings of lipid and protein, about 1 μm in diameter.

- SP-A and SP-D are collectins. They confer innate immunity as they have carbohydrate recognition domains that allow them to coat bacteria and viruses promoting phagocytosis by macrophages. SP-A is also thought to be involved in a negative feedback mechanism to control the production of surfactant.
- SP-B and SP-C are hydrophobic membrane proteins that increase the rate that surfactant spreads over the surface. SP-B and SP-C are required for the proper biophysical function of the lung. Humans and animals born with a congenital absence of the saposin family SP-B experience intractable respiratory failure whereas those born lacking SP-C tend to develop progressive interstitial pneumonitis.

The SP proteins reduce the critical temperature of DPPC's phase transition to a value lower than 37 °C, which improves its adsorption and interface spreading velocity. The compression of the interface causes a phase change of the surfactant molecules to liquid-gel or even gel-solid. The fast adsorption velocity is necessary to maintain the integrity of the gas exchange region of the lungs.

Each SP protein has distinct functions, which act synergistically to keep an interface rich in DPPC during lung's expansion and contraction. Changes in the surfactant mixture composition alter the pressure and temperature conditions for phase changes and the phospholipids' crystal shape as well. Only the liquid phase can freely spread on the surface to form a monolayer. Nevertheless, it has been observed that if a lung region is abruptly expanded the floating crystals crack like "icebergs". Then the SP proteins selectively attract more DPPC to the interface than other phospholipids or cholesterol, whose surfactant properties are worse than DPPC's. The SP also fastens the DPPC on the interface to prevent the DPPC from being squeezed out when the surface area decreases This also reduces the interface compressibility.

== Artificial surfactants ==
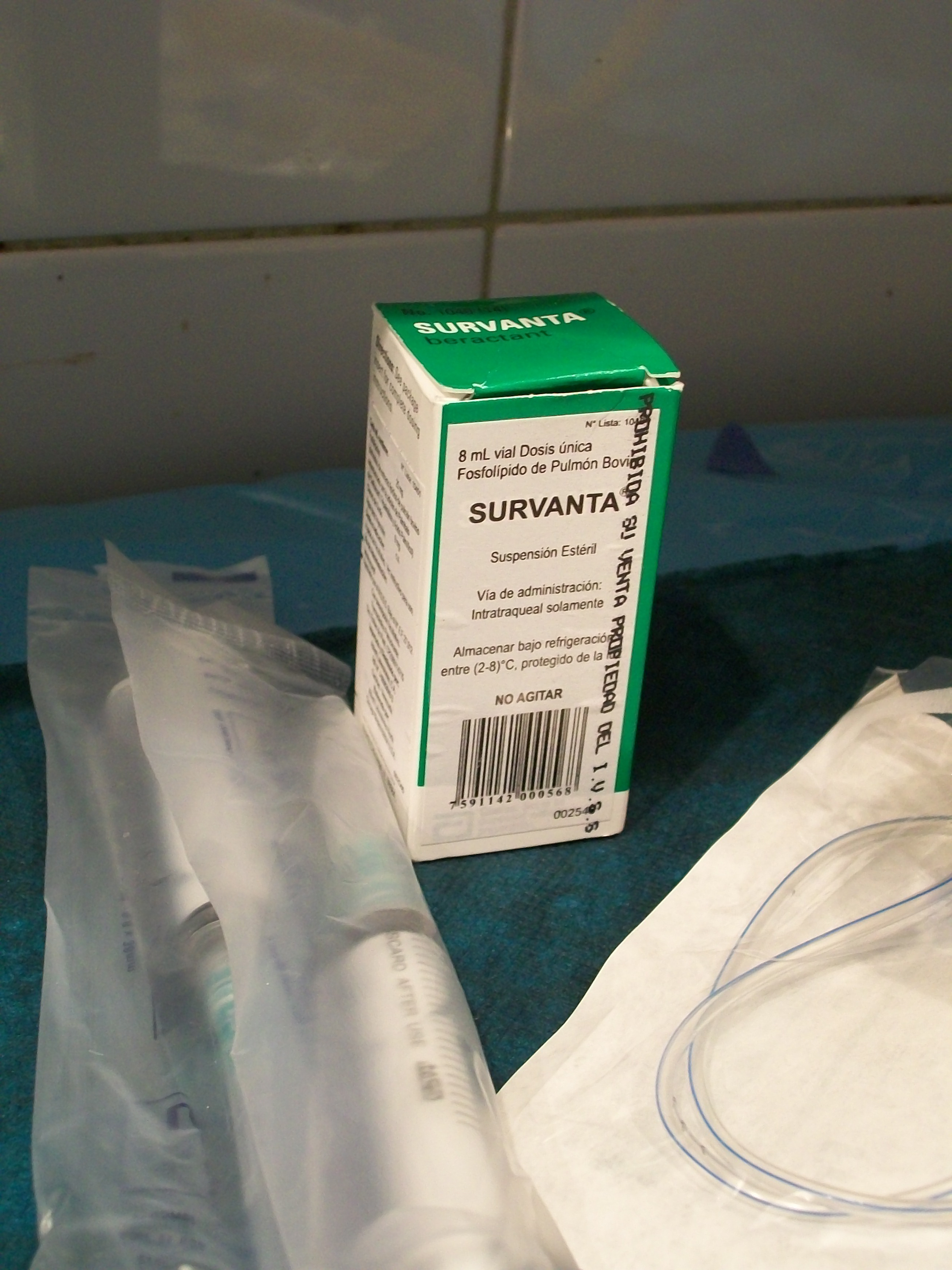
Survanta, surrounded by devices for its application.

There are a number of types of pulmonary surfactants available. Ex-situ measurements of surface tension and interfacial rheology can help to understand the functionality of pulmonary surfactants.

Synthetic pulmonary surfactants

1. Colfosceril palmitate (Exosurf) - a mixture of DPPC with hexadecanol and tyloxapol added as spreading agents
2. Pumactant (Artificial Lung Expanding Compound or ALEC) - a mixture of DPPC and PG
3. KL-4 - composed of DPPC, palmitoyl-oleoyl phosphatidylglycerol, and palmitic acid, combined with a 21 amino acid synthetic peptide that mimics the structural characteristics of SP-B.
4. Venticute - DPPC, PG, palmitic acid and recombinant SP-C
5. Lucinactant - DPPC, POPG, and palmitic acid.

Animal derived surfactants

1. Beractant
  1. (Alveofact) - extracted from cow lung lavage fluid
  2. (Survanta) - extracted from minced cow lung with additional DPPC, palmitic acid, and tripalmitin
  3. (Beraksurf) -extracted from minced calf lung with additional DPPC, palmitic acid, and tripalmitin
2. Calfactant (Infasurf) - extracted from calf lung lavage fluid
3. Poractant alfa (Curosurf) - extracted from material derived from minced pig lung
4. Ovinactant (Varasurf) - extracted from material derived from minced sheep lung

== Surface tension magnitude inside the lung ==
Even though the surface tension can be greatly reduced by pulmonary surfactant, this effect will depend on the surfactant's concentration on the interface. The interface concentration has a saturation limit, which depends on temperature and mixture composition. Because during ventilation there is a variation of the lung surface area, the surfactant's interface concentration is not usually at the level of saturation. The surface increases during inspiration, which consequently opens space for new surfactant molecules to be recruited to the interface. Meanwhile, during expiration the surface area decreases at a rate which is always in excess of the rate at which the surfactant molecules are driven from the interface into the water film. Thus, the surfactant density at the air water interface remains high and is relatively preserved throughout expiration, decreasing the surface tension even further. This also explains why the compliance is greater during expiration than during inspiration.

SP molecules contribute to increasing the surfactant interface adsorption kinetics, when the concentration is below the saturation level. They also make weak bonds with the surfactant molecules at the interface and hold them longer there when the interface is compressed. Therefore, during ventilation, surface tension is usually lower than at equilibrium. Therefore, the surface tension varies according to the volume of air in the lungs, which protects them from atelectasis at low volumes and tissue damage at high volume levels.

Surface tension values
Condition	Tension (mN/m)
Water at 25 °C	70
Pulmonary surfactant in equilibrium at 36 °C	25
Healthy lung at 100% of TLC	30
Healthy lung between 40 and 60% of TLC	1~6
Healthy lung below 40% of TLC	<1

== Production and degradation ==
Surfactant production in humans begins in type II cells during the alveolar sac stage of lung development. Lamellar bodies appear in the cytoplasm at about 20 weeks gestation. These lamellar bodies are secreted by exocytosis into the alveolar lining fluid, where the surfactant forms a meshwork of tubular myelin Full term infants are estimated to have an alveolar storage pool of approximately 100 mg/kg of surfactant, while preterm infants have an estimated 4–5 mg/kg at birth.

Club cells also produce a component of lung surfactant.

Alveolar surfactant has a half-life of 5 to 10 hours once secreted. It can be both broken down by macrophages and/or reabsorbed into the lamellar structures of type II pneumocytes. Up to 90% of surfactant DPPC (dipalmitoylphosphatidylcholine) is recycled from the alveolar space back into the type II pneumocyte. This process is believed to occur through SP-A stimulating receptor-mediated, clathrin dependent endocytosis. The other 10% is taken up by alveolar macrophages and digested.

== Diseases ==
- Infant respiratory distress syndrome (IRDS) is caused by lack of surfactant, commonly seen in premature babies born before 28–32 weeks of gestation.
- Congenital surfactant deficiency
- Pulmonary alveolar proteinosis
- Surfactant metabolism dysfunction

== History ==
In late 1920s von Neergaard identified the function of the pulmonary surfactant in increasing the compliance of the lungs by reducing surface tension. However the significance of his discovery was not understood by the scientific and medical community at that time. He also realized the importance of having low surface tension in lungs of newborn infants. Later, in the middle of the 1950s, Pattle and Clements rediscovered the importance of surfactant and low surface tension in the lungs. At the end of that decade it was discovered that the lack of surfactant caused infant respiratory distress syndrome (IRDS).
