= Beractant =

Drug for neonatal respiratory distress syndrome

Clinical data
- Trade names: Survanta, others
- AHFS/Drugs.com: Monograph
- Routes of administration: Endotracheal
- ATC code: None

Legal status
- Legal status: AU: S4 (Prescription only); UK: POM (Prescription only); US: ℞-only

Identifiers
- CAS Number: 108778-82-1
- DrugBank: DB06761
- ChemSpider: none
- UNII: S866O45PIG
- KEGG: D03096
- ChEMBL: ChEMBL1201624
- CompTox Dashboard (EPA): DTXSID70883180

Beractant, also known by the trade name of Survanta, is a modified bovine pulmonary surfactant containing bovine lung extract (phospholipids, neutral lipids, fatty acids, and bovine surfactant proteins), to which synthetic DPPC, tripalmitin and palmitic acid are added. The composition provides 25 mg/mL phospholipids, 0.5 to 1.75 mg/mL triglycerides, 1.4 to 3.5 mg/mL free fatty acids, and <1.0 mg/mL total surfactant proteins. As an intratracheal suspension, it can be used for the prevention and treatment of neonatal respiratory distress syndrome. Survanta is manufactured by Abbvie.

Beractant is on the World Health Organization's List of Essential Medicines.

== Generic form ==
Beraksurf is generic form of Survanta (Beractant) which is manufactured by Tekzima.
