= Surfactant protein C =

Protein-coding gene in the species Homo sapiens

SFTPC
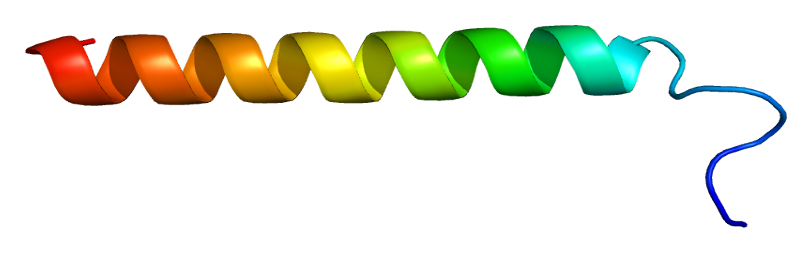

Identifiers
- Aliases: SFTPC, BRICD6, PSP-C, SFTP2, SMDP2, SP-C, surfactant protein C, SP5
- External IDs: OMIM: 178620; MGI: 109517; GeneCards: SFTPC
Available structures
PDB	Ortholog search: PDBe RCSB
PDB	List of PDB id codes 2YAD

Gene location (Human)
Chr.	Chromosome 8 (human)
Band	8p21.3	Start	22,156,913 bp
Band	8p21.3	End	22,164,479 bp

Gene location (Mouse)
Chr.	Chromosome 14 (mouse)
Band	14 D2|14 36.32 cM	Start	70,758,389 bp
Band	14 D2|14 36.32 cM	End	70,761,521 bp
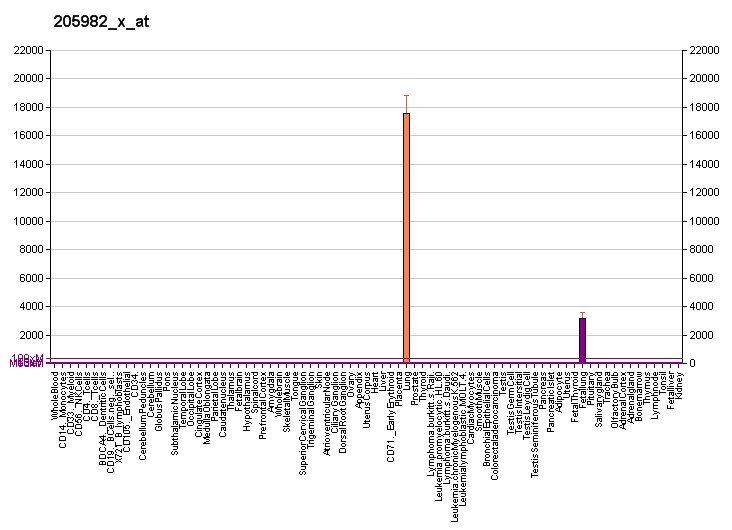

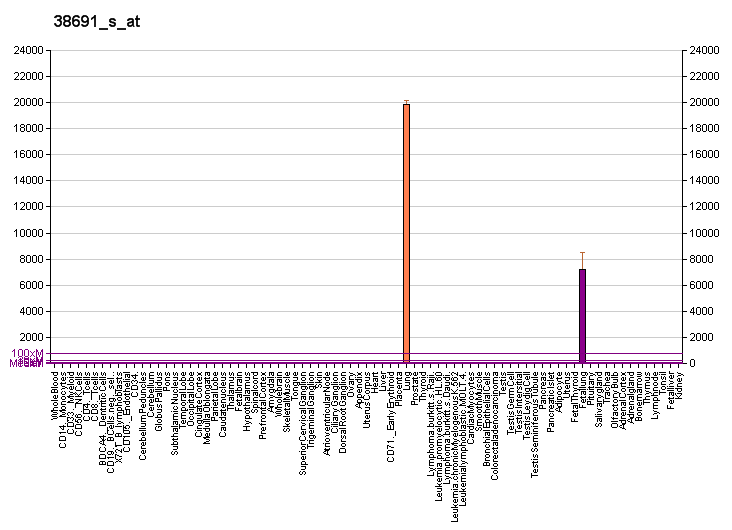

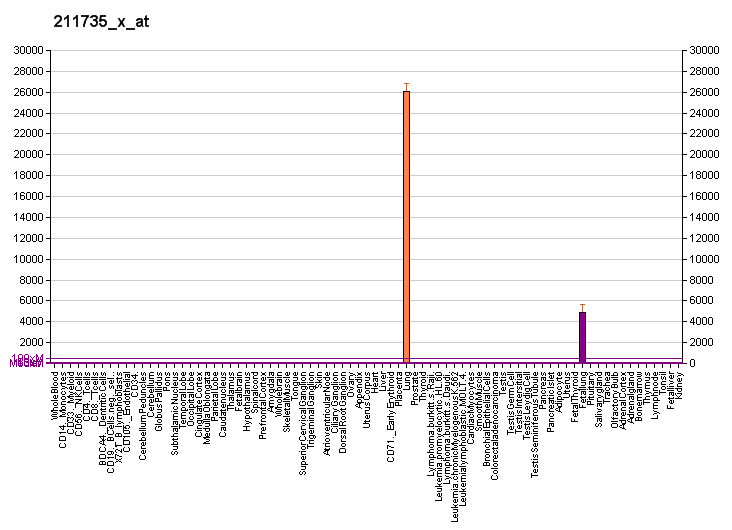
RNA expression pattern
Bgee	Human / Mouse (ortholog); Top expressed in: lower lobe of lung; right lung; upper lobe of lung; upper lobe of left lung; visceral pleura; tendon of biceps brachii; C1 segment; parotid gland; apex of heart; internal globus pallidus / Top expressed in: right lung lobe; left lung lobe; morula; pulmonary alveolus; human fetus; alveolar duct; sexually immature organism; lip; pulmonary alveolar epithelium; lung parenchyma; More reference expression data
BioGPS	More reference expression data
Gene ontology
Molecular function	protein binding; identical protein binding
Cellular component	extracellular region; clathrin-coated endocytic vesicle; lamellar granule; endoplasmic reticulum membrane; multivesicular body lumen; extracellular space
Biological process	respiratory gaseous exchange by respiratory system
Sources:Amigo / QuickGO
Orthologs
Databases	NCBI: entry; OMA: entry
Species	Human	Mouse
Entrez	6440	20389
Ensembl	ENSG00000168484	ENSMUSG00000022097
UniProt	P11686	P21841; Q6P8P8
RefSeq (mRNA)	NM_001172357; NM_001172410; NM_003018; NM_001317778; NM_001317779 NM_001317780	NM_011359
RefSeq (protein)	NP_001165828; NP_001165881; NP_001304707; NP_001304708; NP_001304709 NP_003009	NP_035489
Location (UCSC)	Chr 8: 22.16 – 22.16 Mb	Chr 14: 70.76 – 70.76 Mb
PubMed search
- Wikidata
View/Edit Human	View/Edit Mouse

Surfactant protein C (SP-C), is one of the pulmonary surfactant proteins. In humans this is encoded by the SFTPC gene.

It is a membrane protein.

== Structure ==
Surfactant protein C, N terminal propeptide
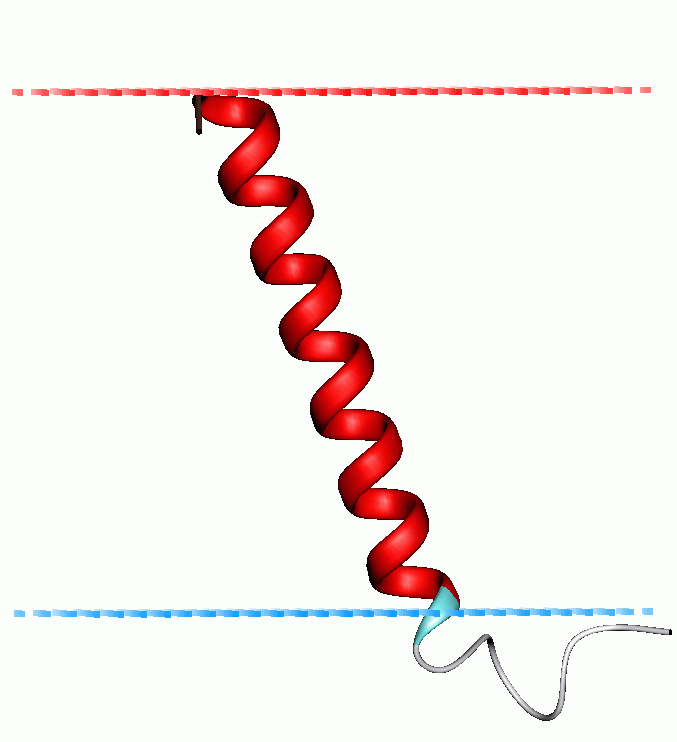
- Pig SP-C, corresponds to human mature form

Identifiers
- Symbol: SP_C-Propep
- Pfam: PF08999
- InterPro: IPR001729
- PROSITE: PDOC00298
- OPM superfamily: 69
- OPM protein: 1spf
Available protein structures:
- PDB: IPR001729 PF08999 (ECOD; PDBsum)
- AlphaFold: IPR001729; PF08999

SFTPC is a 197-residue protein made up of two halves: a unique N-terminal propeptide domain and a C-terminal BRICHOS domain. The around 100-aa long propeptide domain actually contains not only the cleaved part, but also the mature peptide. It can be further broken down into a 23-aa helical transmembrane propeptide proper, the mature secreted SP-C (24-58), and a linker (59-89) that connects to the BRICHOS domain.

The propeptide of pulmonary surfactant C has an N-terminal alpha-helical segment whose suggested function was stabilization of the protein structure, since the mature peptide can irreversibly transform from its native alpha-helical structure to beta-sheet aggregates and form amyloid fibrils. The correct intracellular trafficking of proSP-C has also been reported to depend on the propeptide.

The structure of the BRICHOS domain has been solved. Mutations in this domain also lead to amyloid fibrils made up of the mature peptide, suggesting a chaperone activity.

== Clinical significance ==
Mutations are associated with surfactant metabolism dysfunction type 2.

Humans and animals born lacking SP-C tend to develop progressive interstitial lung disease.

Recombinant SP-C is used in Venticute, an artificial lung surfactant.

A process to mass-produce an analogue called rSP-C33Le by fusion with spidroin has been described.
