= Dipalmitoylphosphatidylcholine =

Names
- IUPAC name 1,2-Dipalmitoylphosphatidylcholine

Identifiers
CAS Number	63-89-8
3D model (JSmol)	Interactive image
ChemSpider	398235
ECHA InfoCard	100.018.322
PubChem CID	452110
UNII	319X2NFW0A
CompTox Dashboard (EPA)	DTXSID50910226
- InChI: InChI=1S/C40H80NO8P/c1-6-8-10-12-14-16-18-20-22-24-26-28-30-32-39(42)46-36-38(37-48-50(44,45)47-35-34-41(3,4)5)49-40(43)33-31-29-27-25-23-21-19-17-15-13-11-9-7-2/h38H,6-37H2,1-5H3/t38-/m1/s1 Key: KILNVBDSWZSGLL-KXQOOQHDSA-N; InChI=1/C40H80NO8P/c1-6-8-10-12-14-16-18-20-22-24-26-28-30-32-39(42)46-36-38(37-48-50(44,45)47-35-34-41(3,4)5)49-40(43)33-31-29-27-25-23-21-19-17-15-13-11-9-7-2/h38H,6-37H2,1-5H3/t38-/m1/s1
- SMILES: O=C(OC[C@@H](OC(=O)CCCCCCCCCCCCCCC)COP([O-])(=O)OCC[N+](C)(C)C)CCCCCCCCCCCCCCC

Properties
Chemical formula	C_{40}H_{80}NO_{8}P
Molar mass	734.053 g·mol^{−1}
- Surface tension
CMC	4.6 ± 0.5 × 10^{−10} M
- Except where otherwise noted, data are given for materials in their standard state (at 25 °C [77 °F], 100 kPa). verify (what is ?) Infobox references

Dipalmitoylphosphatidylcholine (DPPC) is a phospholipid (and a lecithin) consisting of two C_{16} palmitic acid groups attached to a phosphatidylcholine head-group.

It is the main constituent of pulmonary surfactants, which reduces the work of breathing and prevents alveolar collapse during breathing. It also plays an important role in the study of liposomes and human bilayers.

== Lung surfactant ==
Lung surfactant (LS) is a surface-active material produced by most air-breathing animals for the purpose of reducing the surface tension of the water layer where gas exchange occurs in the lungs, given that the movements due to inhalation and exhalation may cause damage if there is not enough energy to sustain alveolar structural integrity.

The monolayer formed by the LS on the interface is composed primarily of phospholipids (80%), in addition to proteins (12%) and neutral lipids (8%). Among the phospholipids, the most prevalent one is phosphatidylcholine (PC, or lecithin) (70–85%), which in turn is the basis of a pool of similar diacylphosphatidylcholines of which 50% is dipalmitoylphosphatidylcholine or DPPC.

While DPPC itself already has the ability to reduce the surface tension of the alveolar liquid, the proteins and other lipids in the surfactant further facilitate the adsorption of oxygen into the air-liquid interface.

DPPC is a variant of phosphatidylcholine. Its structure includes both a hydrophilic "head" and hydrophobic "tails", and it is this arrangement that makes it able to reduce the surface tension of the water layer. The choline radical constitutes the polar hydrophilic head; it is oriented towards and extends into the alveolar liquid. The palmitic acid (C_{16}) chains form the nonpolar hydrophobic tails; these are oriented towards the outer side.

== Biosynthesis ==
The synthesis of the phospholipids contained in pulmonary surfactant takes place in the endoplasmic reticulum of type II pneumocytes. Pulmonary surfactant has both protein and lipid components. More specifically, it has been found that phosphatidylcholine (PC) is the most abundant phospholipid (70%–85%), and that PC is primarily present as dipalmitoylphosphatidylcholine (DPPC).

De novo synthesis of phosphatidylcholine in the lung arises primarily from cytidine diphosphate-choline (CDP-choline). The transformation of CDP-choline to phosphatidylcholine is effected by choline phosphate cytidyltransferase. Under certain conditions the enzymes choline kinase, glycerol-3-phosphate acyltransferase and phosphatidate phosphatase may play regulatory roles.

Of the total DPPC in the pulmonary surfactant, 45% comes from de novo biosynthesis. The rest is formed by transacylation mechanisms that exchange palmitoyl groups for the unsaturated acyl chains of other related diacylphosphatidylcholines. Removal of the acyl chains from these related compounds produces lysophosphatidylcholine; reacylation with palmitoyl-CoA is then facilitated by lysophosphatidylcholine acyltransferase to form DPPC.

== Characteristics ==
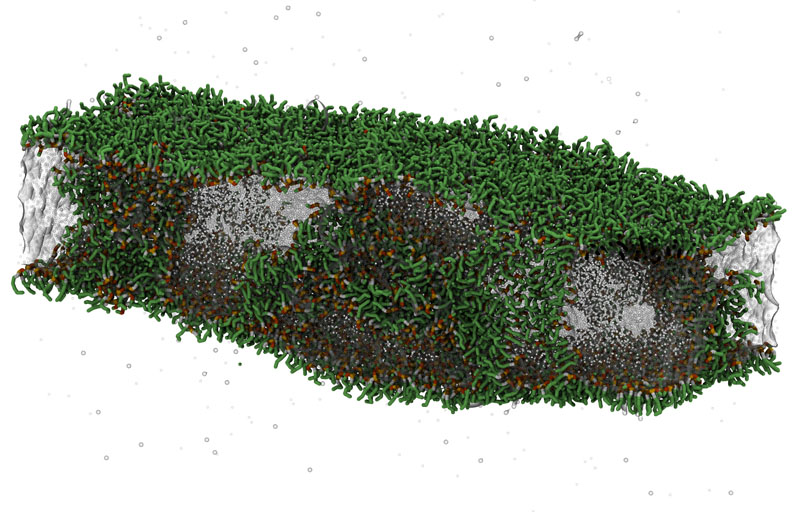
A single time-point "snapshot" of a molecular dynamics simulation of DPPC lipid bilayer formation in a two phase system. DPPC (color elements) interacts with water molecules (transparent part) in the image.

=== Temperature ===
This phospholipid is found in a solid/gel phase at 37 °C (at the effective temperature of the human body). Its melting point is around 41.3 °C. Therefore, when the temperature is above 41 °C, DPPC is no longer found in a gel phase but in a liquid one.

When in contact with silica surfaces, it has been demonstrated that DPPC bilayers have different properties depending on the temperature.

Layer thickness remains the same at 25 °C and at 39 °C. However, when the temperature is further increased to 55 °C, the DPPC bilayer structure changes significantly, which causes a decrease in the layer thickness. The reason for this trait is that, in fact, at 55 °C DPPC is found in a disordered liquid state, whereas at a lower temperature it is found in a more-ordered gel state.

Temperature affects the layer's roughness too, which starts to change slightly when temperature is lowered to 25 °C.

Finally, the load-bearing capacity of the bilayer is higher when the temperature exceeds the phase transition temperature (due to its increased fluidity). When this molecule is found in a liquid state, where the fluidity is much higher, it is thought that the bilayer also develops a self-healing capacity.

=== Amphipathic behaviour ===
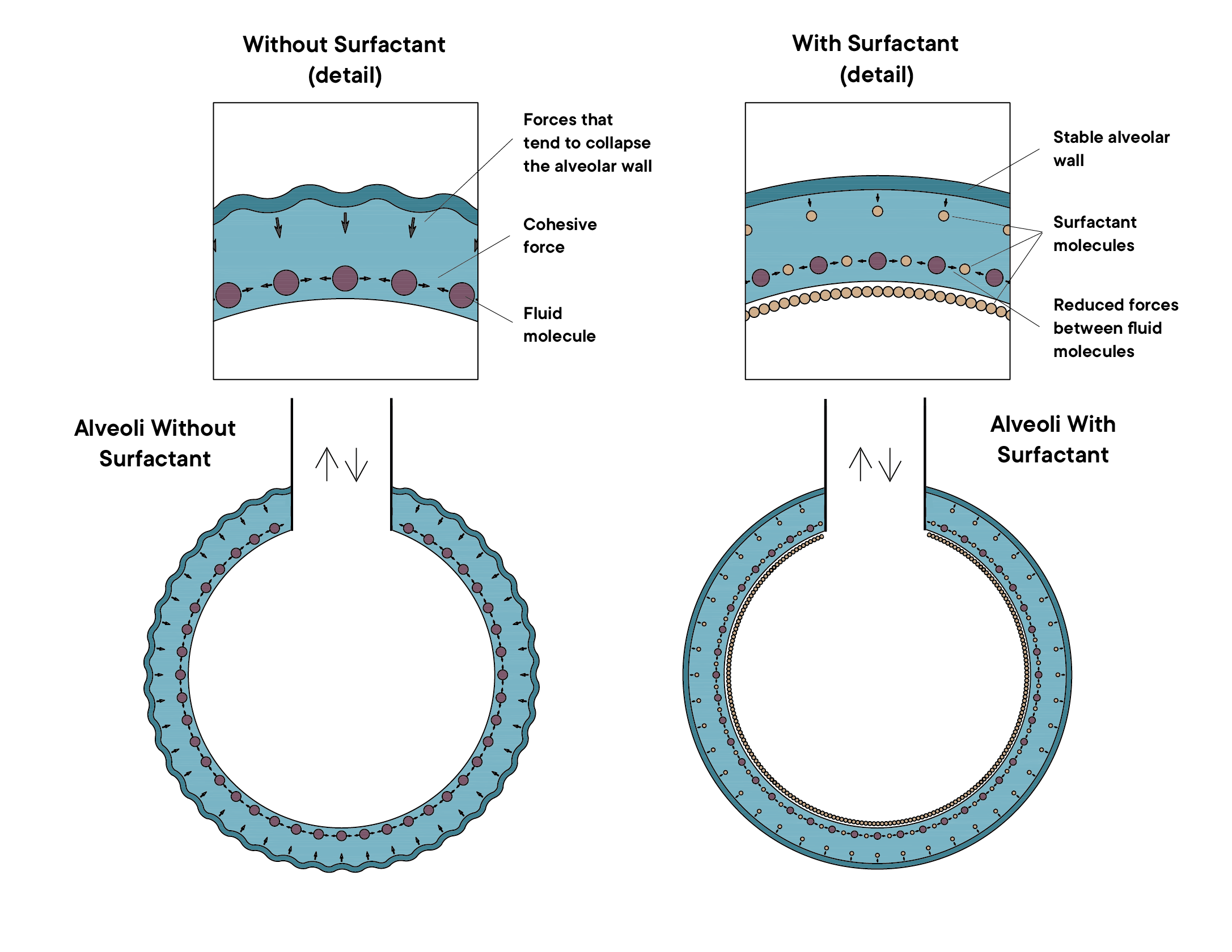
Simple Diagram showing surfactant's function in stopping the collapse of the alveoli when exhaling

DPPC is an amphipathic lipid. This characteristic is due to its hydrophilic head, composed of the polar phosphatidylcholine group, and its hydrophobic tails, formed by two nonpolar palmitic acid (C_{16}) chains. This trait allows DPPC to easily and spontaneously form micelles, monolayers, bilayers and liposomes when it is in contact with a polar solvent.

=== Surfactant ===
DPPC is the main phospholipid of pulmonary surfactant, and it is surface-active due to its amphipathic behaviour and its adsorption capacity. However, adsorption is not optimal at human body temperature for DPPC alone, because at 37 °C it is found in a gel phase. The presence of some unsaturated phospholipids (such as dioleoylphosphatidylcholine [DOPC] or phosphatidylglycerol) and cholesterol increases the surfactant's fluidity, so it can adsorb oxygen more efficiently. When this mixture contacts water, for example, it accumulates at the water-air interface and forms a thin superficial pellicule of surfactant. The polar heads of the molecules composing the surfactant are attracted by the polar molecules of the liquid (in this case, H_{2}O molecules), causing a significant diminution of the water's surface tension.

== Current uses ==
=== Research uses ===
DPPC is usually used for research purposes, such as creating liposomes and bilayers which are involved in bigger studies. The Langmuir–Blodgett technique allows the synthesis of liposomal DPPC bilayers. Currently, these liposomes are used in the study of the properties of this phosphatidylcholine and of its use as a mechanism of drug delivery in the human body.

Furthermore, because vesicle fusion dynamics are different for lipids in the gel phase versus the fluid phase, it allows scientists to use DPPC along with DOPC in Atomic Force Microscopy and Atomic Force Spectroscopy.

=== Pharmaceutical uses ===
Dipalmitoylphosphatidylcholine (DPPC) is routinely used to formulate some medicines used for treatment of respiratory distress syndrome (RDS) in newborns. Current synthetic surfactants are combinations of DPPC along with other phospholipids, neutral lipids and lipoproteins.

The treatment of preterm infants with RDS using surfactants was initially developed in the 1960s, and recent studies have demonstrated an improvement in clinical outcomes. The first treatment given to some newborns with RDS was surfactant phospholipids, specifically DPPC, by means of an aerosol (Robillard, 1964). This treatment proved ineffective because administration of DPPC alone did not provide any beneficial effects. Subsequently, studies were carried out to find more effective drugs for treatment of this disease.

Pulmonary surfactants can be classified into three types:

The first generation of protein-free synthetic surfactants contained only DPPC. The best known is colfosceril palmitate.

The second generation of surfactants were of natural (animal) origin, and were obtained from the lungs of cattle or pigs. The surfactants extracted from bovine lungs were Infasurf and Alvofact, the porcine lung extracts included Curosurf, and those made from modified bovine lung extracts included Survanta or Beraksurf (Beractant). Unlike newborns with RDS that were administered first-generation drugs, those that were treated with these second-generation surfactants required less oxygen and ventilatory support within 72 hours of drug administration.

The third generation of surfactants incorporates synthetic peptides or recombinant proteins. These use a mixture of different components. DPPC is the agent used to decrease surface tension, and the rest of the components help increase oxygen adsorption. The best known are Venicute and Surfaxin. These drugs are still under development, so there is as yet no evidence as to whether they possess advantages compared to the second-generation preparations.

DPPC is also used to form liposomes that are used as components of drug delivery systems.

== DPPC-related illnesses ==
Surfactant Dysfunction Disorder is a disease that affects newborn children whose pulmonary surfactant is insufficient for adequate breathing, resulting in respiratory distress syndrome (RDS).

Despite DPPC being one of the major components of lung surfactant, most of the genetic errors that are linked with surfactant dysfunction disorder are not linked to DPPC. Rather, the main causes of this disease are differences in the production of surfactant proteins B and C due to genetic abnormalities.

However, there is a genetic condition that is related to DPPC which causes a deficiency in the production of ABCA1 protein. This protein is crucial in the transport of phospholipids – and therefore DPPC – to the lamellar bodies of the alveolar cells, where DPPC interacts with surfactant proteins to form pulmonary surfactant.

Current studies cannot find a correlation between the percentage of DPPC in lung surfactant and the age of gestation, although a proven relationship has been found between the percentage of DPPC and POPC (palmitoyl-oleoyl phosphatidylcholine) in babies with respiratory distress syndrome compared with babies without this condition. These connections suggest that a particular surfactant composition will lead to respiratory distress syndrome, regardless of gestational age.

The correlation between DPPC percentage and respiratory distress syndrome is why DPPC is used to make drugs to treat newborn infants with the disease.

In addition, DPPC has been shown to be related to infection of polarized cells by a specific kind of human adenovirus (HAdV-C2). Some studies have indicated that desaturated DPPC boosts infection of A59 cells with HAdV-C2 (possibly by permitting virus entry via the apical side of polarized cells).
