= Neonatal intensive care unit =

Intensive care for newborn infants

Neonatal Intensive Care Unit
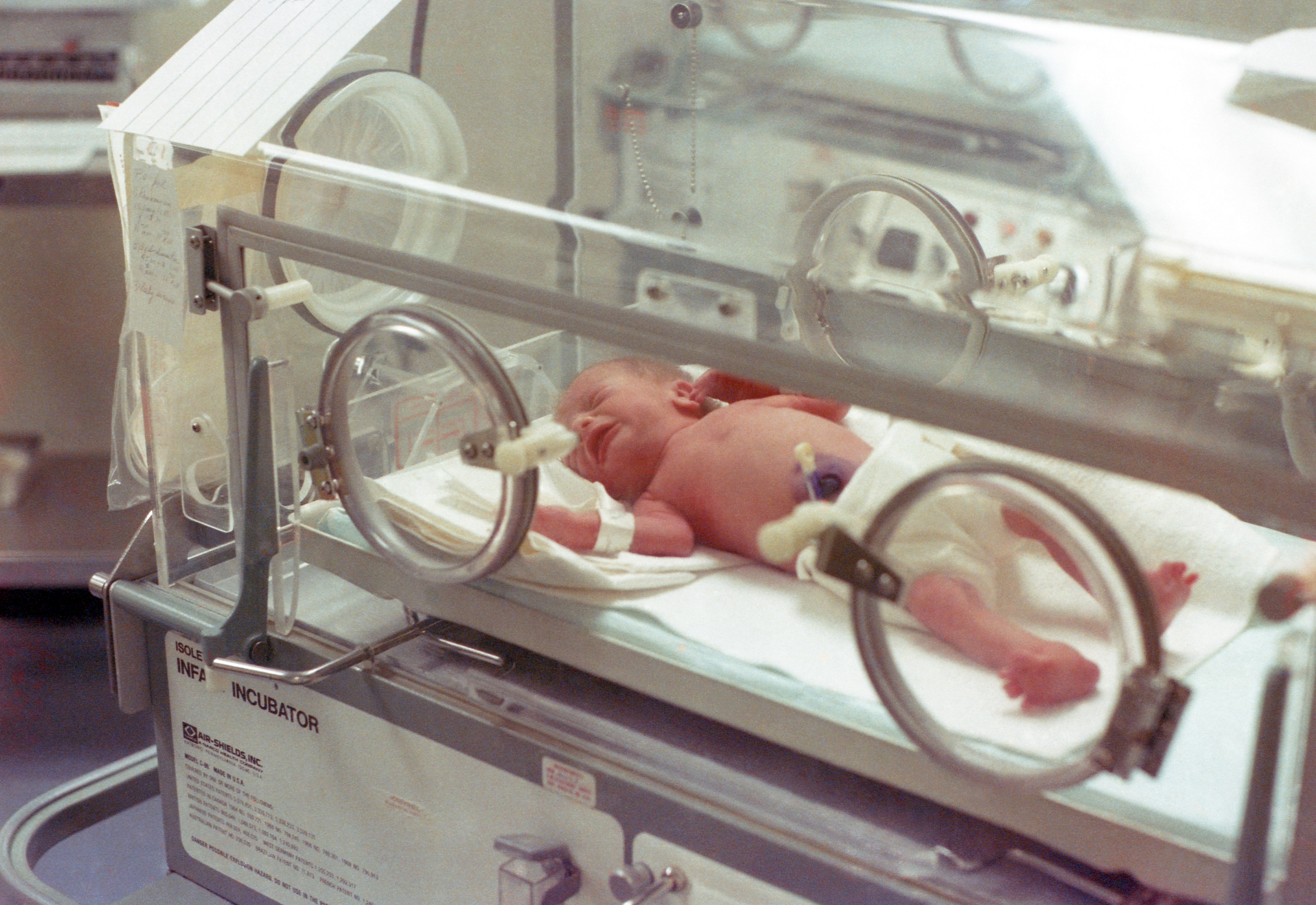
- A premature infant in an incubator. 1978, US
- Specialty: Neonatology

A neonatal intensive care unit (NICU), a.k.a. an intensive care nursery (ICN), is an intensive care unit (ICU) specializing in the care of ill or premature newborn infants. The NICU is divided into several areas, including a critical care area for babies who require close monitoring and intervention, an intermediate care area for infants who are stable but still require specialized care, and a step down unit where babies who are ready to leave the hospital can receive additional care before being discharged.

Neonatal refers to the first 28 days of life. Neonatal care, including specialized nurseries or intensive care, has been around since the 1960s.

The first American newborn intensive care unit, designed by Louis Gluck, was opened in October 1960 at Yale New Haven Hospital.

An NICU is typically directed by one or more neonatologists and staffed by resident physicians, nurses, nurse practitioners, pharmacists, physician assistants, respiratory therapists, and dietitians. Many other ancillary disciplines and specialists are available at larger units.

The term neonatal comes from neo, 'new', and natal, 'pertaining to birth or origin'.

== Roles and tasks ==
A neonatal nurse practitioner is a registered nurse who has been specially trained to help with the care of a newborn. A dietitian helps ensure the baby gets enough nutrients for healthy growth. A respiratory therapist helps with managing oxygen and ventilators (breathing machines). A physical or occupational therapist watches the baby's development.

== Nursing and neonatal populations ==
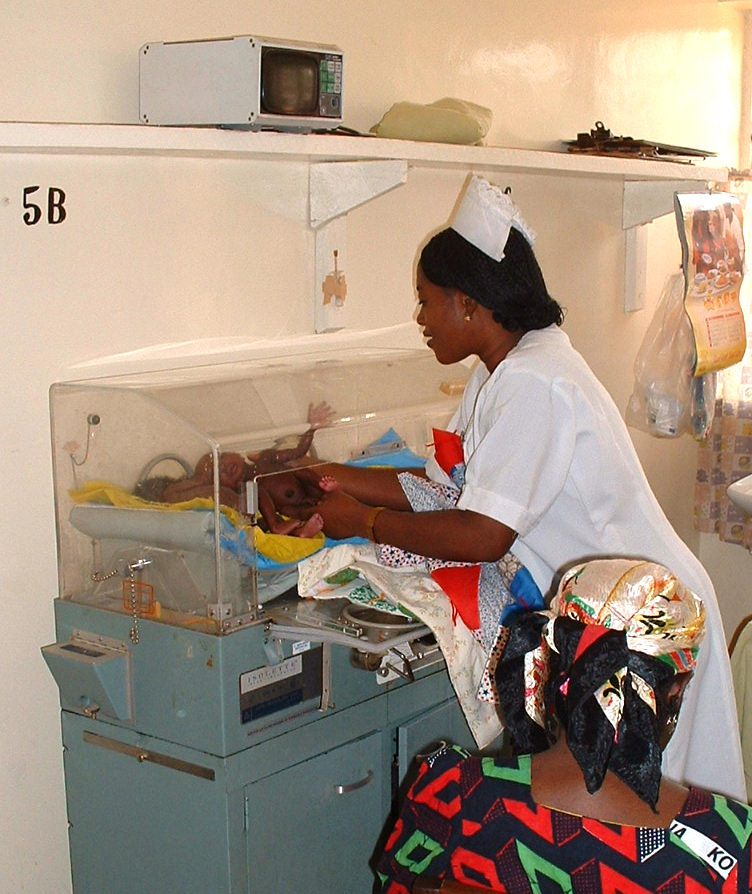
A pediatric nurse checking recently born triplets in an incubator at ECWA Evangel Hospital, Jos, Nigeria

Healthcare institutions have varying entry-level requirements for neonatal nurses. Neonatal nurses are registered nurses (RNs), and therefore must have an Associate of Science in Nursing (ASN) or Bachelor of Science in Nursing (BSN) degree. Some countries or institutions may also require a midwifery qualification. Some institutions may accept newly graduated RNs having passed the NCLEX exam; others may require additional experience working in adult-health or medical/surgical nursing.

Some countries offer postgraduate degrees in neonatal nursing, such as the Master of Science in Nursing (MSN) and various doctorates. A nurse practitioner may be required to hold a postgraduate degree. The National Association of Neonatal Nurses recommends two years' experience working in a NICU before taking graduate classes.

As with any registered nurse, local licensing or certifying bodies, as well as employers, may set requirements for continuing education.

There are no mandated requirements to becoming an RN in an NICU, although neonatal nurses must have certification as a neonatal resuscitation provider. Some units prefer new graduates who do not have experience in other units, so they may be trained in the specialty exclusively, while others prefer nurses with more experience.

Intensive-care nurses undergo intensive didactic and clinical orientation in addition to their general nursing knowledge in order to provide highly specialized care for critical patients. Their competencies include the administration of high-risk medications, management of high-acuity patients requiring ventilator support, surgical care, resuscitation, advanced interventions such as extracorporeal membrane oxygenation or hypothermia therapy for neonatal encephalopathy procedures, as well as chronic-care management or lower acuity cares associated with premature infants such as feeding intolerance, phototherapy, or administering antibiotics. NICU RNs undergo annual skills tests and are subject to additional training to maintain contemporary practice.

== History ==
The problem of premature and congenitally ill infants is not a new one. As early as the 17th and 18th centuries, there were scholarly papers published that attempted to share knowledge of interventions. It was not until 1922, however, that hospitals started grouping the newborn infants into one area, now called the neonatal intensive care unit (NICU).

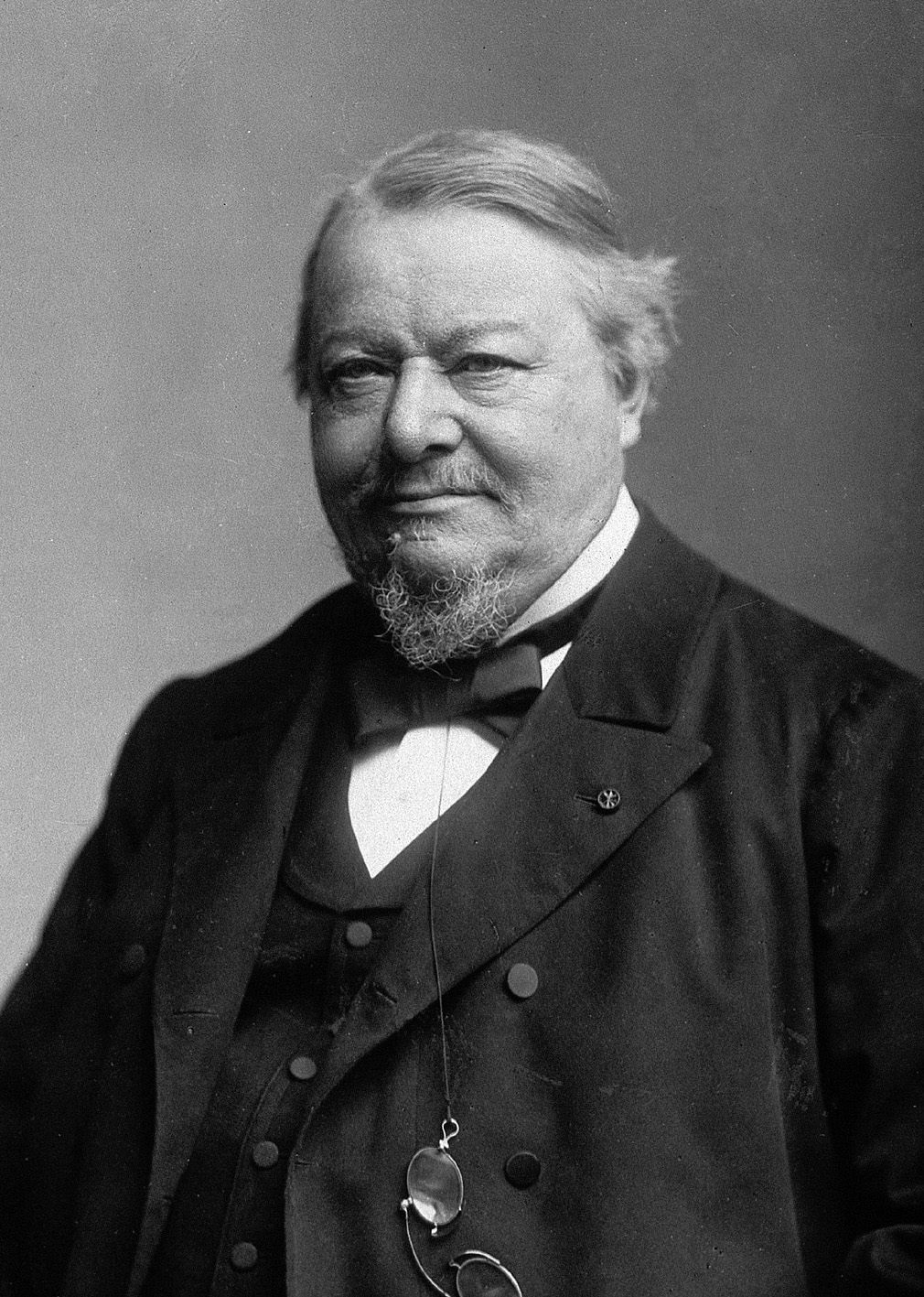
Stéphane Tarnier

Before the Industrial Revolution, premature and ill infants were born and cared for at home and either lived or died without medical intervention. In the mid-nineteenth century, the infant incubator was first developed, based on the incubators used for chicken eggs. Stephane Tarnier is generally considered to be the father of the incubator (or isolette as it is now known), having developed it in 1880 to attempt to keep premature infants in a Paris maternity ward warm. Other methods had been used before, but this was the first closed model; in addition, he helped convince other physicians that the treatment helped premature infants. France became a forerunner in assisting premature infants, in part due to its concerns about a falling birth rate.

After Tarnier retired, Pierre Budin, followed in his footsteps, noting the limitations of infants in incubators and the importance of breastmilk and the mother's attachment to the child. Budin is known as the father of modern perinatology, and his seminal work The Nursling (Le Nourisson in French) became the first major publication to deal with the care of the neonate. The incubator was improved in 1890 in Marseilles by Alexandre Lion, who founded in 1891 the Œuvre Maternelle des Couveuses d'Enfants in Nice and in January 1896 in Paris.

Another factor that contributed to the development of modern neonatology was Martin Couney and his permanent installment of premature babies in incubators at Coney Island. A more controversial figure, he studied under Budin and brought attention to premature babies and their plight through his display of infants as sideshow attractions at Coney Island and the World's Fair in New York and Chicago in 1933 and 1939, respectively. Infants had also previously been displayed in incubators at the 1897, 1898, 1901, and 1904 World Fairs.

=== Early years ===
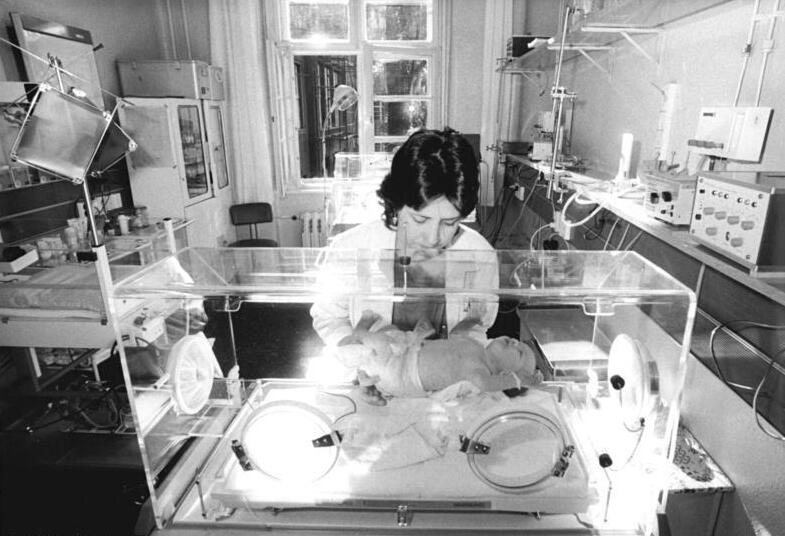
Children's hospital at the Oskar-Ziethen Hospital, Berlin, in 1989

Doctors took an increasing role in childbirth from the eighteenth century onward. However, the care of newborn babies, sick or well, remained largely in the hands of mothers and midwives. Some baby incubators, similar to those used for hatching chicks, were devised in the late nineteenth century. In the United States, these were shown at commercial exhibitions, complete with babies inside, until 1931. Robert Bauer, at Henry Ford Hospital in Detroit, Michigan, successfully combined oxygen, heat, humidity, ease of accessibility, and ease of nursing care in 1931. It was not until after the Second World War that special-care baby units (SCBUs, pronounced 'scaboos') were established in many hospitals. In Britain, early SCBUs opened in Birmingham and Bristol, the latter set up with only £100. In 1946, pediatrician Beryl Corner established a special-care baby unit at Southmead Hospital in Bristol, which became a model for other units in the United Kingdom.

Incubators were expensive, so the whole room was often kept warm instead. Cross-infection between babies was greatly feared. Strict nursing routines involved staff wearing gowns and masks, constant hand-washing, and minimal handling of babies. Parents were sometimes allowed to watch through the windows of the unit. Much was learned about feeding—frequent, tiny feeds seemed best—and breathing. By the mid-1950's, high concentrations of supplemental oxygen had been identified as a cause of retinopathy of prematurity, then known as retrolental fibroplasia, which could result in blindness.

The 1960s were a time of rapid medical advances, particularly in respiratory support, that were at last making the survival of premature newborn babies a reality. Very few babies born before thirty-two weeks survived and those who did often had neurological impairments. Herbert Barrie in London pioneered advances in resuscitation of the newborn. Barrie published his seminal paper on the subject in The Lancet in 1963. One of the concerns at this time was the worry that using high pressures of oxygen could be damaging to newborn lungs. Barrie developed an underwater safety valve in the oxygen circuit. The tubes were originally made of rubber, but these had the potential to irritate sensitive newborn tracheas: Barrie switched to plastic. This new endotracheal tube, based on Barrie's design, was known as the "St Thomas's tube". In 1964, pediatric radiologist William Northway – while conversing with neonatologist Philip Sunshine at – noted a consistent pattern of cystic changes in the lungs on the radiographs of premature babies. Northway found that all of the babies had received high concentrations of oxygen and mechanical ventilation, causing damage. His 1967 paper in which the term bronchopulmonary dysplasia was coined described the disease and comorbidities. This led to worldwide reductions in supplemental oxygen levels and ventilation pressure, improving the health outcomes of premature infants. The paper has been called "one of the most important, most cited, and influential articles in the history of neonatology".

In 1980, Fujiwara and colleagues reported the first successful use of surfactant replacement therapy to treat neonatal respiratory distress syndrome.

=== Increasing technology ===
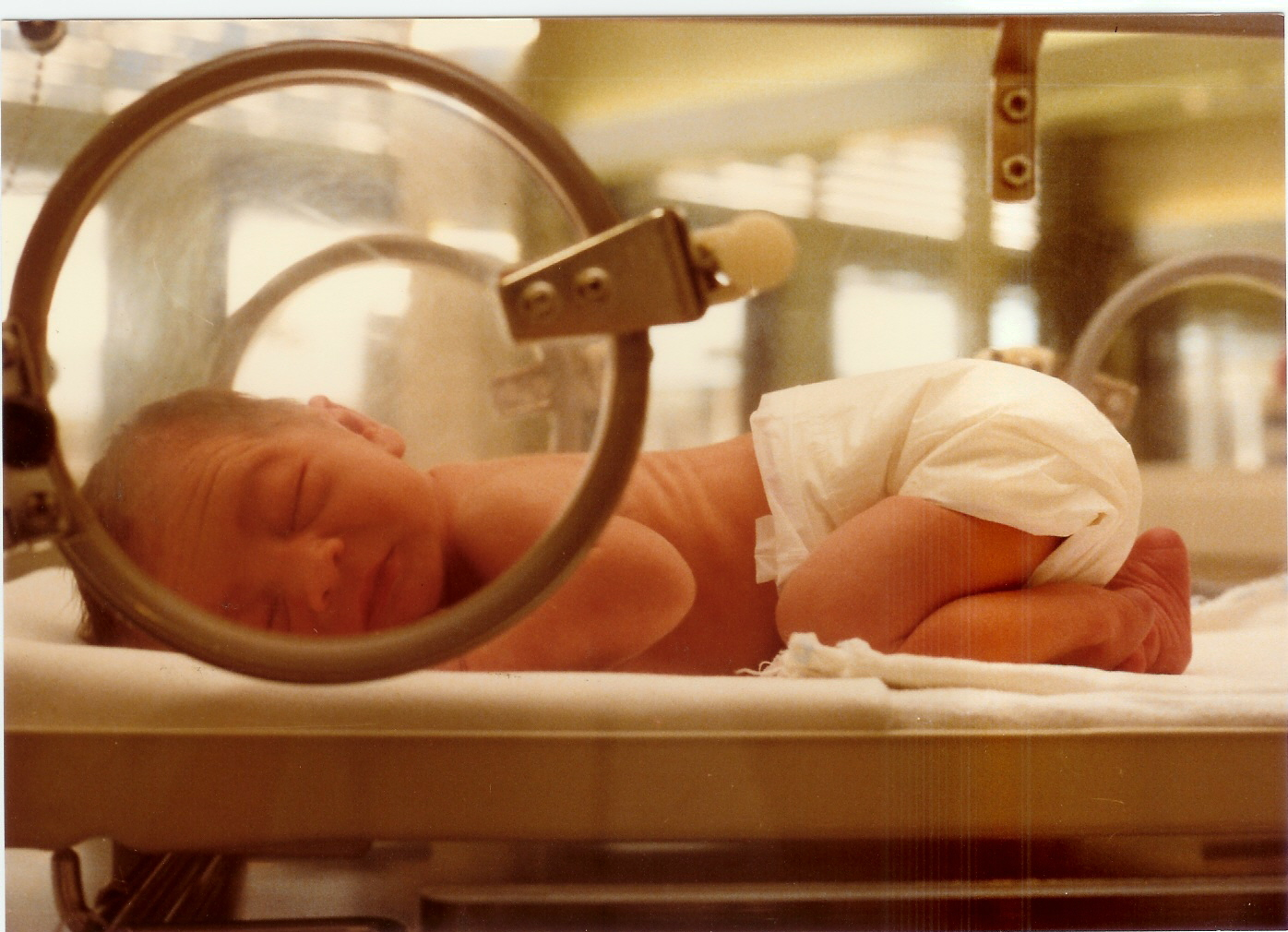
Neonatal intensive-care unit from 1980

By the 1970s, NICUs were an established part of hospitals in the developed world. In Britain, some early units ran community programs, sending experienced nurses to help care for premature babies at home. But increasingly technological monitoring and therapy meant special care for babies became hospital-based. By the 1980s, over 90% of births took place in hospitals. The emergency dash from home to the NICU with the baby in a transport incubator had become a thing of the past, though transport incubators were still needed. Specialist equipment and expertise were not available at every hospital, and strong arguments were made for large, centralized NICUs. On the downside was the long traveling time for frail babies and parents. A 1979 study showed that 20% of babies in NICUs for up to a week were never visited by either parent. Centralized or not, by the 1980s few questioned the role of NICUs in saving babies. Around 80% of babies born weighing less than 1.5 kg now survived, compared to around 40% in the 1960s. From 1982, pediatricians in Britain could train and qualify in the sub-specialty of neonatal medicine.

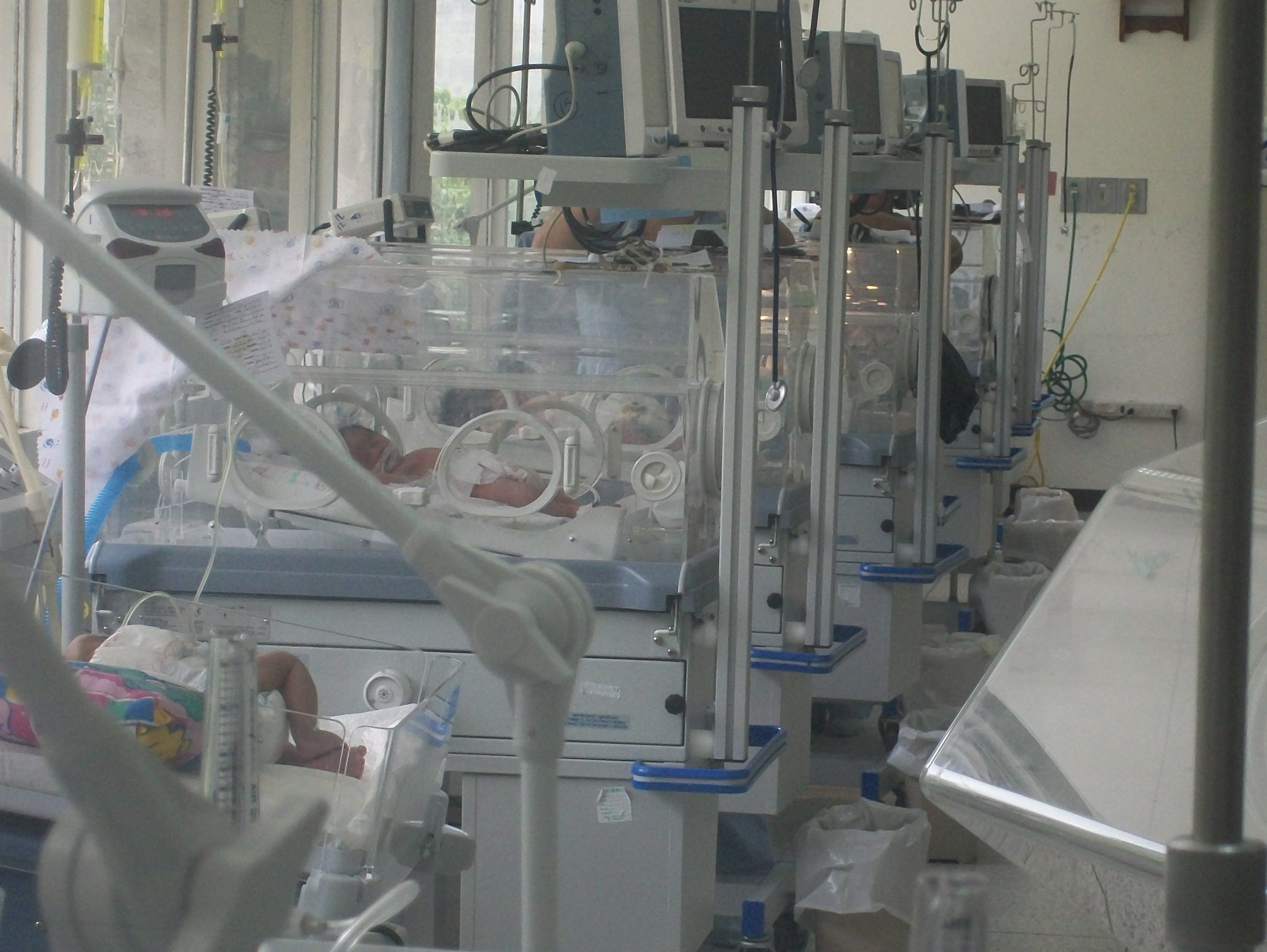
Neonatal intensive-care unit in 2009

Not only careful nursing but also new techniques and instruments now played a major role. As in adult intensive-care units, the use of monitoring and life-support systems became routine. These needed special modification for small babies, whose bodies were tiny and often immature. Adult ventilators, for example, could damage babies' lungs and gentler techniques with smaller pressure changes were devised. The many tubes and sensors used for monitoring the baby's condition, blood sampling and artificial feeding made some babies scarcely visible beneath the technology. Furthermore, by 1975, over 18% of newborn babies in Britain were being admitted to NICUs. Some hospitals admitted all babies delivered by Caesarian section or under 2500 g in weight. The fact that these babies missed early close contact with their mothers was a growing concern. The 1980s saw questions being raised about the human and economic costs of too much technology, and admission policies gradually became more conservative.

=== Changing priorities ===
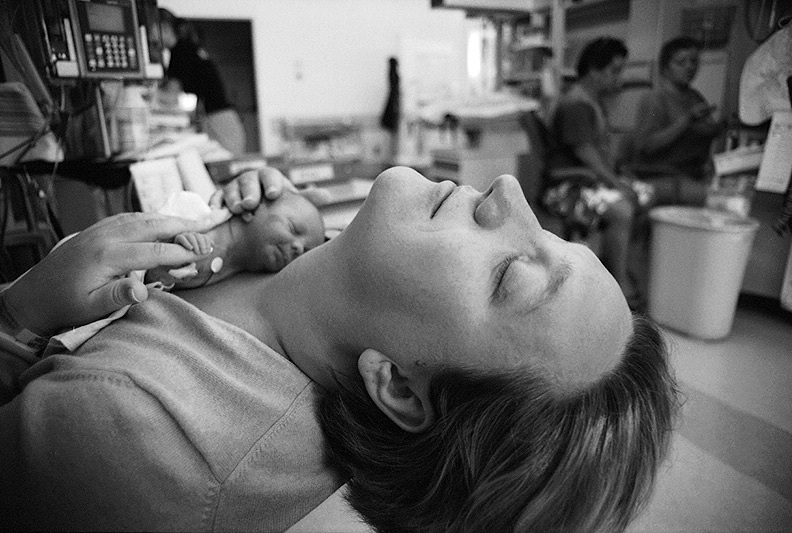
A new mother holds her premature baby at Kapiolani Medical Center NICU in Honolulu, Hawaii

NICUs now concentrate on treating very small, premature, or congenitally ill babies. Some of these babies are from higher-order multiple births, but most are still single babies born too early. Premature labour, and how to prevent it, remains a perplexing problem for doctors. Even though medical advancements allow doctors to save low-birth-weight babies, it is almost invariably better to delay such births.

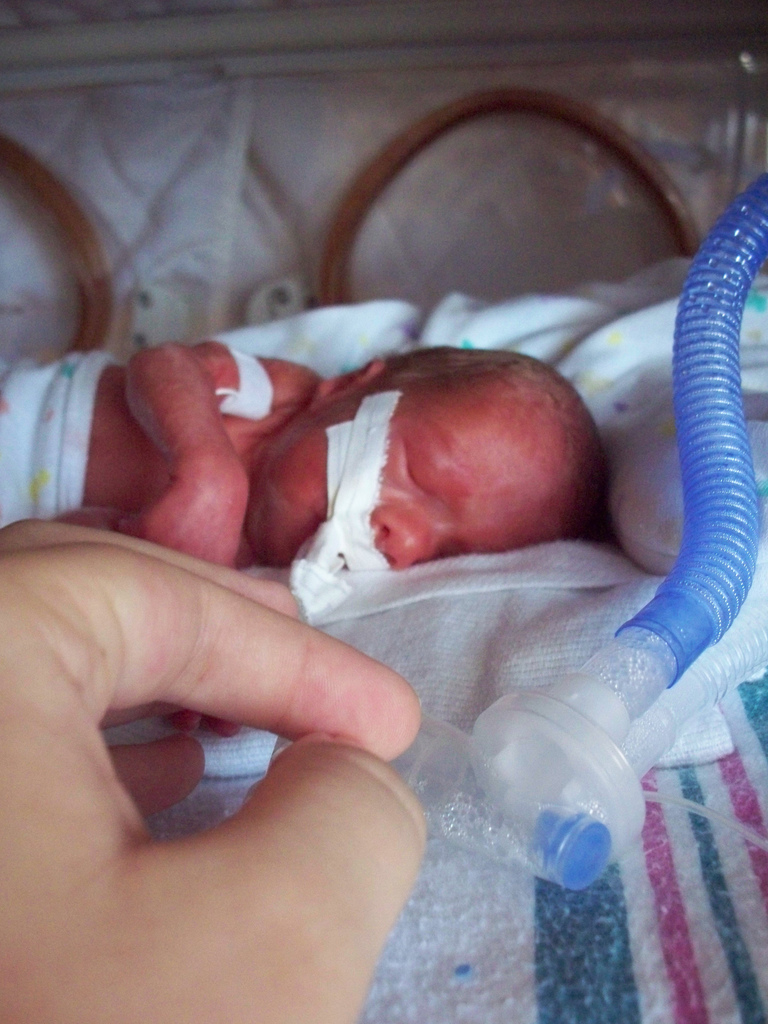
A premature infant weighing 990 grams (35 ounces), intubated and requiring mechanical ventilation in the neonatal intensive-care unit

Over the last 10 years or so, SCBUs have become much more "parent-friendly", encouraging maximum involvement with the babies. Routine gowns and masks are gone and parents are encouraged to help with care as much as possible. Cuddling and skin-to-skin contact, also known as kangaroo care, are seen as beneficial for all but the frailest (very tiny babies are exhausted by the stimulus of being handled; or larger critically ill infants). Less stressful ways of delivering high-technology medicine to tiny patients have been devised: sensors to measure blood oxygen levels through the skin, for example; and ways of reducing the amount of blood taken for tests.

Some major problems of the NICU have almost disappeared. Exchange transfusions, in which all the blood is removed and replaced, are rare now. Rhesus incompatibility (a difference in blood groups) between mother and baby is largely preventable, and was the most common cause for exchange transfusion in the past. However, breathing difficulties, intraventricular hemorrhage, necrotizing enterocolitis and infections still claim many infant lives and are the focus of many new and current research projects.

The long-term outlook for premature babies saved by NICUs has always been a concern. From the early years, it was reported that a higher proportion than normal grew up with disabilities, including cerebral palsy and learning difficulties. Now that treatments are available for many of the problems faced by tiny or immature babies in the first weeks of life, long-term follow-up, and minimising long-term disability, are major research areas.

Besides prematurity and extremely low birth weight, common diseases cared for in a NICU include perinatal asphyxia, major birth defects, sepsis, neonatal jaundice, and infant respiratory distress syndrome due to immaturity of the lungs. In general, the leading cause of death in NICUs is necrotizing enterocolitis. Complications of extreme prematurity may include intracranial hemorrhage, chronic bronchopulmonary dysplasia (and infant respiratory distress syndrome), or retinopathy of prematurity. An infant may spend a day of observation in a NICU or may spend many months there.

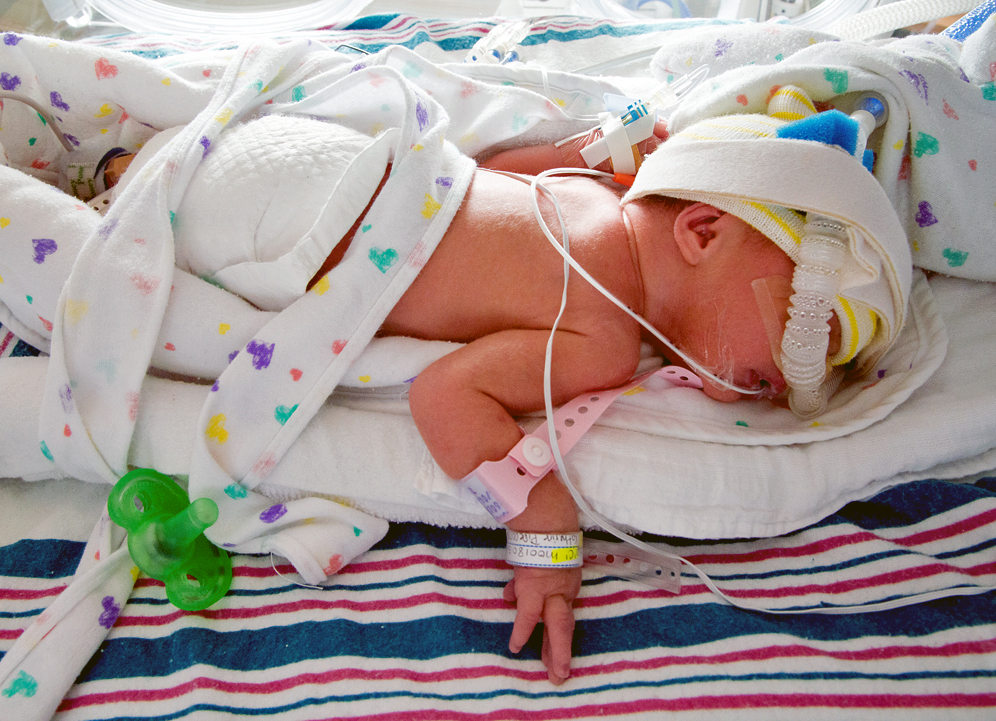
Premature infant in the NICU at McMaster Children's Hospital

Neonatology and NICUs have greatly increased the survival of very low birth weight and extremely premature infants. In the era before NICUs, infants of birth weight less than 1,400 grams (3.1 pounds), usually about 30 weeks gestation, rarely survived. Today, infants of 500 grams (1.1 pounds) at 26 weeks have a fair chance of survival. As of 2022, the world record for the lowest gestational age newborn to survive is held by Curtis Zy-Keith Means, who was born on July 5, 2020, in the United States, at 21 weeks and 1 day gestational age, weighing 420 grams (0.93 pounds).

The NICU environment provides challenges as well as benefits. Stressors for the infants can include continual light, a high level of noise, separation from their mothers, reduced physical contact, painful procedures, and interference with the opportunity to breastfeed. There have been very few studies investigating noise reduction interventions in the NICU and it remains uncertain what their effects could be on babies' growth and development. An NICU can be stressful for the staff as well. A special aspect of NICU stress for both parents and staff is that infants may survive, but with damage to the brain, lungs, or eyes. When parents arrive at the NICU, they will have the availability to tour the unit and orientation to the various areas and equipment. This tour includes information on the different types of equipment used in the NICU, such as incubators, monitors, and ventilators, and how they help to support babies' health and well-being. Parental orientation to the NICU helps reduce parental anxiety and improve satisfaction with care.

Effective communication between health care providers and parents in the NICU is critical for promoting parental involvement and reducing stress. Parents are given information on who their primary point of contact is and how they can communicate with the medical staff caring for their baby.

NICU rotations are essential aspects of pediatric and obstetric residency programs, but NICU experience is encouraged by other specialty residencies, such as family practice, surgery, pharmacy, and emergency medicine.

== Equipment ==
=== Incubator ===
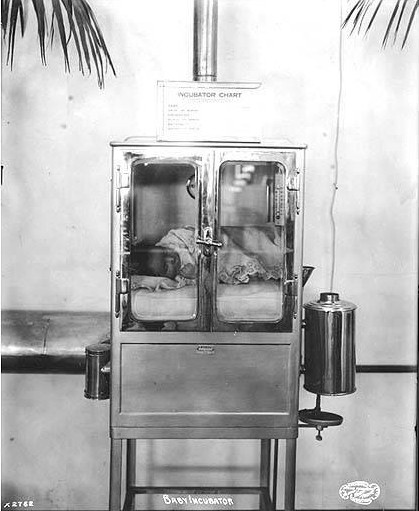
An early incubator, 1909.

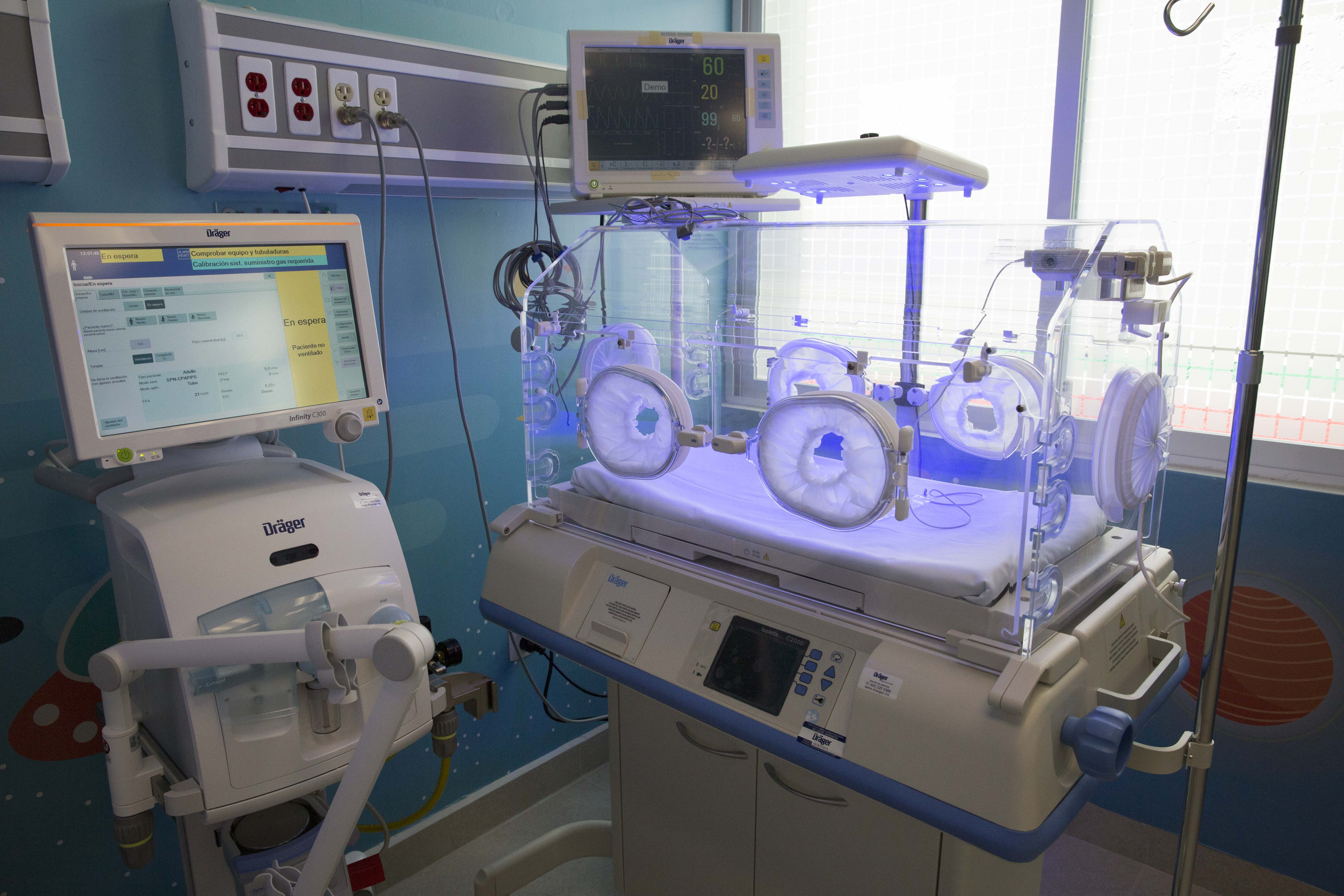
Dräger Isolette C2000 at the Hospital Regional de Apatzingán in Apatzingán, Michoacán, Mexico.

An incubator (or isolette or humidicrib) is an apparatus used to maintain environmental conditions suitable for a neonate (newborn baby). It is used in preterm births or for some ill full-term babies.

Additional items of equipment used to evaluate and treat sick neonates include:

Blood pressure monitor: The blood pressure monitor is a machine connected to a small cuff which is wrapped around the arm or leg of the patient. This cuff automatically takes the blood pressure and displays the data for review by care providers.

Oxygen hood: The oxygen hood is a clear box that fits over the baby's head and supplies oxygen. This is used for babies who can still breathe but need some respiratory support.

Ventilator: This is a breathing machine that delivers air to the lungs. Babies who are severely ill will receive this intervention. Typically, the ventilator takes the role of the lungs while treatment is administered to improve lung and circulatory function.

Possible functions of a neonatal incubator are:

- Oxygenation, through oxygen supplementation by head hood or nasal cannula, or even continuous positive airway pressure (CPAP) or mechanical ventilation. Infant respiratory distress syndrome is the leading cause of death in preterm infants, and the main treatments are CPAP, in addition to administering pulmonary surfactant and stabilizing the blood sugar, blood salts, and blood pressure.
- Observation: Modern neonatal intensive care involves sophisticated measurement of temperature, respiration, cardiac function, oxygenation, and brain activity.
- Protection from cold temperature, infection, noise, drafts and excess handling: Incubators may be described as bassinets enclosed in plastic, with climate control equipment designed to keep them warm and limit their exposure to germs.
- Maintaining fluid balance by providing fluid and keeping a high air humidity to prevent too great a loss from skin and respiratory evaporation.

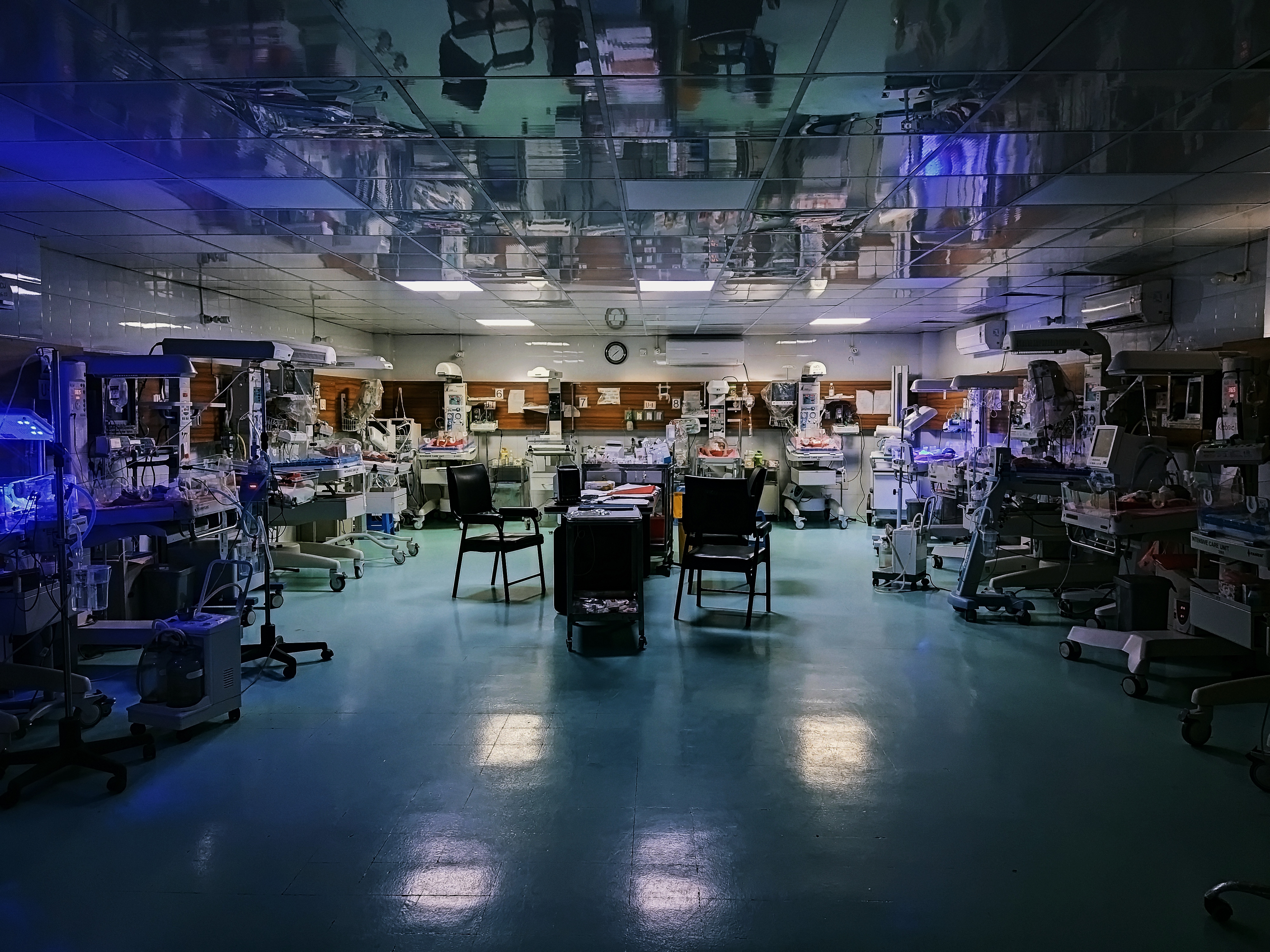
NICU at Sir Salimullah Medical College Hospital in Dhaka, Bangladesh

A transport incubator is an incubator in a transportable form, and is used when a sick or premature baby is moved, e.g., from one hospital to another, as from a community hospital to a larger medical facility with a proper neonatal intensive-care unit. It usually has a miniature ventilator, cardio-respiratory monitor, IV pump, pulse oximeter, and oxygen supply built into its frame.

Extracorporeal Membrane Oxygenation (ECMO)

Extracorporeal membrane oxygenation is used for babies with severe respiratory or cardiac problems. ECMO is typically a last resort when all other treatments have failed. It is an extreme procedure, but significantly improves the life of the newborn.

Two different types of ECMO:

- Venovenous ECMO: Used mostly for lung failure. The blood from the baby is taken from a vein, oxygenated outside the body, and put back through a different vein.
- Venoarterial ECMO: Used for severe heart and lung failure. The blood is taken from a vein, oxygenated outside the body, and put back through an artery to support the heart and lung function.

== Pain management ==
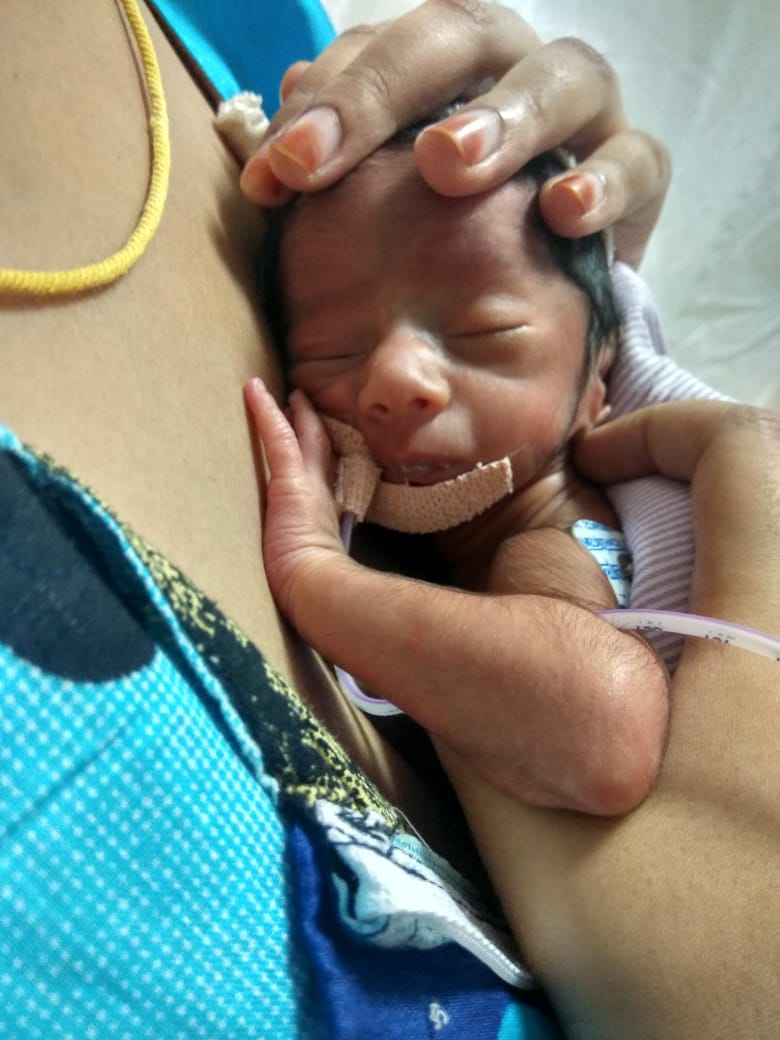
Mother uses the common skin to skin technique with her infant.

In one study, many parents with newborns in the NICU expressed that they would like to learn more about what types of pain their infants are feeling and how they can help relieve it. Another concern mentioned was potential long-term effects of pain.

=== Relieving pain ===
There are multiple ways to manage pain for infants. Holding the infant in kangaroo position or breastfeeding can help calm the baby before a procedure is done. Other methods include allowing the infant to suck on a gloved finger, gently binding the limbs in a flexed position, and creating a quiet and comfortable environment.

== Patient populations ==
Common diagnoses and pathologies in the NICU include:

- Esophageal atresia
- Apnea
- Bradycardia
- Bronchopulmonary dysplasia (BPD)
- Hydrocephalus
- Intraventricular hemorrhage (IVH)
- Jaundice
- Necrotizing enterocolitis (NEC)
- Patent ductus arteriosus (PDA)
- Periventricular leukomalacia (PVL)
- Infant respiratory distress syndrome (RDS)
- Retinopathy of prematurity (ROP)
- Neonatal sepsis
- Transient tachypnea of the newborn (TTN)

== Levels of care ==
The concept of designations for hospital facilities that care for newborn infants according to the level of complexity of care provided was first proposed in the United States in 1976. Levels in the United States are designated by the guidelines published by the American Academy of Pediatrics (AAP). In Britain, the guidelines are issued by the British Association of Perinatal Medicine (BAPM), and in Canada, they are maintained by the Canadian Paediatric Society.

Neonatal care is split into categories or levels of care. These levels apply to the type of care needed and are determined by the governing body of the area.

=== United States ===
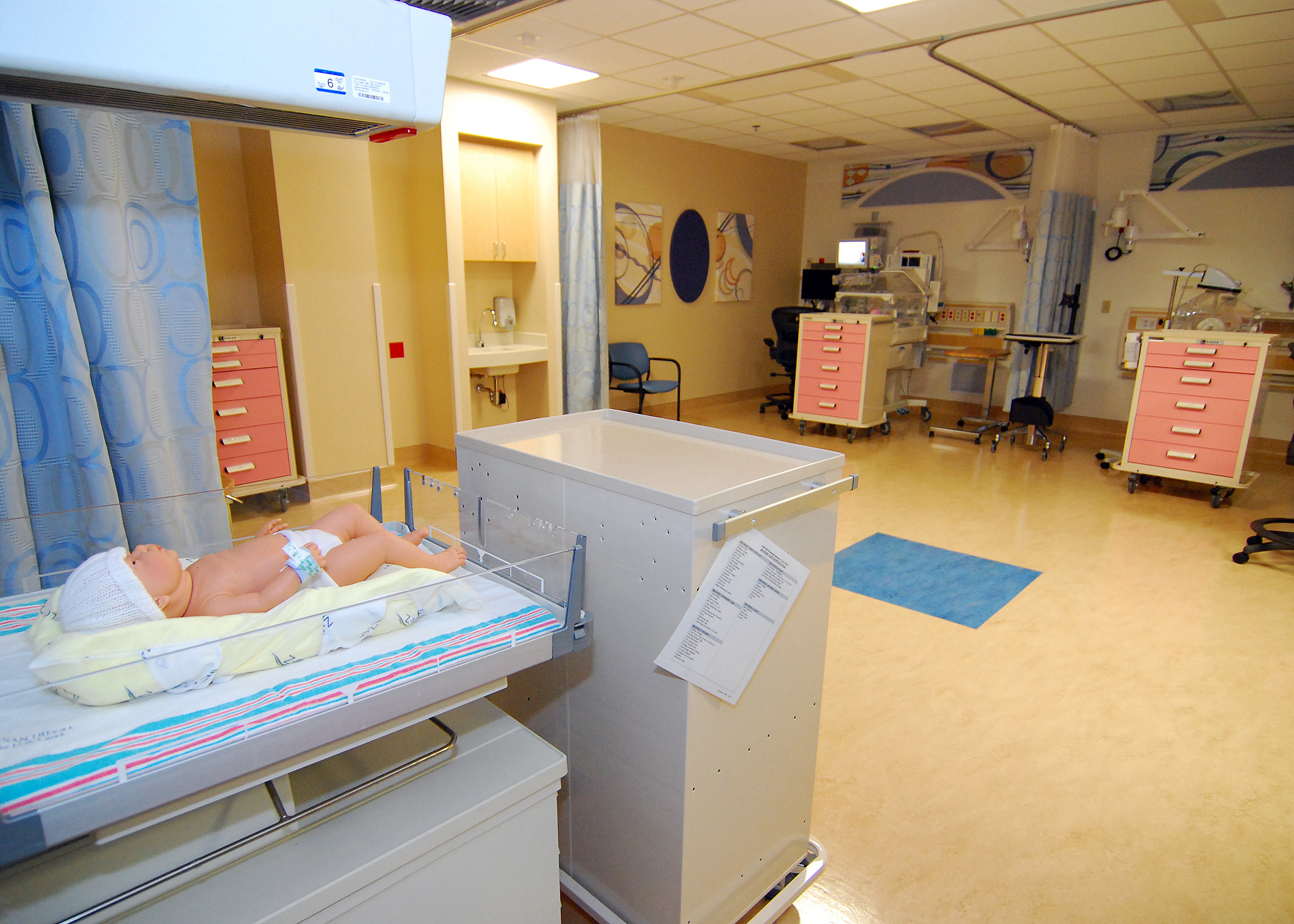
US Navy 090814-N-6326B-001 A mock set-up of the new pod design in the Neonatal Intensive-Care Unit (NICU) at Naval Medical Center San Diego (NMCSD) is on display during an open house

The definition of a neonatal intensive-care unit (NICU) according to the National Center for Statistics is a "hospital facility or unit staffed and equipped to provide continuous mechanical ventilatory support for a newborn infant". In 2012, the American Academy of Pediatrics updated their policy statement delineating the different levels of neonatal care. One major difference in the updated 2012 AAP policy statement compared to the 2004 version is the removal of subspeciality nurseries for levels II and III with the addition of a level IV NICU. The four distinct levels of neonatal care defined in the most recent policy statement from the AAP are:

1. Level I, Well newborn nursery
2. Level II, Special care nursery
3. Level III, Neonatal intensive-care unit (NICU)
4. Level IV, Regional neonatal intensive-care unit (Regional NICU)

==== Level I (well newborn nursery) ====
Level I units are typically referred to as the well baby nursery. Well newborn nurseries have the capability to provide neonatal resuscitation at every delivery; evaluate and provide postnatal care to healthy newborn infants; stabilize and provide care for infants born at 35 to 37 weeks' gestation who remain physiologically stable; and stabilize newborn infants who are ill and those born less than 35 weeks' gestation until transfer to a facility that can provide the appropriate level of neonatal care. Required provider types for well newborn nurseries include pediatricians, family physicians, nurse practitioners, and other advanced practice registered nurses.

==== Level II (special care nursery) ====
Previously, Level II units were subdivided into 2 categories (level IIA & level IIB) on the basis of their ability to provide assisted ventilation including continuous positive airway pressure. Level II units are also known as special care nurseries and have all of the capabilities of a level I nursery. In addition to providing level I neonatal care, Level II units are able to:

- Provide care for infants born ≥32-week gestation and weighing ≥1500 g who have physiologic immaturity or who are moderately ill with problems that are expected to resolve rapidly and are not anticipated to need subspecialty services on an urgent basis
- Provide care for infants who are feeding and growing stronger or convalescing after intensive care
- Provide mechanical ventilation for a brief duration (<24 h) or continuous positive airway pressure
- Stabilize infants born before 32-week gestation and weighing less than 1500 g until transfer to a neonatal intensive-care facility
- Level II nurseries are required to be managed and staffed by a pediatrician, however many Level II special care nurseries are staffed by neonatologists and neonatal nurse practitioners.

==== Level III (neonatal intensive-care unit) ====
The 2004 AAP guidelines subdivided Level III units into 3 categories (level IIIA, IIIB & IIIC). Level III units are required to have pediatric surgeons in addition to care providers required for level II (pediatric hospitalists, neonatologists, and neonatal nurse practitioners) and level I (pediatricians, family physicians, nurse practitioners, and other advanced practice registered nurses). Also, required provider types that must either be on site or at a closely related institution by prearranged consultative agreement include pediatric medical subspecialists, pediatric anesthesiologists, and pediatric ophthalmologists. In addition to providing the care and having the capabilities of level I and level II nurseries, level III neonatal intensive-care units are able to:

- Provide sustained life support
- Provide comprehensive care for infants born <32 wks gestation and weighing <1500 g
- Provide comprehensive care for infants born at all gestational ages and birth weights with critical illness
- Provide prompt and readily available access to a full range of pediatric medical subspecialists, pediatric surgical specialists, pediatric anesthesiologists, and pediatric ophthalmologists
- Provide a full range of respiratory support that may include conventional and/or high-frequency ventilation and inhaled nitric oxide
- Perform advanced imaging, with interpretation on an urgent basis, including computed tomography, MRI, and echocardiography

==== Level IV (regional NICU) ====
The highest level of neonatal care provided occurs at regional NICUs, or Level IV neonatal intensive-care units. Level IV units are required to have pediatric surgical subspecialists in addition to the care providers required for Level III units. Regional NICUs have all of the capabilities of Level I, II, and III units. In addition to providing the highest level of care, level IV NICUs:

- Are located within an institution with the capability to provide surgical repair of complex congenital or acquired conditions
- Maintain a full range of pediatric medical subspecialists, pediatric surgical subspecialists, and pediatric anesthesiologists at the site
- Facilitate transport and provide outreach education.

=== United Kingdom ===
Different criteria are used to designate special and intensive neonatal care locally and nationally.

==== Level 1 Neonatal Units ====
Also known as Special Care Baby Units (SCBU), these look after babies who need more care than healthy newborns but are relatively stable and mature. SCBU might provide tube-feeding, oxygen therapy, antibiotics to treat infection and phototherapy for jaundice. In a SCBU, a nurse can be assigned up to four babies to care for.

==== Level 2 Neonatal Units ====
Also known as Local Neonatal Units, these can look after babies who need more advanced support such as parenteral nutrition and continuous positive airway pressure (CPAP). They may also look after babies who need short-term intensive care such as mechanical ventilation. Babies who will need longer-term or more elaborate intensive care, for example extremely preterm infants, are usually transferred to a Level 3 unit.

Babies in a Level 2 unit may be classified for nursing purposes as Special Care, High Dependency (HDU), in which a nurse will be assigned up to two babies, or Intensive care, where nursing is one-to-one, or sometimes even two-to-one.

==== Level 3 Neonatal Units ====
Also known as Neonatal Intensive Care Units (NICU) – although Level 2 units may also have their own NICU. These look after the smallest, most premature and most unwell babies and often serve a large geographical region. Therapies such as prolonged mechanical ventilation, therapeutic hypothermia, neonatal surgery and inhaled nitric oxide are usually provided in Level 3 Units, although not every unit has access to all therapies. Some babies being cared for in Level 3 units will require less intensive treatment and will be looked after in HDU or SCBU nurseries on the same site. NHS England recommended in December 2019 that these units should care for at least 100 babies weighing less than 1.5 kg, and usually perform more than 2,000 intensive care days per year.

=== India ===
India has a three-tier system based on weight and gestational age of the neonate.

==== Level I care ====
Neonates weighing more than 1800 grams or having gestational maturity of 34 weeks or more are categorized under level I care. The care consists of basic care at birth, provision of warmth, maintaining asepsis and promotion of breastfeeding. This type of care can be given at home, subcenter and primary health centre.

==== Level II care ====
Neonates weighing 1200–1800 grams or having gestational maturity of 30–34 weeks are categorized under level II care and are looked after by trained nurses and pediatricians. The equipment and facilities used for this level of care include equipment for resuscitation, maintenance of thermoneutral environment, intravenous infusion, gavage feeding, phototherapy and exchange blood transfusion. This type of care can be given at first referral units, district hospitals, teaching institutions and nursing homes.

==== Level III care ====
Neonates weighing less than 1200 grams or having gestational maturity of less than 30 weeks are categorized under level III care. The care is provided at apex institutions and regional perinatal centers equipped with centralized oxygen and suction facilities, servo-controlled incubators, vital signs monitors, transcutaneous monitors, ventilators, infusion pumps etc. This type of care is provided by skilled nurses and neonatologists.

== See also ==
- Neonatology
- Pediatric intensive-care unit
- Embrace (organization)
- Neonatal nurse practitioner
- Neonatal nursing
- Bubble CPAP
