= Bronchopulmonary dysplasia =

Chronic lung disease in premature infants

- Other names: BPD; chronic lung disease of prematurity
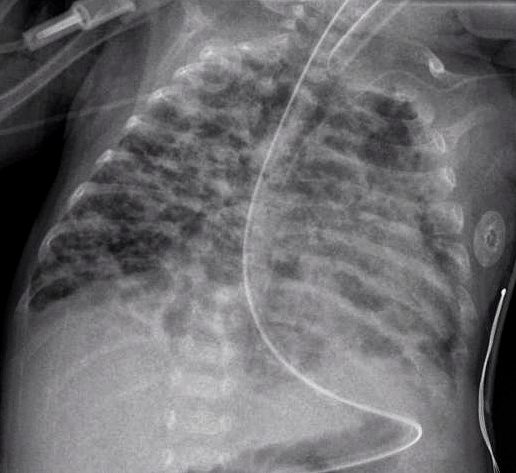
- Chest X-ray of bronchopulmonary dysplasia
- Specialty: Neonatology; pulmonology
- Symptoms: Supplemental oxygen requirement; tachypnea; increased work of breathing
- Complications: Pulmonary hypertension; obstructive lung disease
- Causes: Lung injury, abnormal remodeling, and disrupted lung development
- Risk factors: Prematurity; low birth weight; prolonged mechanical ventilation; oxygen toxicity
- Prognosis: Varies by severity
- Frequency: 0.03%

Bronchopulmonary dysplasia (BPD) is a chronic lung disease of premature infants, characterized by disrupted lung development and/or lung injury. It is the most common complication of prematurity. Acute injury to the premature, developing lung, often resulting from respiratory support required for survival at early gestational ages, may progress to chronic lung injury; this process is influenced by prenatal and perinatal factors, with abnormal repair and remodeling occurring as the lung develops and matures over months to years. The strongest risk factors for BPD are prematurity and low birth weight. It is also more common in infants who require prolonged treatment with supplemental oxygen or mechanical ventilation for respiratory distress syndrome.

The definition of BPD has evolved over time, reflecting changes in the population at risk, such as more survivors at earlier gestational ages and improvements in management including surfactant, antenatal corticosteroids, and less aggressive mechanical ventilation. Clinically, BPD is defined by a persistent need for supplemental oxygen or respiratory support, assessed at 28 days of life or 36 weeks' postmenstrual age, in a preterm infant with radiographic (X-ray) evidence of lung disease. The condition is commonly graded as mild, moderate, or severe (grades 1–3) according to the level of respiratory support required. BPD is associated with significant morbidity and mortality among premature infants. Complications may also extend beyond infancy, particularly in severe BPD, and may include pulmonary hypertension, obstructive lung disease, and poorer neurodevelopmental outcomes.

== Discovery ==
In 1967, radiologist William Northway and pathologists Robert Rosan and David Porter first coined the term "bronchopulmonary dysplasia" to describe a "chronic form of injury to the lungs caused by barotrauma and oxygen injury in preterm infants requiring mechanical ventilation". The disease was first observed three years earlier among premature infants treated with high-concentration oxygen and intermittent positive pressure ventilation, noted by neonatologist Philip Sunshine at Stanford University Medical Center.

== Presentation ==
Bronchopulmonary dysplasia is characterized by a persistent need for supplemental oxygen or respiratory support with clinical and radiographic evidence of parenchymal lung disease. Physical findings commonly include tachypnea and increased work of breathing; coarse breath sounds and wheezing may also be present. Blood gas testing may show chronic carbon dioxide retention. Feeding problems are common in infants with BPD, and may include difficulty swallowing and an increased risk of aspiration.

Chest radiographic (X-ray) findings in BPD vary with disease severity and may change over time. In milder disease, radiographs may show diffuse haziness, coarse interstitial markings, and areas of atelectasis. More severe disease may be associated with hyperexpanded lungs, flattened diaphragms, and heterogeneous areas of atelectasis and scarring. Over time, radiographs may show partial improvement in lung expansion, interstitial thickening, atelectasis, and cystic changes, although residual abnormalities may persist in severe disease.

== Cause ==
Factors associated with BPD
Increased risk	Reduced risk or severity
Prenatal: genetic susceptibility, maternal asthma, male sex; Perinatal: lower gestational age, chorioamnionitis, intrauterine growth restriction; Postnatal: mechanical ventilation, infection, inadequate nutrition	Antenatal corticosteroids; Surfactant therapy; Lung-protective ventilation; Avoidance of hypoxia and hyperoxia; Adequate nutrition

In premature infants, BPD develops when prenatal, perinatal, and postnatal exposures injure an immature lung and alter ongoing lung development. Inflammation, oxidative stress, and hypoxia contribute to acute lung injury, impairing alveolarization, vascularization, and airway growth. After injury, effective repair may allow for continued lung development, whereas abnormal remodeling can lead to chronic lung disease. The pattern of repair and remodeling is reflected in the parenchymal, airway, and vascular phenotypes of BPD. Genetic susceptibility may account for up to 50% of the variation in BPD severity. Inadequate postnatal nutrition may worsen lung injury and limit repair. Bronchopulmonary dysplasia has also been linked to alterations in the Wnt/beta-catenin pathway.

In the initial descriptions of BPD, prolonged high oxygen delivery and mechanical ventilation in premature infants caused necrotizing bronchiolitis and alveolar septal injury, with inflammation and scarring. Since the introduction of surfactant therapy, antenatal corticosteroids, and lung-protective ventilation strategies, a newer concept of BPD has emerged that instead focuses on impaired lung development manifesting as fewer alveoli, impaired septations, and variable interstitial thickening.

== Diagnosis ==
The best way to define BPD is currently debated among experts. The simplest definition of BPD is based solely on whether respiratory support and/or oxygen therapy are required either at 28 days of life or 36 weeks' postmenstrual age. This definition does not account for the severity of disease, but is commonly used as an outcome in clinical trials.

The 2019 National Institute of Child Health and Human Development (US) definition classifies severity of BPD based on the amount and type of respiratory support required at 36 weeks' postmenstrual age:

- No BPD: no respiratory support
- Mild (grade 1): nasal cannula ≤2 L/min
- Moderate (grade 2): nasal cannula >2 L/min or non-invasive positive pressure ventilation
- Severe (grade 3): invasive mechanical ventilation

=== Earlier criteria ===
Since the term "bronchopulmonary dysplasia" was coined in 1967, several sets of criteria have been proposed. In 1979, BPD was defined by an oxygen requirement at 28 days of life, persistent chest radiograph abnormalities, and tachypnea with rales or retractions. In 1989, the Maternal and Child Health Bureau (US) proposed the following diagnostic criteria:

1. Positive pressure ventilation during the first two weeks of life for a minimum of three days.
2. Clinical signs of abnormal respiratory function.
3. Requirements for supplemental oxygen for longer than 28 days of age to maintain P_{a}O_{2} above 50 mm Hg.
4. Chest radiograph with diffuse abnormal findings characteristic of bronchopulmonary dysplasia.

The 2006 National Institutes of Health (US) criteria for BPD (for neonates treated with >21% oxygen for at least 28 days) were:

- Mild:
  - Breathing room air at 36 weeks' postmenstrual age or discharge for babies born before 32 weeks, or
  - Breathing room air by 56 days' postnatal age or discharge for babies born after 32 weeks' gestation
- Moderate:
  - Need for <30% oxygen at 36 weeks' postmenstrual age or discharge for babies born before 32 weeks, or
  - Need for <30% oxygen to 56 days' postnatal age or discharge for babies born after 32 weeks' gestation
- Severe:
  - Need for >30% oxygen, with or without positive pressure ventilation or continuous positive pressure at 36 weeks' postmenstrual age or discharge for babies born before 32 weeks, or
  - Need for >30% oxygen with or without positive pressure ventilation or continuous positive pressure at 56 days' postnatal age or discharge for babies born after 32 weeks' gestation

== Management ==
Management of BPD varies by disease phase (early, evolving, established) and severity (mild, moderate, severe). Broadly, this may include early preventive strategies during the first week of life, treatment of evolving disease before assessment at 36 weeks' postmenstrual age, and long-term care for established BPD after diagnosis.

=== Early prevention ===
Management of BPD begins with strategies to prevent lung injury in preterm infants. These include minimizing intubation and mechanical ventilation when possible, and using lung-protective ventilation; lung-protective ventilation aims to reduce volutrauma (injury from excessive lung inflation), barotrauma (injury from excessive airway pressure), and oxygen-related lung injury. Oxygen therapy is adjusted to avoid both hypoxemia and oxygen toxicity.

Adequate nutrition is required to maintain lung growth and repair after birth. Infants with BPD often require increased energy intake to support growth and compensate for the increased work of breathing. Human breast milk feeding is associated with a lower risk of BPD in preterm infants.

Caffeine, usually given as caffeine citrate, is used to treat apnea of prematurity and may also help prevent BPD. Early administration, within the first three days of life, is associated with improved extubation success, shorter duration of mechanical ventilation, and improved lung function.

Vitamin A treatment in low birth weight babies may improve the 36-week mortality risk, decrease the days of mechanical ventilation, and decrease the incidence of BPD. Use of vitamin A is limited by the small size of the clinical benefit and the need for repeated painful intramuscular injections. It is not clear if treatment with superoxide dismutase supplementation is effective at preventing BPD or reducing mortality in preterm infants.

There is evidence that steroids like dexamethasone (systemic corticosteroid treatment) given to babies less than seven days old can prevent BPD. However, this treatment increases the risk of neurodevelopmental sequelae (e.g., cerebral palsy) and gastrointestinal perforation.

=== Evolving BPD ===
Evolving BPD refers to the phase of disease after the first week of life and before assessment at 36 weeks' postmenstrual age. Respiratory management involves maintaining respiratory stability while avoiding prolonged intubation; non-invasive respiratory support (e.g., nasal CPAP) is preferred when possible.

For babies seven days old and older, "late systemic postnatal corticosteroid treatment" may reduce the risk of death and of BPD. There is some evidence that this treatment does not increase the risk of cerebral palsy; however, long-term studies considering the neurodevelopmental outcomes is needed to further understand the risk of this treatment option. Late systemic postnatal corticosteroid treatment is therefore generally reserved for babies seven days old or older who cannot be taken off of a ventilator. The benefits and risks of systemic corticosteroid treatment in older babies who are not intubated (on a ventilator) are not known.

Some infants with BPD may be treated with diuretics that decrease excess fluid in the lungs or with bronchodilators that relax the airway muscles to facilitate breathing. The use of diuretics and bronchodilators varies significantly between centers. Diuretic therapy is generally limited to infants with pulmonary edema or fluid overload who show clinical improvement with treatment. Bronchodilators have not been shown to reduce BPD or mortality, but may be used in selected infants with severe BPD who have asthma-like symptoms or reversible airway obstruction.

Hypercarbia (too much carbon dioxide [CO_{2}] in the blood) may contribute to the development of BPD. In neonatal intensive care, CO_{2} monitoring is used to avoid both hypercarbia and hypocarbia (too little CO_{2} in the blood). Carbon dioxide can be monitored by taking a blood sample (arterial blood gas), through exhaled breath using capnography, or continuously through the skin using noninvasive transcutaneous CO_{2} monitors. The most effective and safest approach for measuring CO_{2} in newborn infants is not clear.

=== Established BPD ===
For infants with established BPD at 36 weeks' postmenstrual age, ongoing management may involve prevention of respiratory infections, monitoring for cardiorespiratory complications, and long-term respiratory support, depending on disease severity. Home oxygen therapy may be used after discharge in those with persistently low oxygen levels. Infants who develop severe BPD may require multidisciplinary care for long-term respiratory support, including tracheostomy and chronic mechanical ventilation. Infants with moderate or severe BPD may also be evaluated for pulmonary hypertension, commonly with echocardiography.

Infection prevention is important for infants and children with BPD because of their increased risk of respiratory tract infections. RSV prophylaxis and influenza vaccination have both been shown to reduce morbidity and rehospitalization in this population.

== Epidemiology ==
The rate of BPD varies among institutions, which may reflect neonatal risk factors, care practices (e.g., target levels for acceptable oxygen saturation), and differences in the clinical definitions of BPD. Cohort studies from around the world report a BPD prevalence of 11–50% among preterm infants; this wide range is largely attributable to differences in the specific criteria used for diagnosis. BPD is the most common complication of prematurity and appears to be increasing in prevalence, likely reflecting improved overall survival among extremely preterm infants.

The incidence of BPD increases with decreasing gestational age and with decreasing birth weight. Approximately 80% of infants born at 22–24 weeks' gestation are diagnosed with BPD, compared with about 20% of those born at 28 weeks' gestation. Among infants with BPD, 95% have very low birth weight.

Incidence (Note: Defined as supplemental oxygen requirement at 36 weeks' postmenstrual age.) of BPD by gestational age (2003–2007)
Gestational age (weeks)	22	23	24	25	26	27	28
Incidence	85%	73%	69%	55%	44%	34%	23%

== Outcomes ==
Severe bronchopulmonary dysplasia is associated with significant morbidity and mortality, although outcomes vary between countries and institutions. Pulmonary hypertension, respiratory failure, and infection (pneumonia, sepsis) are the most common causes of death among infants with severe BPD. Among children with a history of BPD, approximately 50% are rehospitalized at least once before age 2, most often for respiratory viral infections such as respiratory syncytial virus (RSV), influenza, or rhinovirus. During the preschool and school-age years, affected children have higher rates of asthma-like symptoms, including wheezing, cough, airway hyperreactivity, and shortness of breath with exercise.

BPD is also associated with poorer neurodevelopmental outcomes, even in the absence of definite brain injury. Compared to premature infants without BPD, those with BPD have higher rates of motor impairment, delayed cognitive development, and later academic difficulties.

Although BPD generally improves with age, it can have lifelong respiratory consequences. Its long-term effects in older children and adults remain poorly understood, particularly because advances in neonatal care have altered the clinical and pathologic characteristics of the disease.

Phenotypes in adult survivors have been broadly categorized as "predominantly asthma-like, emphysematous, or consistent with pulmonary hypertension". Adult survivors may also develop obstructive lung disease, contributing to reduced lung function and an increased risk of chronic obstructive pulmonary disease (COPD).

== See also ==
- Health outcomes for adults born prematurely
- Iatrogenesis
- Respiratory distress syndrome
- Wilson–Mikity syndrome
- Pulmonary fibrosis
