= Verder =

Verder may refer to:

== People ==
- Adah Elizabeth Verder (1900−1997), American medical bacteriologist
- Henrik Verder (born 1942), Danish pediatrician

== Other uses ==
- Verder (album)
