= Darryl B. Hood =

American environmental neuroscientist

- Born: 1958 (age 67–68); North Carolina
- Education: East Tennessee State University
- Known for: Environmental neurotoxicology
- Scientific career
- Fields: Neurotoxicology
- Workplaces: The Ohio State University

Darryl Brice Hood is an American toxicologist, environmental public health scientist, and academic whose research examines developmental neurotoxicology, environmental justice, and disparities in health outcomes. He is a professor in the Division of Environmental Health Sciences at the Ohio State University College of Public Health.

Hood is the co-architect of the Public Health Exposome framework. His earlier research examined the neurodevelopmental effects of prenatal exposure to polycyclic aromatic hydrocarbons (PAHs), particularly benzo[a]pyrene, while his later work has emphasized community-level exposomics and environmental public health disparities.

== Early life ==
He was born in 1958 in North Carolina. The oldest of three children who were raised by parents heavily involved in church during the Civil Rights Movement, Hood was a plaintiff in the later case Swann vs. Charlotte-Mecklenburg Board of Education, aimed at speeding up the racial integration of public schools.

Hood graduated with a bachelor's science degree in biology and chemistry from Johnson C. Smith University and received his Ph.D. from East Tennessee State University in 1990. Soon after, Dr. Hood began research and served as a member of the faculty at Meharry Medical College from 1993 to 2013. Hood completed his postdoctoral studies at Vanderbilt University School of Medicine at the Center in Molecular Toxicology. Dr. Hood has also mentored over 15 MSPH/MPH, 15-PhD, and 9-Postdoctoral fellowships.

== Career ==
Hood began his academic career at Meharry Medical College in 1994, progressing from assistant professor to professor before leaving in 2013. He also held an adjunct appointment at Vanderbilt University and led the National Institute of Environmental Health Sciences-funded Advanced Research Cooperation in Environmental Health (ARCH) program as principal investigator. In 2013, Hood joined the Ohio State University College of Public Health as an associate professor of environmental health sciences and was promoted to professor in 2021. In 2023, Hood was appointed to the National Advisory Environmental Health Sciences Council, which advises federal health agencies on environmental health research, training, and funding. In 2024, he was elected to the Society of Toxicology Council for the 2024–2027 term, serving as its contact for the Awards Committee and the Education and Experiential Opportunities Committee.

== Research ==
=== Developmental neurotoxicology ===
Hood's early research examined the effects of prenatal exposure to environmental contaminants, particularly benzo[a]pyrene and other polycyclic aromatic hydrocarbons, on neurological development. His laboratory used inhalation models to investigate how these exposures affect gene expression, neuronal signaling, learning, memory, and sensory processing. A 2012 study by Hood and colleagues, published in Toxicological Sciences, reported changes in object discrimination following prenatal benzo[a]pyrene exposure. His research on the reproductive and neurodevelopmental toxicity of benzo[a]pyrene was also cited in the U.S. Environmental Protection Agency's Integrated Risk Information System assessment of the compound.

=== Public Health Exposome ===
Hood helped develop the Public Health Exposome framework, described in 2014, which examines how environmental, social, behavioral, and biological factors interact to influence health outcomes across populations. The framework combines geospatial analysis and computational methods to study environmental exposures and health disparities. Hood has also discussed the approach on the Adverse Reactions podcast, describing a database of approximately 25,000 environmental factors and variables used in this research.

=== Community-level exposomics ===
Hood and his collaborators developed a community-level exposomics approach to examine how environmental and social conditions affect population health. The approach combines geospatial data, public-health surveillance, environmental monitoring, and social determinants of health to assess community vulnerability and health disparities. His computational research has also applied machine learning and graph analysis to investigate health outcomes, including lung cancer mortality and cardiovascular disease.

=== Environmental ===
After joining Ohio State University, Hood expanded his research on environmental justice and community-based participatory research through the Public Health Exposome framework. His work in Columbus, Ohio, has examined how air pollution, transportation, housing, heat exposure, and social conditions contribute to health disparities. He has also worked with residents and community organizations to assess environmental hazards and communicate health risks.

Hood's collaborative research has investigated environmental and social factors associated with cardiovascular disease, diabetes, obesity, hypertension, and gynecological cancers. In 2025, The Columbus Dispatch featured his work in coverage of efforts to address health disparities linked to redlining and other structural conditions. He has served as president of Minority Professional Consortium for Environmental Impacted Communities, LLC (MPCEIC), since 2001.

=== East Palestine train derailment research ===
Hood has participated in the federal research response to the 2023 Ohio train derailment in East Palestine, Ohio. The National Institute of Environmental Health Sciences identified him as a special consultant to the East Palestine (Ohio) Train Derailment Health Research Program (EPTDHRP) and the East Palestine Research Integrated Collaborative.

In that role, Hood has contributed expertise in neurotoxicology and community-based environmental public health research to studies examining the long-term health consequences of the derailment. The broader research program was developed to investigate exposures and physical and mental health outcomes following the release of hazardous chemicals in the 2023 accident.

== Awards and honors ==
- 2020-Cell Mentor’s “1,000 Inspiring Black Scientists in America”.
- 2022- Ruth C. Bailey Endowed Fund Award for Multicultural Engagement from Ohio State University
