= Wilson syndrome =

Wilson syndrome may refer to:

- Wilson's temperature syndrome
- Wilson's disease
- Mowat–Wilson syndrome
- Wilson–Mikity syndrome
- Wilson–Turner syndrome
