= Henrik Verder =

Danish pediatrician

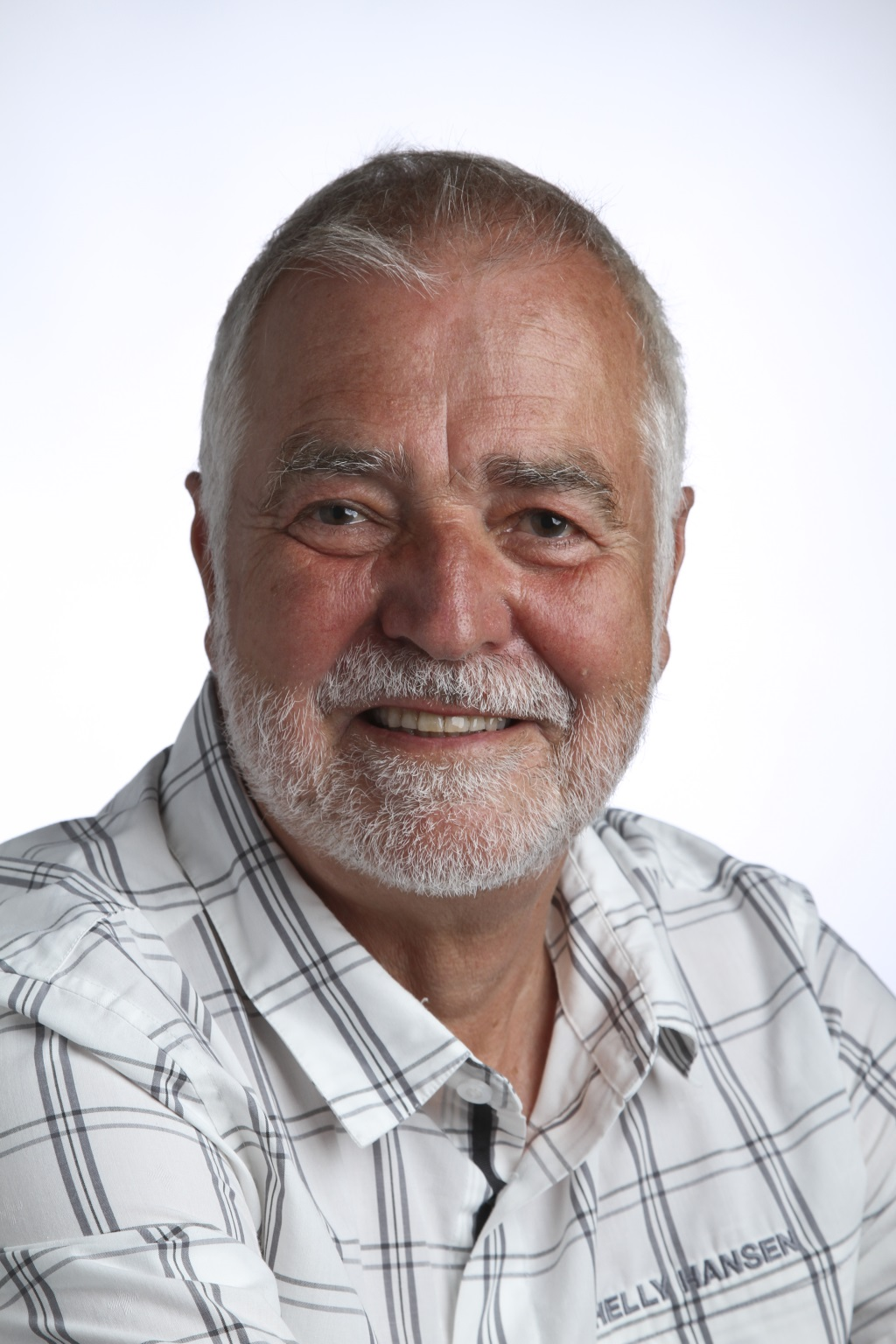
- Born: 1942 (age 83–84); Denmark
- Education: PhD
- Occupation: Paediatrician
- Employer(s): Holbaek University Hospital, Denmark
- Title: MD

Henrik Verder (born 1942) is a pediatrician and the inventor of the INSURE (Intubation Surfactant Extubation) and LISA (Less Invasive Surfactant Administration) methods combined with nasal CPAP (Continuous Positive Airway Pressure). In 1989 he used this pioneering method to successfully treat the first premature infant with severe RDS. Verder is a significant researcher within the field of paediatrics, with more than 50 publications and over 500 citations.

== Biography ==
Verder received his medical degree from Copenhagen University in 1968 and went on to specialise in paediatrics in 1978, concentrating on prenatal determination of lung maturity and prevention of RDS (Infant Respiratory Distress Syndrome). In 1980 he was awarded his medical doctorate from Copenhagen University for his thesis on "Prenatal determination of lung maturity and prevention of RDS".

== Career ==
In 1972 Verder began his associated professorship at Copenhagen University where he went on to become a Professor of Paediatrics and Neonatology. In 1989, at Holbaek Hospital, Verder was the first physician to successfully combine nasal CPAP and surfactant to treat an infant with severe RDS (28 weeks). This unique method was later named INSURE by Mats Blennow et al. The full method was first published in 1992 along with the first documentation of infants treated with surfactant via a small diameter tube. Egbert Herting has since described this method as 'Less Invasive Surfactant Administration (LISA)'. In addition surfactant administration via a laryngeal mask was described for the first time in 1992. The introduction of CPAP in the treatment of RDS more than halved the mortality rate of RDS – reducing mortality from an estimated 50% to 20%. CPAP, when combined with the use of surfactant (INSURE), halved the mortality rate once again, lowering it to approximately 10%. Early treatment of premature infants with RDS using the nasal CPAP and surfactant (INSURE) method is today considered the Global Gold standard of care.

Alongside his clinical achievements, Verder has also been actively involved in improving childcare and in 1975 he took the position of consultant for "Glostrup Observation Home" an institution for observation and treatment of neglected infants and toddlers. In 1998 Verder began working with Professor Bo Sun at Fudan University, Shanghai, to improve neonatal care across China. As a part of this initiative he has visited more than 50 hospitals across 25 provinces and given lectures on the prevention and treatment of RDS, nutrition of pre-term and newborn infants and mother child attachment. Alongside his contributions to Copenhagen University and his work in China, Verder also took the position of Co-chairman at Save the Children Denmark from 1990 to 1993. In this position, together with secretary-general Kristian Sørensen and lawyer Hanne Jensbo from Save the Children Denmark, he spearheaded the opening of Romanian orphanages after the fall of Ceaucescu in 1989. Verder was also involved in several initiatives, which supported the Romanian healthcare system. In 2011 Verder became a member of the steering committee of "The Family Center" directed by Dr. May Olofsson, Hvidovre University Hospital, Copenhagen. An organisation that treats infants and mothers suffering from sequelae, caused by alcohol and drug addiction during pregnancy.

== The INSURE Method ==
Verder is the inventor and pioneer of the INSURE method, a very effective approach to managing preterm neonates with respiratory distress. The method itself has been shown to successfully decrease the use of mechanical ventilation and lower the incidence of bronchopulmonary dysplasia (BPD). The first randomised study on the INSURE method was published in 1994 and a second randomised study in infants less than 30 weeks gestation was published by the group in 1999. In the last 15 years Verder has worked with lung maturity diagnostics on gastric aspirates obtained at birth. By combining this diagnostic method with INSURE, Verder has worked to further improve the clinical outcome of RDS. The lung maturity tests used have been the microbubble test, lamellar body counts (LBC) and measurements of lecithin-sphingomyelin ratio (L/S) with chemometrics, involving a collaboration with Agnar Höskuldsson.
