= Development of the respiratory system =

Embryonic development of human respiratory system

Development of the respiratory system begins early in the fetus. It is a complex process that includes many structures, most of which arise from the endoderm. Towards the end of development, the fetus can be observed making breathing movements. Until birth, however, the mother provides all of the oxygen to the fetus as well as removes all of the fetal carbon dioxide via the placenta.

== Timeline ==
The development of the respiratory system begins at about week 4 of gestation. By week 28, enough alveoli have matured that a baby born prematurely at this time can usually breathe on its own. The respiratory system, however, is not fully developed until early childhood, when a full complement of mature alveoli is present.

=== Weeks 4-7 ===
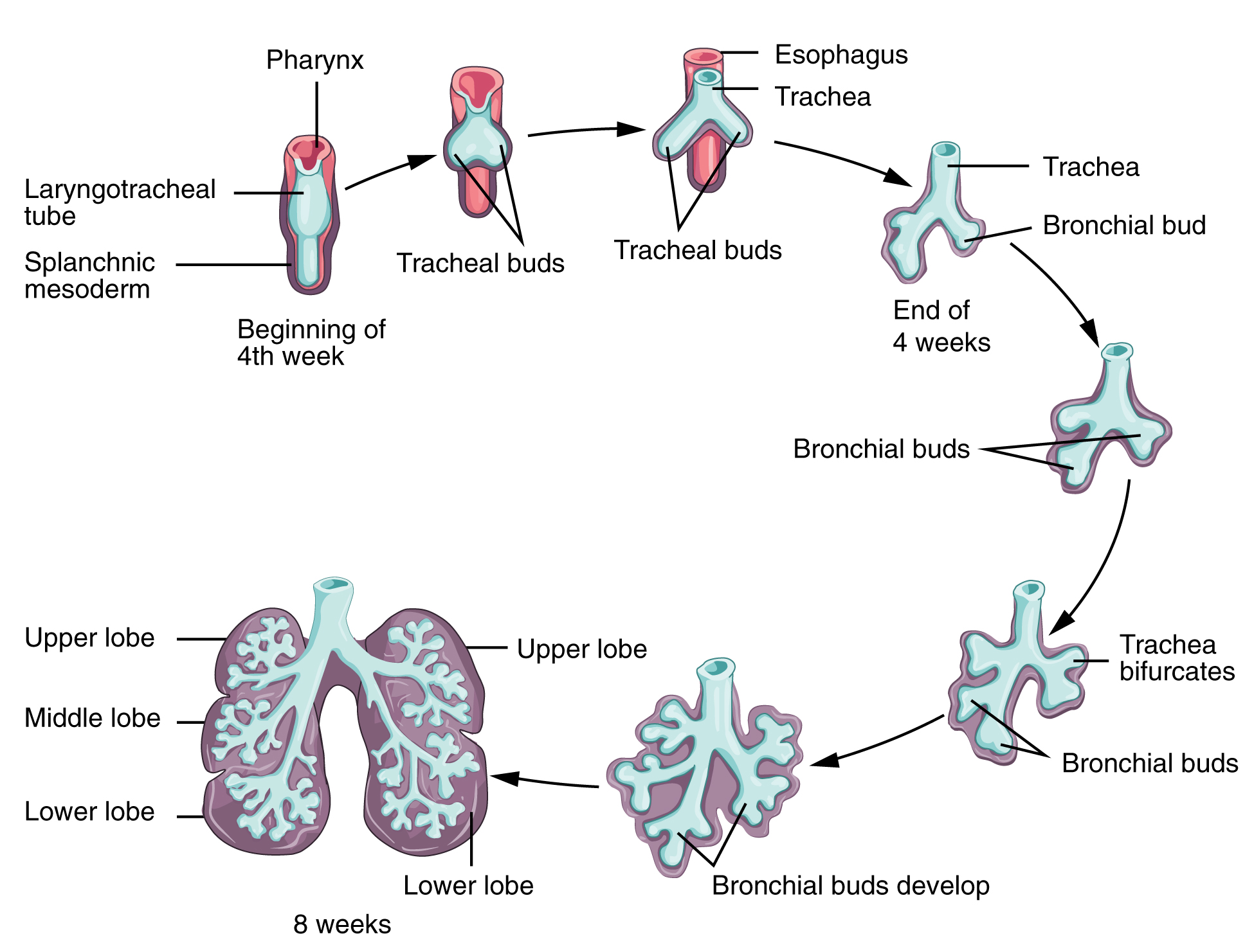
Development of the lower respiratory system

Respiratory development in the embryo begins around week 4. Ectodermal tissue from the anterior head region invaginates posteriorly to form olfactory pits, which fuse with endodermal tissue of the developing pharynx. An olfactory pit is one of a pair of structures that will enlarge to become the nasal cavity. At about this same time, the lung bud forms. The lung bud is a dome-shaped structure composed of tissue that bulges from the foregut. The foregut is endoderm just inferior to the pharyngeal pouches. The laryngotracheal bud is a structure that forms from the longitudinal extension of the lung bud as development progresses. The portion of this structure nearest the pharynx becomes the trachea, whereas the distal end becomes more bulbous, forming bronchial buds. A bronchial bud is one of a pair of structures that will eventually become the bronchi and all other lower respiratory structures.

=== Weeks 7-16 ===
Bronchial buds continue to branch as development progresses until all of the segmental bronchi have been formed. Beginning around week 13, the lumens of the bronchi begin to expand in diameter. By week 16, respiratory bronchioles form. The fetus now has all major lung structures involved in the airway.

=== Weeks 16-24 ===
Once the respiratory bronchioles form, further development includes extensive vascularization, or the development of the blood vessels, as well as the formation of alveolar ducts and alveolar precursors. At about week 19, the respiratory bronchioles have formed. In addition, cells lining the respiratory structures begin to differentiate to form type I and type II pneumocytes. Once type II cells have differentiated, they begin to secrete small amounts of pulmonary surfactant. Around week 20, fetal breathing movements may begin.

=== Weeks 24-term ===
Major growth and maturation of the respiratory system occurs from week 24 until term. More alveolar precursors develop, and larger amounts of pulmonary surfactant are produced. Surfactant levels are not generally adequate to create effective lung compliance until about the eighth month of pregnancy. The respiratory system continues to expand, and the surfaces that will form the respiratory membrane develop further. At this point, pulmonary capillaries have formed and continue to expand, creating a large surface area for gas exchange. The major milestone of respiratory development occurs at around week 28, when sufficient alveolar precursors have matured so that a baby born prematurely at this time can usually breathe on its own. However, alveoli continue to develop and mature into childhood. A full complement of functional alveoli does not appear until around 8 years of age.

== Fetal breathing ==
Although the function of fetal breathing movements is not entirely clear, they can be observed starting at 20–21 weeks of development. Fetal breathing movements involve muscle contractions that cause the inhalation of amniotic fluid and exhalation of the same fluid, with pulmonary surfactant and mucus. Fetal breathing movements are not continuous and may include periods of frequent movements and periods of no movements. Maternal factors can influence the frequency of breathing movements. For example, high blood glucose levels, called hyperglycemia, can boost the number of breathing movements. Conversely, hypoglycemia can reduce the number of fetal breathing movements. Tobacco use is also known to lower fetal breathing rates. Fetal breathing may help tone the muscles in preparation for breathing movements once the fetus is born. It may also help the alveoli to form and mature. Fetal breathing movements are considered a sign of robust health.

== Birth ==
Prior to birth, the lungs are filled with amniotic fluid, mucus, and surfactant. As the fetus is squeezed through the birth canal, the fetal thoracic cavity is compressed, expelling much of this fluid. Some fluid remains, however, but is rapidly absorbed by the body shortly after birth. The first inhalation occurs within 10 seconds after birth and not only serves as the first inspiration, but also acts to inflate the lungs. Pulmonary surfactant is critical for inflation to occur, as it reduces the surface tension of the alveoli. Preterm birth around 26 weeks frequently results in severe respiratory distress, although with current medical advancements, some babies may survive. Prior to 26 weeks, sufficient pulmonary surfactant is not produced, and the surfaces for gas exchange have not formed adequately; therefore, survival is low.

== Sources ==
This article incorporates text from a free content work. Licensed under CC BY 4.0. Text taken from 22.7 Embryonic development of the respiratory system, J. Gordon Betts et al, Openstax Anatomy and Physiology.
