= Necrotizing bronchiolitis =

Medical condition

Necrotizing bronchiolitis is an acute inflammatory lesion of the lower airway, a potential complication of mechanical ventilation.
