= Adah Elizabeth Verder =

American medical bacteriologist and science administrator

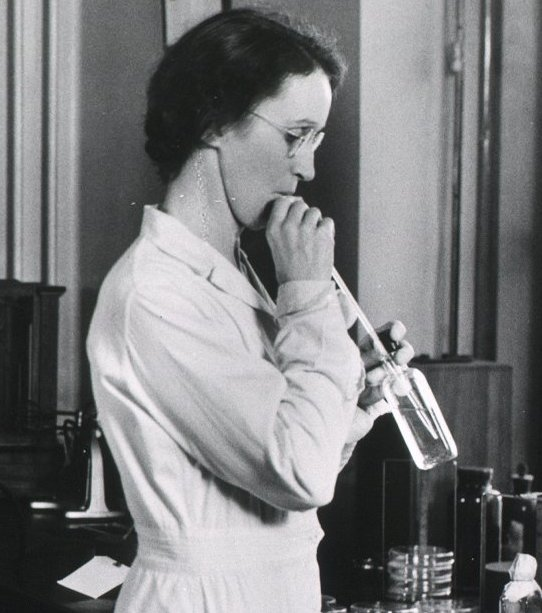
- Born: June 18, 1900; Davenport, Iowa, US
- Died: August 28, 1997 (aged 97); Arlington Heights, Illinois, US
- Education: University of Chicago
- Scientific career
- Fields: Medical bacteriology
- Workplaces: University of Chicago; George Washington University; National Institute of Allergy and Infectious Diseases; University of Texas Medical School
- Thesis: Effect of Diets Deficient in Vitamin A or B on Resistance to Paratyphoid-Enteritidis Organisms (1928)
- Doctoral advisor: Sara Branham Matthews

Adah Elizabeth Verder (June 18, 1900 − August 28, 1997) was an American medical bacteriologist and science administrator. She was a researcher in the National Institute of Allergy and Infectious Diseases' (NIAID) intramural research program specialized in gastrointestinal flora and staphylococci, pseudomonas, and pleuropneumonia organisms. Verder later served as chief of the bacteriology and mycology branch in the extramural division of NIAID. She was a fellow of several societies including the American Association for the Advancement of Science, American Public Health Association, American Academy of Microbiology, and the New York Academy of Sciences.

== Early life and education ==
Verder was born on June 18, 1900, in Davenport, Iowa. She earned a B.S. (1923) and Ph.D. (1928) from the University of Chicago under doctoral advisor Sara Branham Matthews. Her thesis was titled Effect of Diets Deficient in Vitamin A or B on Resistance to Paratyphoid-Enteritidis Organisms.

== Career ==
From 1928 to 1932, Verder was an instructor in bacteriology at University of Chicago for 3 years. She was an assistant professor at George Washington University School of Medicine & Health Sciences from 1932 to 1935. In 1935, Verder was an assistant bacteriologist with the Maryland Department of Health.

She came to National Institute of Allergy and Infectious Diseases (NIAID) in 1936, as an associate bacteriologist and worked with Alice Catherine Evans. Verder is known for characterizing different strains of staphylococcus, particularly those resistant to antibiotics. Trained in the bacteriological methods of the time (1938), Verder spent her intramural research career at NIAID studying gastrointestinal flora and staphylococci and training NIH staff in bacteriological methods. She also researched food poisoning, pseudomonas, and pleuropneumonia organisms. She was promoted to bacteriologist in 1940 and senior bacteriologist in 1954.

Beginning in 1962, she worked as a science administrator, serving as chief of the bacteriology and mycology branch of the NIAID extramural program. She retired from NIAID on June 30, 1970. In August 1970, Verder attended the International Congress for Microbiology in Mexico City. From 1971 to 1972, she was an administrator in the graduate programs in the department of microbiology at University of Texas Medical School.

Verder was a Fellow of the American Association for the Advancement of Science, and the American Public Health Association. She was a member of the American Academy of Microbiology and the New York Academy of Sciences.

Verder died in Arlington Heights, Illinois on August 28, 1997.
