= Surfactant therapy =

Medical administration of exogenous surfactant

- Other names: Surfactant application, Surfactant replacement
- Specialty: Neonatology

Surfactant therapy is the medical administration of pulmonary surfactant that is derived from outside of the body. Pulmonary surfactant is a soap-like chemical synthesized by type II alveolar pneumocytes and is of various lipids (80% phospholipids, 5-10% cholesterol, and ~10% surfactant-associated proteins). This biological fluid reduces surface tension and lines the aqueous layer covering the alveolar surface of the lung. For more details, see Pulmonary surfactant.

Surfactant therapy, or surfactant replacement therapy, is used in situations where there is not sufficient fluid covering the lung. The most common use is in premature neonates or babies born with respiratory distress syndrome. Conditions adult respiratory distress syndrome or Hyaline Membrane Disease are also sometimes treated with exogenously derived surfactant. One of the more common uses of surfactant therapy is to treat alveolar surfactant deficiency in premature newborns. Most commonly, treatment is composed of multiple doses of 100 mg/kg of exogenous surfactant.

== Types of Surfactants ==
Poractant alfa (Curosurf™), calfactant (Infasurf™), and beractant (Survanta™) are types of natural surfactants commercially available in the United States. Although data is sometimes conflicting, it appears that there are no significant differences among the available preparations.

== Treatments ==
=== LISA surfactant delivery in infants ===
The LISA (Less Invasive Surfactant Administration) method is much more effective in situations where the preterm infant is already breathing, and it has become a standard procedure in German hospitals. Intubation via mechanical ventilation is less effective than the LISA method within the first 72 hours of birth.

=== Respiratory Distress Syndrome ===
Exogenous surfactant replacement therapy is effective in reducing Infant respiratory distress syndrome (IRDS) mortality and morbidity in preterm infants.

=== Adult respiratory distress syndrome ===
Surfactant therapy is not used to treat adults with adult respiratory distress syndrome because the evidence regarding its effect on patient-important outcomes is inconsistent. As of 2019, there is no evidence showing that treatments with exogenous surfactants, statins, beta-blockers or N-acetylcysteine decreases early mortality, late all-cause mortality, duration of mechanical ventilation, or number of ventilator-free days.

== See also ==
- Respiratory care
- Nursing
- Neonatology
- Meconium aspiration syndrome
