= William Northway =

American pediatric radiologist (1932–2022)

William H. Northway Jr. (November 26, 1932 – January 26, 2022) was an American pediatric radiologist. He is known for describing bronchopulmonary dysplasia (BPD), a chronic lung disease "caused by barotrauma and oxygen injury in preterm infants requiring mechanical ventilation."

Northway was born in San Francisco, California. After receiving his medical degree from Stanford School of Medicine in 1957, he completed his residency in radiology and then studied at the University of Paris. In 1964, after returning to Stanford University Medical Center—where he spoke with neonatologist Philip Sunshine—Northway noted a consistent pattern of cystic changes in the lungs in radiographs of premature infants. He discovered that the infants had all received mechanical ventilation and high-concentration supplemental oxygen, causing damage to the lungs. In 1967, Northway, Robert Rosan, and David Porter described the disease, coining the term "bronchopulmonary dysplasia". They also "acknowledged other comorbidities of BPD, including retinopathy of prematurity and brain injury." Their article has been called "one of the most important, most cited, and influential articles in the history of neonatology"; it influenced neonatal care worldwide, leading to reduced ventilation pressure and supplemental oxygen levels in premature infants to improve their health outcomes.

Awards Northway received include:

- 1998 – Society for Pediatric Radiology (SPR) Pioneer Award
- 2003 – Society for Pediatric Radiology Gold Medal
- 2005 – J. E. Wallace Sterling Lifetime Alumni Achievement Award by Stanford University
- 2006 – Lucile Packard Children’s Hospital Distinguished Medical Staff Award
- 2017 – Neonatal Landmark Award by the American Academy of Pediatrics
