= Wilson–Mikity syndrome =

- Other names: Pulmonary dysmaturity syndrome
- Specialty: Pediatrics

Wilson–Mikity syndrome, a form of chronic lung disease (CLD) that exists only in premature infants, leads to progressive or immediate development of respiratory distress. This rare condition affects low birth babies and is characterized by rapid development of lung emphysema after birth, requiring prolonged ventilation and oxygen supplementation. It is closely related to bronchopulmonary dysplasia (BPD), differing mainly in the lack of prior ventilatory support. All the initial patients described with Wilson–Mikity syndrome were very low birth weight infants that had no history of mechanical ventilation, yet developed a syndrome that clinically resembled BPD. Upon the death of some of these infants, autopsies showed histologic changes similar to those seen in BPD.

It was characterized by Miriam G. Wilson and Victor G. Mikity in 1960.

== Symptoms and signs ==
The onset of respiratory difficulty occurs at the first day of life and continues up to three weeks into the infant's life, at which point treatment is needed for infant survival.

=== Complications ===
Mothers who have developed chorioamnionitis during pregnancy put their infant at higher risk for development of Wilson–Mikity syndrome. It is a rare complication that requires prolonged treatment. Infection, however, is not shown to be an etiological factor, but a correlation to chorioamnionitis is identified as a risk.

== Cause ==
The cause of Wilson–Mikity syndrome is unknown.

== Diagnosis ==
The diagnosis of Wilson–Mikity syndrome can be made through two distinct symptoms: analogous characteristics of respiratory distress syndrome and presence of diffuse and streaky infiltrates with small cystic changes, seen through a chest X-ray. Early screening allows for the identification of a collapsed lung, cystic changes within the lung, and possible start of right-sided heart failure. Upon autopsy, alveolar collapse and alveoli rupture can be seen. This can reduce the number of capillaries within the system and lead to cyanosis. Cyanosis occurs from chronic or intermittent respiratory distress and episodes of dyspnea (or apnea). Symptoms can develop within hours post-birth or be gradual; infants will experience transient respiratory distress, causing a lapse in diagnosis by around 30 to 40 days. Dangerous recurrent apnea (or dyspnea) can occur in the first two to six weeks postpartum. This cessation of breathing can progress to cyanosis and lung collapse.

Infants display deteriorating respiratory symptoms along with early chronic lung changes which can be seen on chest radiography. These changes are diagnosed either directly upon birth or within the first month, as the premature infant requires mechanical ventilation for survival.

== Treatment ==
When caught early enough, continuous, mechanical oxygen therapy can be used to reverse the infant's poor circulation and decreased blood oxygen, a symptom known as cyanosis. Improvement is gradual; however, cases show that after the first year of treatment using oxygen therapy and mechanical ventilators, infants show normal respiratory activity and are free from chest infiltrates with small cystic changes. Absence of fever (febrile), and normal white blood cell count correspond to successful reversion and allow for a positive prognosis.

When not treated properly, methods of reversion using oxygen supplementation and ventilation have the possibility to put the infant at risk for rare complications. If not enough oxygen is administered to the infant, the apnea continues and the infant is unable proper recovery. In contrast, too much oxygen administered can lead to higher risk for retrolental fibroplasia and/or oxygen toxicity within the lungs. Continued dyspnea is a sign that Wilson–Mikity syndrome is still affecting the infant. Increased ventilation to allow proper respiration is then required. Patients in recovery are slowly taken off oxygen support and eventually are able to ventilate with minimal to no respiratory distress.

There is a lack of research on the long-term effects of Wilson-Mikity into adulthood.

== Epidemiology ==
Around 75% of affected infants survive and are able to receive oxygen therapies and treatments to overcome this disease. In fatal cases, infants do not have noticeable or substantial respiratory recovery and can develop right-sided heart failure, ultimately leading to death. Patients that are not recovering will also continue to show signs of dyspnea, respiratory distress, and continued low body weight, heightening the risk of death. Infants that survive six months or longer have substantially better prognosis.

== See also ==
- Infant respiratory distress syndrome
- Bronchopulmonary dysplasia
- Chronic obstructive pulmonary disease
- Retrolental Fibroplasia
- Chorioamnionitis
