= Agnar Höskuldsson =

Danish chemist (born 1939)

Agnar Hoeskuldsson
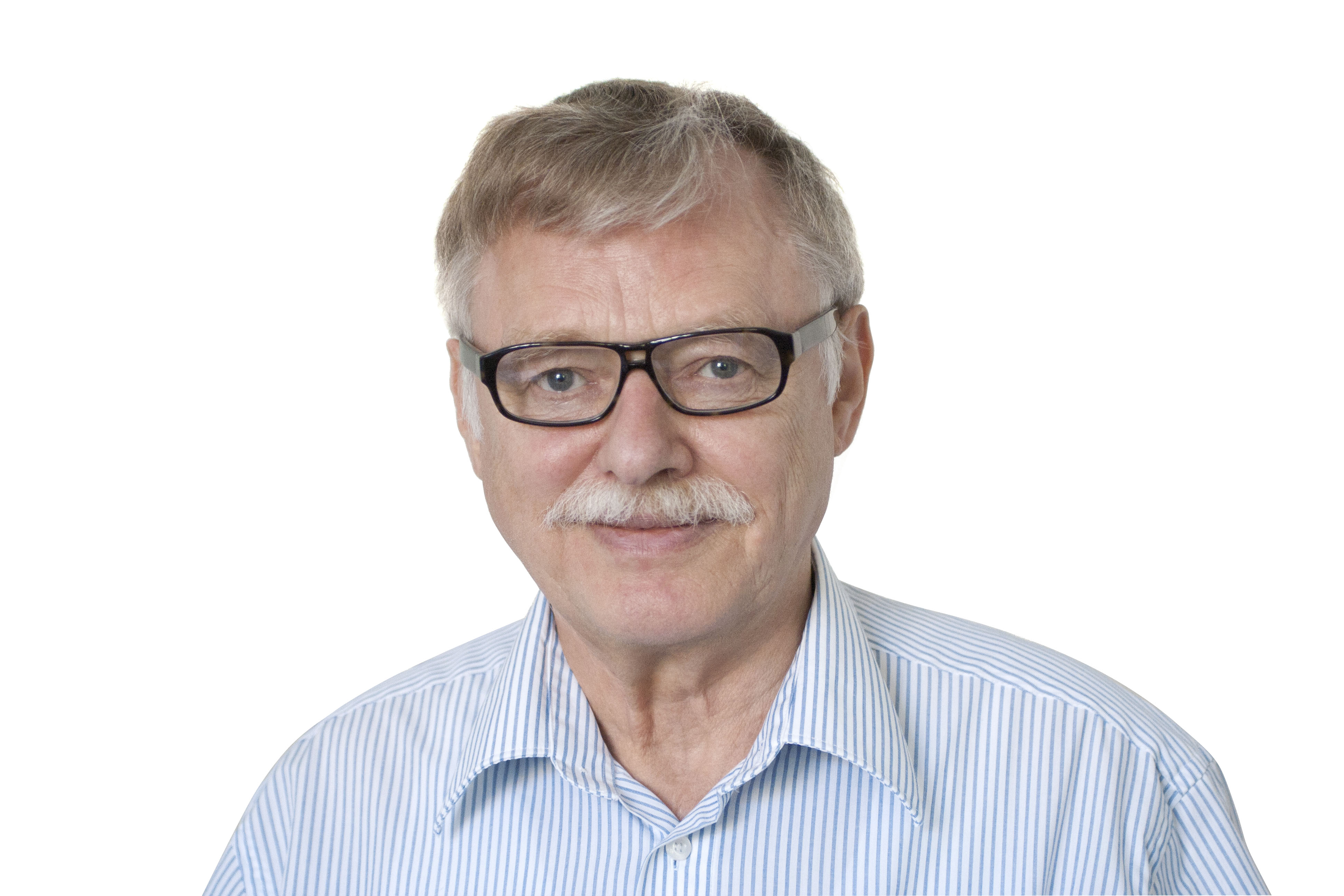
- Agnar Hoeskuldsson
- Born: 1939 (age 86–87); Iceland
- Education: PhD
- Occupation: Co-founder at SIME Diagnostics

Dr. Agnar Höskuldsson (born 1939) is a Danish scientist who specializes in the field of chemometrics. He was formerly an associate professor at the Technical University of Denmark. He was awarded the Herman Wold gold medal for his contribution to chemometrics in 1997 and over the span of his career he has published over 30 scientific papers and is credited with over 2000 scientific citations.

== Biography ==
Originally from Iceland, Höskuldsson moved to Denmark in 1960 to study applied mathematics at the University of Copenhagen. After completing his Master of Science in 1966 he joined Copenhagen Business School where he was awarded a PhD in applied production technology.

== Career ==
In 1975 Höskuldsson started working at The Regional Computing Centre at Technical University of Denmark as a computer specialist in statistics and production technology. Then, in 1987, he was appointed as an associate professor at Technical University of Denmark. During his professorship he successfully showed that the PLS (Partial Least Squares) algorithm can be a principle in any of a variety of mathematical inequalities asserting a fundamental limit to the precision with which certain pairs of physical properties of a particle known as complementary variables can be known simultaneously. In 1927 Werner Heisenberg stated that the more precisely the position of a particle is determined, the less precisely its momentum can be known, and vice versa. Based on this theory, Höskuldsson’s H-Principle finds a solution in a stepwise way which viewed as maximizing the co-variance between two data sets. Demonstrating that PLS regression is of a similar kind to the well-known canonical correlation in multivariate statistics.

In 1996 he published "Prediction Methods in Science and Technology", a review of latent structure regression, including PLS regression.

The following year Höskuldsson received the Herman Wold gold medal from the Swedish Chemical Society at the Scandinavian Symposium on Chemometrics as recognition of his contributions and pioneering work in the field of chemometrics.

In 2008 Höskuldsson founded SIME Diagnostics, a company focused on digitising healthcare diagnostics and is his current employment.

== The H-Principle of applied mathematics ==
Developed by Agnar Höskuldsson, 'The H-Principle', is a new foundation for obtaining solutions to mathematical methods where the data is uncertain. The uncertainty approach each step is an optimal balance, which is determined between the improvement in the mathematical criterion and the associated precision.

The H-principle has been extended to many areas of applied mathematics due to its flexible and adaptable nature. Making it possible for it to be a common framework for numerical computations of methods in applied mathematics, which use linear algebra and where data are uncertain.
