= Philip Sunshine =

American neonatologist (1930–2025)

Dr. Philip Sunshine in the early 2010s

Philip Sunshine (June 16, 1930 – April 5, 2025) was an American physician and pioneer in the field of neonatology. He had an endowed professorship named after him at Stanford University. Sunshine was awarded the American Academy of Pediatrics' Virginia Apgar award in 2001. Sunshine died on April 5, 2025, at the age of 94.

== See also ==
- William Northway
