= Health outcomes for adults born prematurely =

- Specialty: Pediatrics, developmental biology, neurology, cardiology
- Usual onset: Childhood to adulthood
- Duration: Lifelong
- Causes: Preterm birth (<37 weeks), root cause of preterm birth often unknown
- Frequency: 10.66% - worldwide

Health outcomes for adults born prematurely are the long-term health effects for people who were born preterm, defined as being birthed at a gestational age of less than 37 weeks. It can be associated with and is often studied in the same group as low birth weight, but they are not the same, as preterms can also be large for gestational age. The consequences of prematurity result from various factors, including genetic predisposition, conditions during pregnancy and childbirth, the level of neonatal care received, and the home environment. Due to advances in preterm survival rates, adults born preterm are an steadily increasing patient population, though they remain underperceived.

Adults born preterm have higher all-cause mortality rates as compared to full-term adults. Premature birth is associated with a 1.2x to 1.6x increase in all-cause mortality rates during early to mid-adulthood. Those born extremely prematurely (22–27 weeks) have an even higher mortality rate of 1.9x to 4.0x.

Preterms have increased risks of chronic disorders involving cardiovascular, endocrine/metabolic, respiratory, renal, neurodevelopmental, and psychiatric disorders.

Effects of preterm birth do not disappear after age 2. Despite appearing normal, preterm children may not physically "catch up" with full-term children.

== Cardiovascular/respiratory ==
Risks

- high blood pressure, with higher rates of both systolic and diastolic blood pressure
- increased risks of ischemic heart disease that appear in early adulthood
- reduced pulmonary function
- long-term obstructive lung disease
- respiratory infections
- sleep-disordered breathing
- congenital heart defects
- impaired exercise tolerance

Causes

Underdeveloped hearts and lungs, the lack of lung catch-up growth, airflow obstruction consistent with chronic obstructive pulmonary disease, and the close relation of lung health to cardiovascular health may result in impaired exercise tolerance and hypertension.

Preterm adults in their mid-20s observed with cardiovascular magnetic resonance have hearts with smaller ventricles and thicker heart walls, resulting in a heart that is less efficient at pumping blood. The more premature the birth, the smaller and weaker the heart. Preterm fetuses switch from fetal circulation to postnatal circulation before the left ventricle is completed, resulting in an unusually large left ventricular structure with three-dimensional geometry.

Preterm or being large for gestational age increases the risk of atrial fibrilliation, or rapid, irregular heart rhythm, later in life.

Treatment

Cardiologist Dr. Adam Lewandowski recommends focusing on blood pressure management.

== Endocrine/metabolic ==
Risks

- type 1 diabetes and type 2 diabetes
- lipid disorders
- cardiometabolic disorders

Thyroid dysfunction is common in preterm infants. Independently from birth weight, preterms have higher rates of hypothalamus-pituitary-thyroid axis dysfunction later in life.

== Renal ==
Individuals born preterm (28-37 weeks) have an approximately doubled risk of chronic kidney disease, while individuals born extremely preterm (<28 weeks) have a nearly tripled risk by age 43. This occurs even after adjustment for confounding variables such as maternal age, and may be due to a decreased number of nephrons seen throughout life in adults born prematurely.

== Neurodevelopmental ==
=== Ophthalmic ===
Neurological and respiratory complications frequently accompany severe retinopathy of prematurity.

Preterm birth and low birth weight is associated with visual perceptual impairment and suboptimal face recognition skills, also known as face blindness.

=== Risks ===
- Increased rates of cerebral palsy and other motor impairments such as developmental coordination disorder, epilepsy, autism, depression, anxiety, bipolar disorder, and nonaffective psychosis, schizoid personality disorder, ADHD and eating disorders
- Learning disabilities and other functioning issues may not appear until second grade and middle school years.
- Reduced risk of anti-social behavior, risk-taking behaviors, and substance use disorders
- More learning disabilities, struggles with mathematics and need more school services than full-terms. One estimate is that one-third of preterms required school services, but only 22% of them received them.
- Increased risks of anxiolytic, hypnotic, antipsychotic, as well as antiepileptic prescription at age 30 years
- A persistent drive to succeed, and with nurturing mothers that provided support performed better academically, socially and physically.
- Big five personality traits: Higher on traits of introversion, neuroticism and autistic features, lower on risk taking and agreeableness. Lower openness, higher on introversion, conscientiousness, agreeableness and neuroticism. Less likely to binge drink, use illegal drugs or be parents. Lower health, life satisfaction and job satisfaction. However, non-preterms who reported long hospital stays at birth showed similar results to preterms with a few exceptions.

=== Causes ===
Preterm birth is associated with alterations in volume of nervous tissue in early adulthood, including temporal, frontal, parietal and occipital areas. Third-trimester brain development involves energy-dependent biological processes for optimal brain growth, which are disturbed in preterm infants even without observable structural brain injury.

Functional near infrared spectroscopy has been used to assess cerebral hemodynamics, linking hemodynamic activity with the development of brain functions.

Due to lack of maternal thyroid hormones at a time when their own thyroid is unable to meet their postnatal needs, preterms may suffer from neurodevelopmental disorders.

== Other causes ==
The fetal origins hypothesis suggests that the stress response of pre-term infants may underlie adult chronic diseases, possibly in relation to the hypothalamic-pituitary adrenal (HPA) axis.

Adverse health effects may be related to organs failing to achieve optimal development.

== Treatment ==
Pulmonary vulnerabilities warrant asthma control as needed, keeping current on influenza and Pneumococcus vaccinations, and avoiding smoking. Increased risk of cardiovascular, metabolic, and kidney diseases suggest that risk factors should be monitored and patients counseled on maintaining a healthy lifestyle.

== See also ==
- Preterm births
- Low birth weight
