= Neonatology =

Medical care of newborns, especially the ill or premature

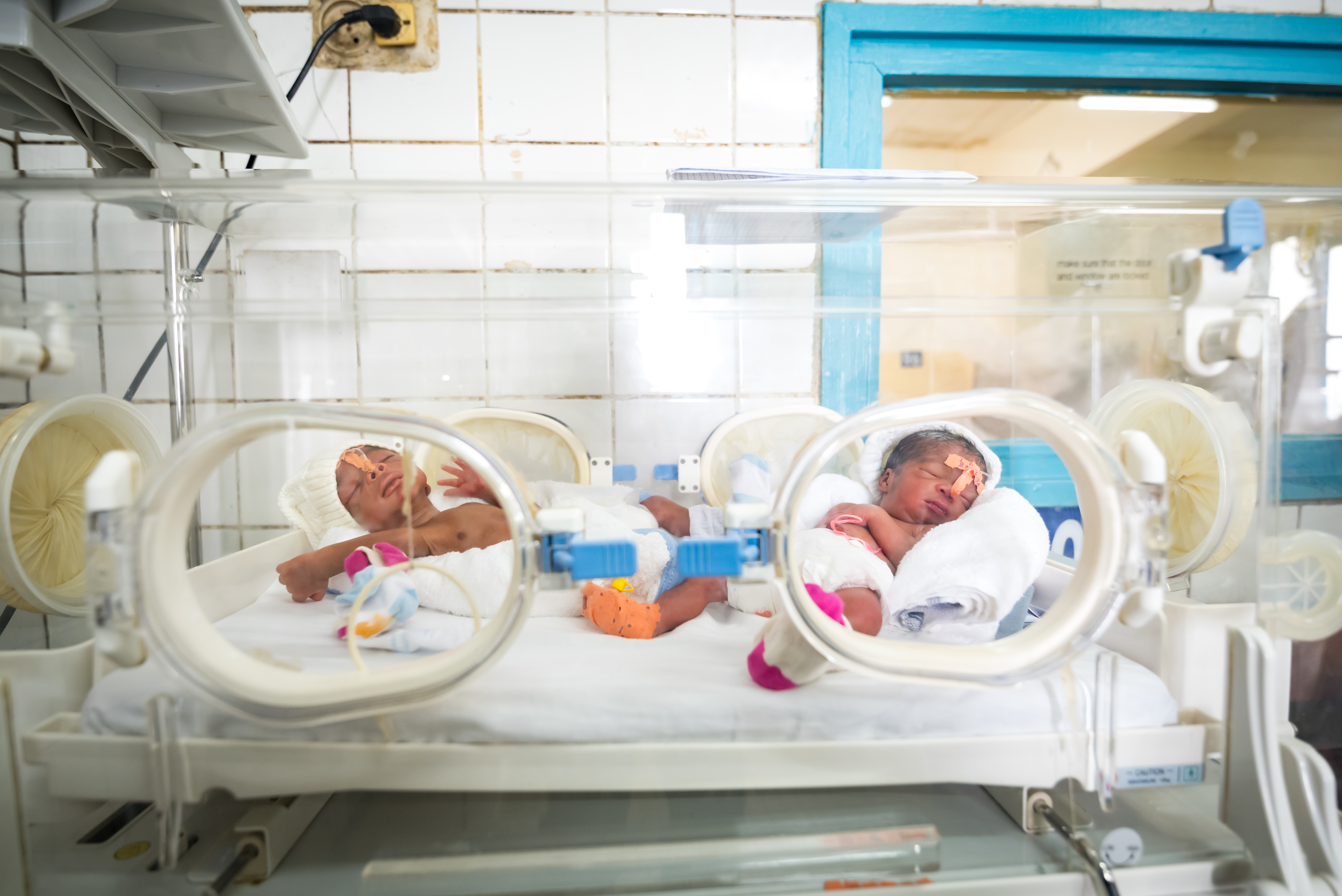
- Twins sleeping in a neonatal incubator in Douala, Cameroon.
- Synonym: Neonatal medicine
- Focus: Newborn care
- Significant diseases: Complications of prematurity; Respiratory disorders; Neonatal infections; Congenital anomalies
- Specialist: Neonatologist; Neonatal critical care doctor

Neonatology (also neonatal medicine) is a subspecialty of pediatrics concerned with the care, development, and diseases of newborn infants, particularly those born prematurely or in need of critical care. Neonatologists are medical doctors who specialize in the care of newborns, often working in neonatal intensive care units (NICUs). Neonatal care often involves a multidisciplinary team to provide intensive monitoring, respiratory and nutritional support, neonatal resuscitation and transport, and support for families facing complex medical decisions. Conditions commonly managed include complications of prematurity, respiratory disorders, neonatal infections, and congenital anomalies.

The neonatal period is generally defined as the first 28 days of life, during which newborns are especially vulnerable. Advances in neonatal medicine, including incubator technology, mechanical ventilation, phototherapy, and pulmonary surfactant therapy, have contributed to substantially improved survival and outcomes for premature and critically ill infants. Modern neonatal care is delivered in a range of settings, including delivery rooms, newborn nurseries, and NICUs. Neonatology is also an academic discipline that includes clinical and basic science research. Ethical and medical-legal issues often involve decisions about life-sustaining treatment, in which parents and clinicians may need to consider expected survival, suffering, and disability.

== Historical developments ==
Though high infant mortality rates were recognized by the medical community at least as early as the 1860s, advances in modern neonatal intensive care have led to a significant decline in infant mortality in the modern era, falling from 5 million deaths globally in 1990 to 2.3 million in 2022. This has been achieved through a combination of technological advances, enhanced understanding of newborn physiology, improved sanitation practices, and development of specialized units for neonatal intensive care. Around the mid-19th century, the care of newborns was in its infancy and was led mainly by obstetricians; however, the early 1900s, pediatricians began to assume a more direct role in caring for neonates. The term "neonatology" was coined by Dr. Alexander Schaffer in 1960. The American Board of Pediatrics established an official sub-board certification for neonatology in 1975.

In 1835, the Russian physician Georg von Ruehl developed a rudimentary incubator made from two nestled metal tubs enclosing a layer of warm water. By the mid-1850s, these "warming tubs" were in regular use at the Moscow Foundling Hospital for the support of premature infants. In 1857, Jean-Louis-Paul Denuce was the first to publish a description of his own similar incubator design, and was the first physician to describe its utility in the support of premature infants in medical literature. By 1931, Dr. A Robert Bauer added more sophisticated upgrades to the incubator which allowed for humidity control and oxygen delivery in addition to heating capabilities, further contributing to improved survival in newborns.

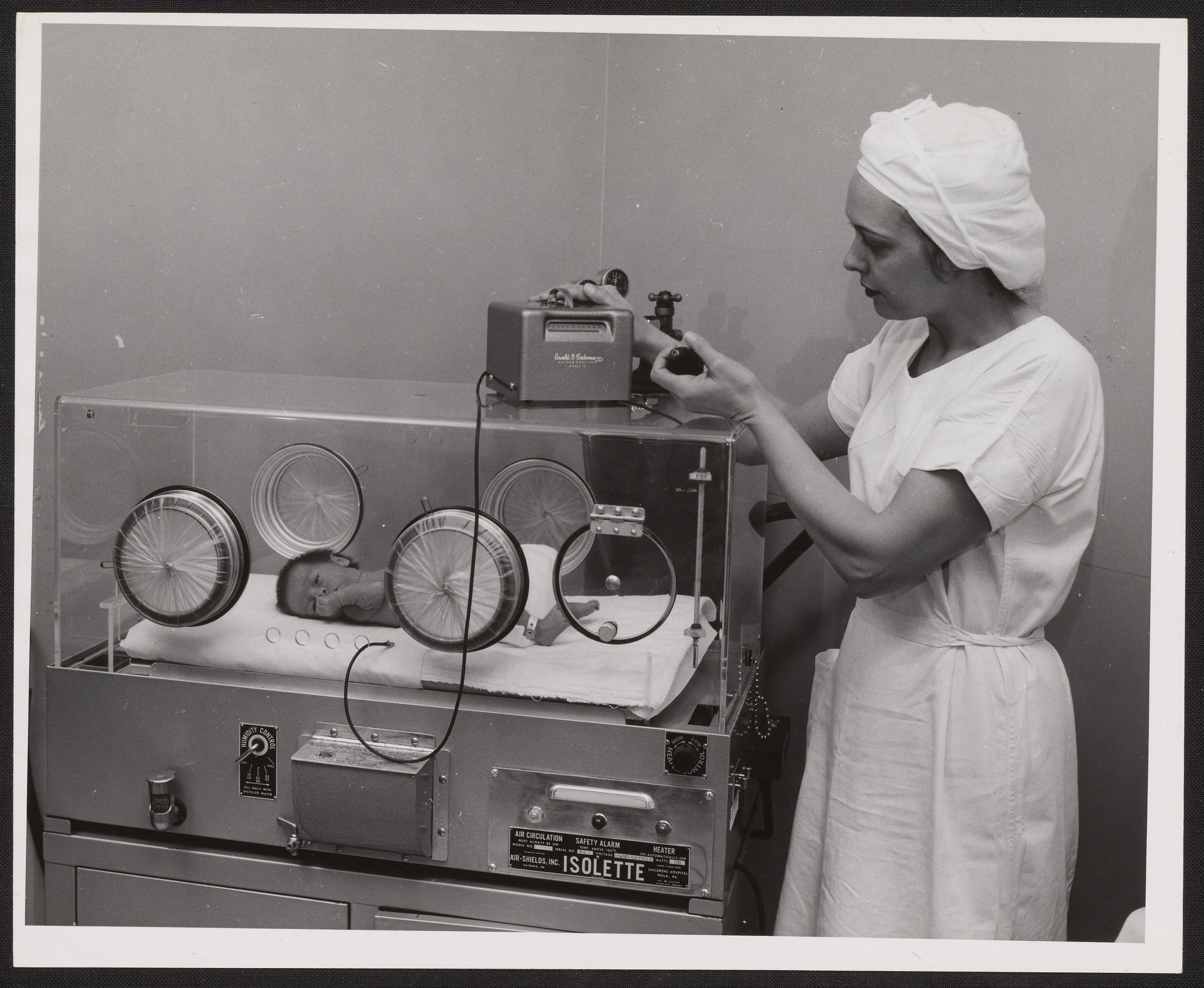
Nurse using an oxygen meter to monitor oxygen levels in a neonatal incubator, 1950s.

The 1950s brought a rapid escalation in neonatal services with the advent of mechanical ventilation of the newborn, allowing for survival at an increasingly smaller birth weight.

In 1952, the anesthesiologist Dr. Virginia Apgar developed the Apgar score, used for standardized assessment of infants immediately upon delivery, to guide further steps in resuscitation if necessary.

The first dedicated neonatal intensive care unit (NICU) was established at Yale New Haven Hospital in Connecticut in 1965, an effort led by Dr. Louis Gluck. Prior to the development of the NICU, premature and critically ill infants were attended to in nurseries without specialized resuscitation equipment.

In 1968, Dr. Jerold Lucey demonstrated that hyperbilirubinemia of prematurity (a form of neonatal jaundice) could be successfully treated through exposure to artificial blue light. This led to widespread use of phototherapy, which has now become a mainstay of treatment of neonatal jaundice.

In the 1980s, the development of pulmonary surfactant replacement therapy further improved survival of extremely premature infants and decreased chronic lung disease, one of the complications of mechanical ventilation, among less severely premature infants.

== Academic training ==
After completing medical school and specialty training in pediatrics, doctors undertake additional subspecialty training focused on neonatal care. Neonatal training programs generally involve several years of supervised clinical practice and culminate in subspecialty certification through national medical specialty boards or colleges. Among pediatric subspecialties, neonatology is the most widely available globally. Formal training opportunities in neonatology are less common in low-income countries than in middle- and high-income countries.

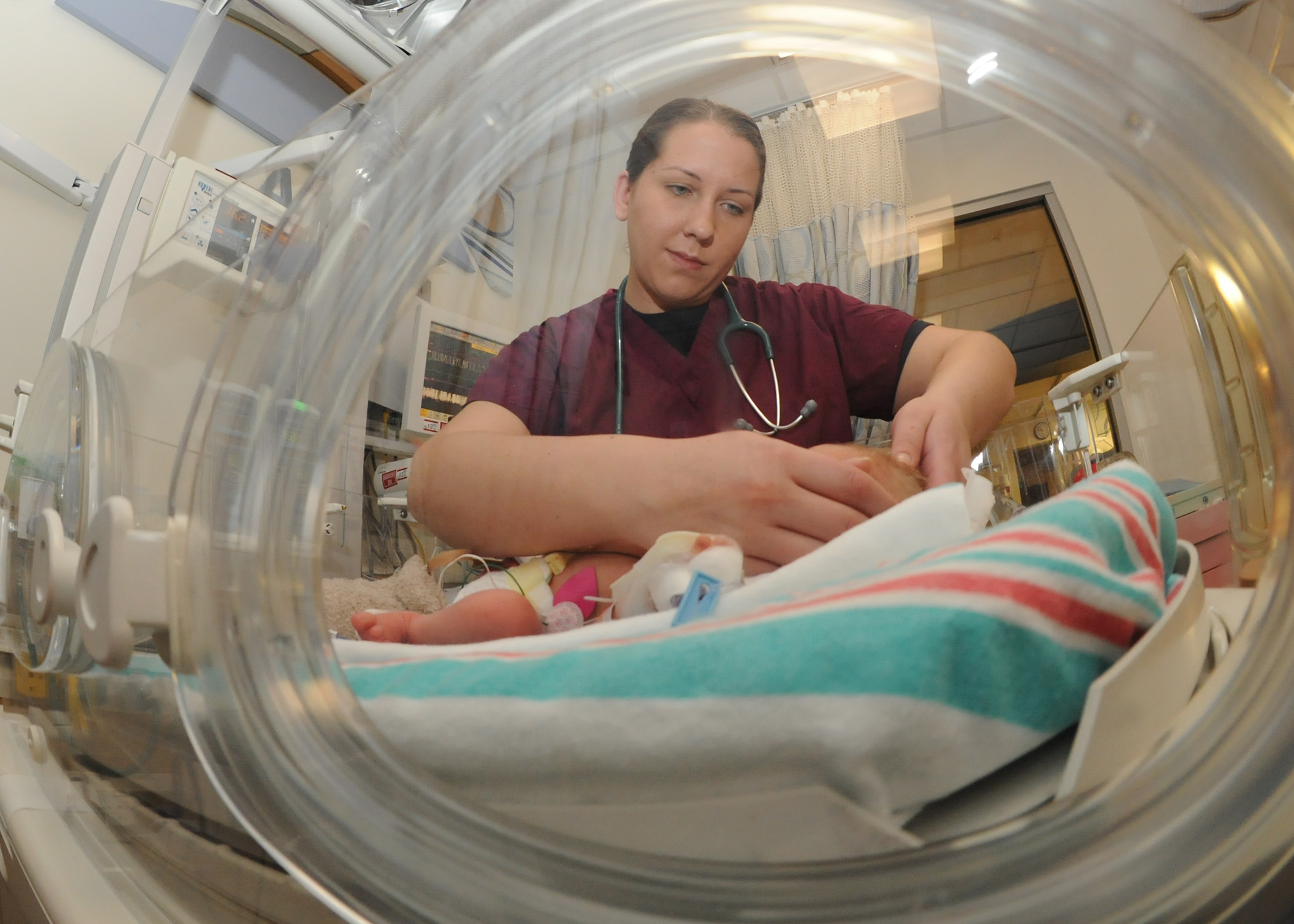
Resident doctor examining a newborn in a NICU in San Diego, California, United States.

In the United States, residency and fellowship programs are accredited by the Accreditation Council for Graduate Medical Education, which sets national standards for specialty and subspecialty medical training. Physicians with MD or DO degrees complete a three-year residency in pediatrics followed by a three-year fellowship in neonatal–perinatal medicine. Subspecialty certification is administered by the American Board of Pediatrics. Osteopathic physicians may also obtain certification through the American Osteopathic Board of Pediatrics.

In Mexico, medical doctors complete a three-year pediatrics residency before entering a two-year neonatology specialty program. Certification in neonatology is administered by the Mexican Council for Certification in Pediatrics.

In the United Kingdom, after graduation from medical school and completing the two-year foundation programme, a physician wishing to become a neonatologist would enroll in an eight-year paediatric specialty training programme. The last two to three years of this would be devoted to training in neonatology as a subspecialty.

In Canada, subspecialty training in neonatal–perinatal medicine is accredited by the Royal College of Physicians and Surgeons of Canada, which sets national standards for postgraduate medical training and certification. Neonatology programs are typically two-year fellowships following a four-year pediatric residency.

In Australia and New Zealand, neonatal–perinatal medicine training is overseen by the Royal Australasian College of Physicians, which administers physician and pediatric subspecialty training programs across both countries. Trainees complete three years of pediatric training followed by a structured three-year advanced training program in neonatal and perinatal medicine.

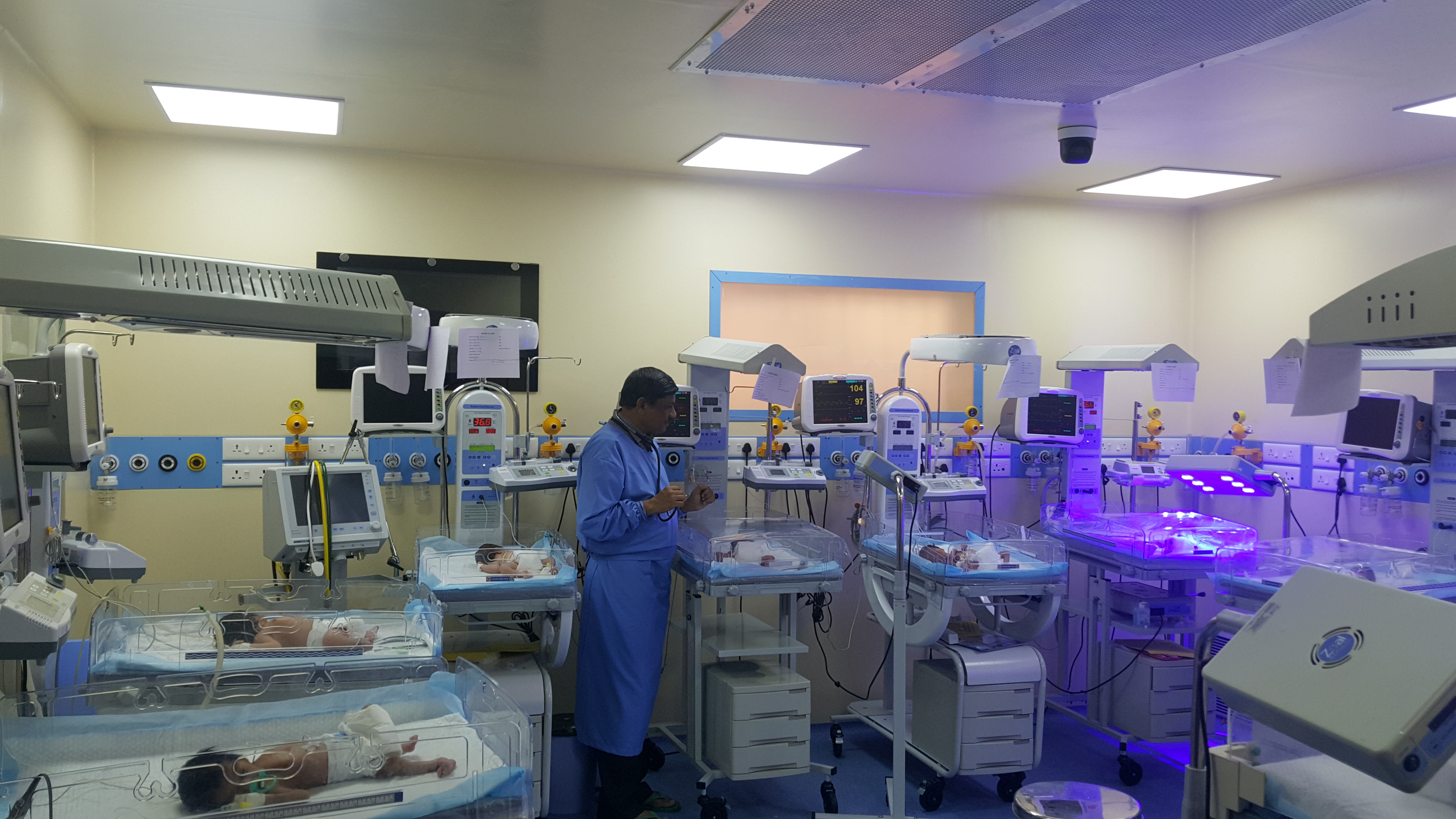
Neonatal intensive care unit with newborns in incubators in Telangana, India.

In India, neonatology training is undertaken after postgraduate training in pediatrics and is provided through several pathways. Fellowship programs typically last 12 to 18 months and are overseen by the National Neonatology Forum of India and the Indian Academy of Pediatrics. An additional pathway is offered through the National Board of Examinations in Medical Sciences, which administers the three-year Diplomate of National Board (DrNB) in Neonatology.

In South Korea, board certification in neonatology is available to pediatricians who have completed a four-year pediatrics residency and passed the pediatrics specialist examination. Candidates then complete two years of neonatology training at hospitals designated by the Korean Society of Neonatology, including at least one year as a fellow, before taking written and oral examinations administered by the Korean Pediatric Society.

In Tanzania, neonatology subspecialty training is offered through the Muhimbili University of Health and Allied Sciences, accredited by the Tanzania Commission for Universities, as a Master of Science in Clinical Neonatology. It is a two-year degree program, designed for medical doctors who have completed training in pediatrics, with graduates awarded a neonatology subspecialty certificate.

== Scope ==
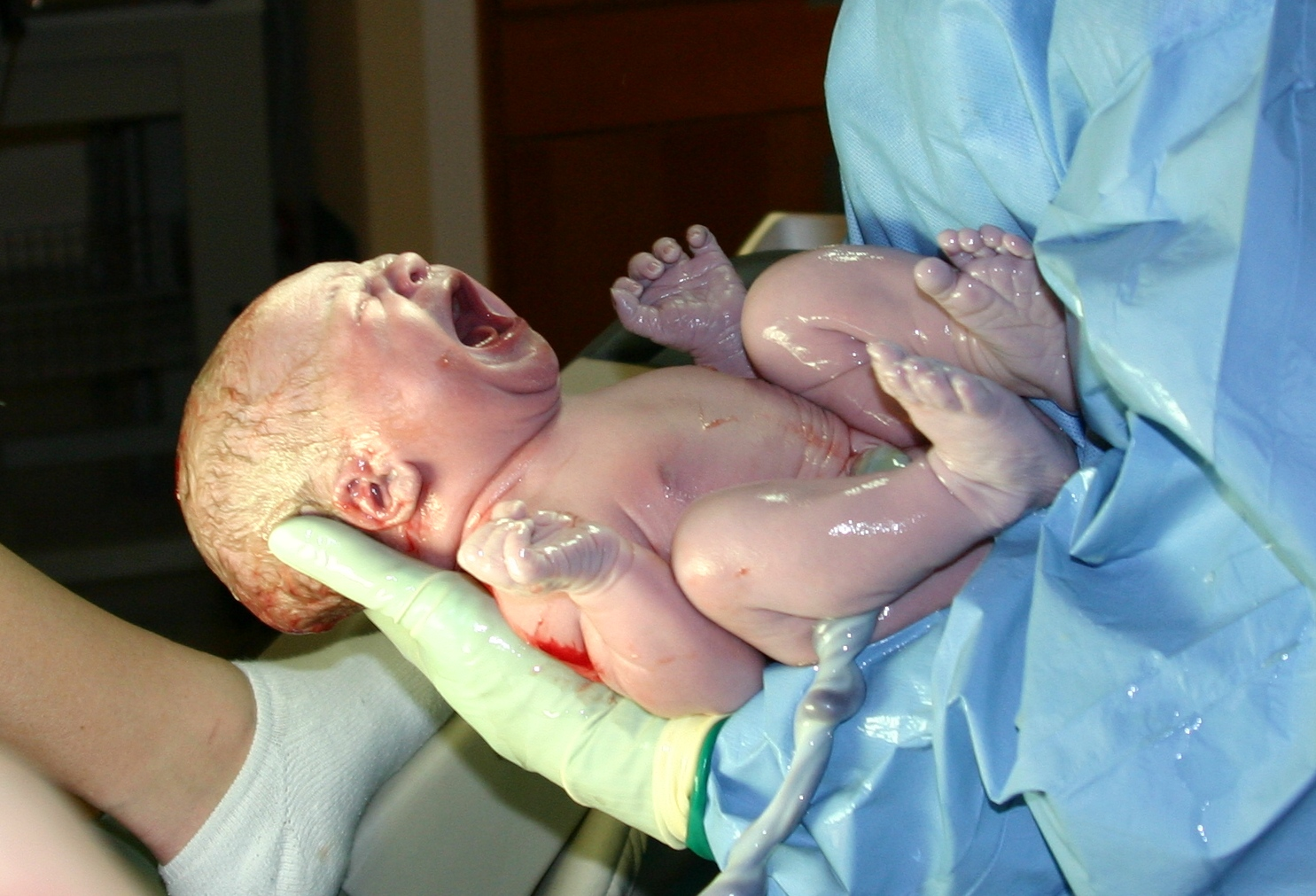
Full-term infant immediately after birth, with umbilical cord intact.

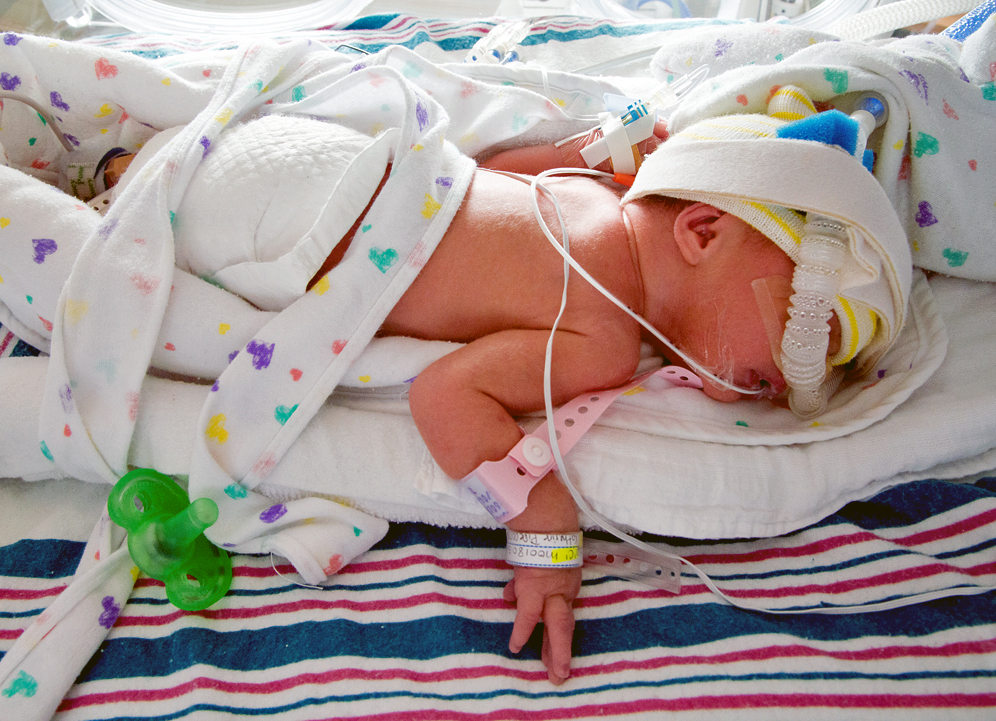
Preterm infant receiving nasal CPAP in a neonatal intensive care unit.

Neonatal medicine addresses conditions affecting infants during the neonatal period, generally defined as the first 28 days of life. Worldwide, the leading causes of neonatal death are premature birth, neonatal infections, birth complications (e.g., asphyxia, trauma), and congenital anomalies. Routine newborn care includes thermal protection (e.g., skin-to-skin contact between parent and infant), hygienic umbilical cord and skin care, breastfeeding, clinical assessment for signs of illness, and preventive measures (e.g., vaccination, vitamin K injection). While newborns are cared for in many settings, neonatologists typically work in hospitals or neonatal intensive care units (NICUs), where they care for premature or critically ill infants and may also oversee the evaluation and management of healthy newborns. In academic medical centers, neonatologists may participate in clinical and basic science research and may follow infants after discharge to assess long-term developmental outcomes.

Neonatology involves conditions related to fetal growth and development, complications arising from maternal disorders during pregnancy, and problems associated with labor, delivery, and the physiologic transition from fetal to extrauterine life. Neonatologists diagnose and manage genetic and chromosomal disorders, inborn errors of metabolism, infections acquired before, during, or shortly after birth, and disorders involving all major organ systems. Care is often delivered by multidisciplinary teams that may include neonatologists, neonatal nurses, respiratory therapists, dietitians, lactation consultants, physical therapists, pharmacists, social workers, and pastoral care. Neonatal transport involves stabilizing and transferring critically ill or high-risk newborns between facilities, often from birth hospitals to centers with higher-level neonatal intensive care.

== Investigations ==
Investigations relevant to neonatology may begin before birth when fetal or maternal findings suggest risk to the newborn, typically through prenatal evaluation by obstetricians or maternal-fetal medicine specialists. Based on this evaluation, neonatologists may become involved before delivery to counsel families and plan care for newborns expected to require delivery-room stabilization or intensive care. Prenatal ultrasound is the primary imaging technique used to estimate gestational age, assess fetal growth, and identify structural anomalies. Fetal echocardiography, genetic screening, amniocentesis, and chorionic villus sampling may be used to further evaluate suspected disorders.

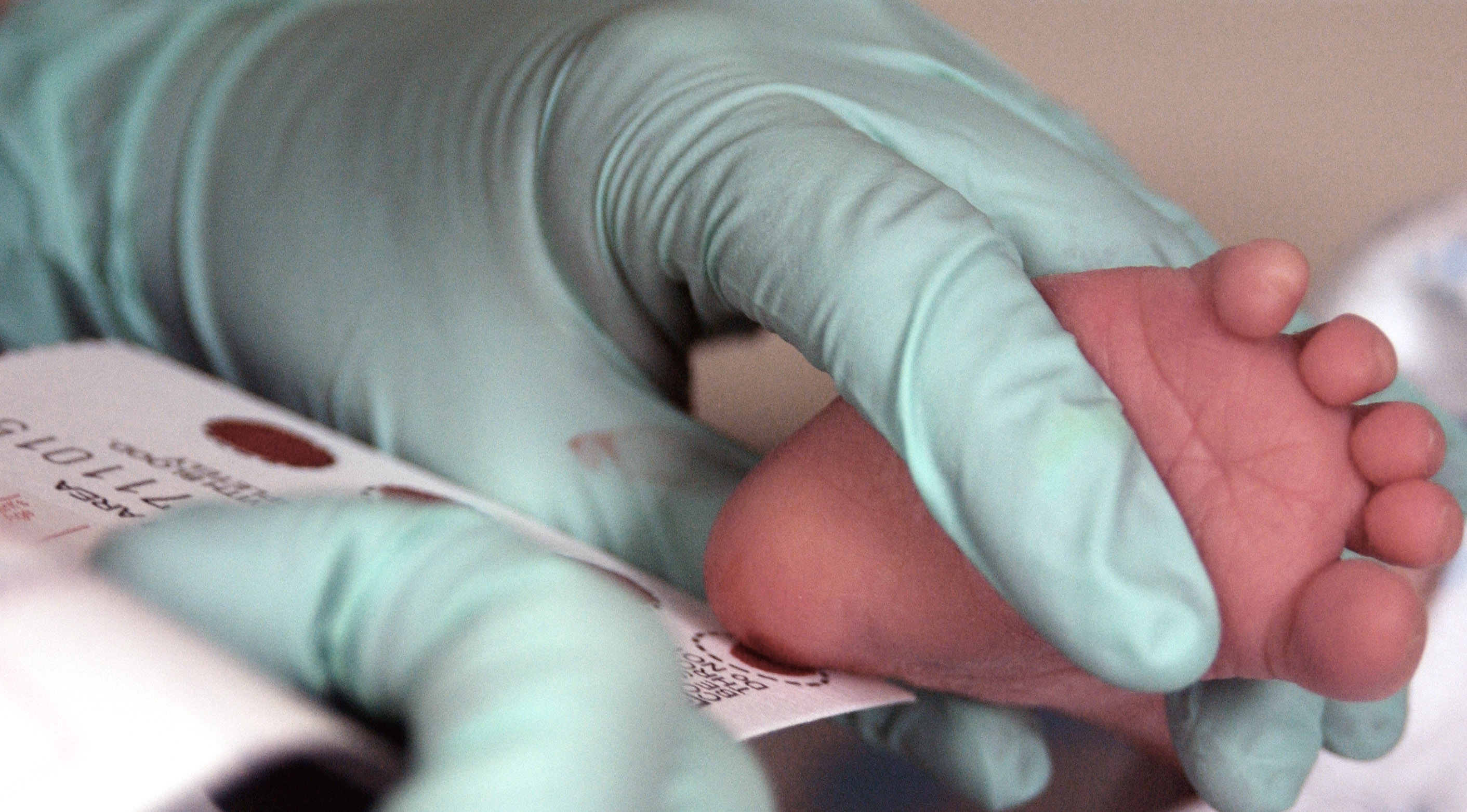
Blood collected from an infant's heel for routine newborn screening.

After birth, evaluation includes Apgar scoring and physical examination, with immediate assessment of breathing, heart rate, muscle tone, and the need for resuscitation. Growth is assessed by repeated measurements of weight, length, and head circumference, with interpretation adjusted for gestational age. Continuous monitoring of heart rate, respiration, blood pressure, temperature, and oxygen saturation is common in NICUs for the detection of apnea, hypoxemia, hypotension, fever, and other forms of instability.

Newborn screening is performed to identify serious, treatable conditions before symptoms appear. Screening typically involves a blood spot test, pulse oximetry, and a hearing evaluation. The specific panel of conditions included in newborn screening varies across the United States and around the world. Blood spot testing may screen for inborn errors of metabolism (e.g., phenylketonuria), inborn errors of immunity (e.g., severe combined immunodeficiency), congenital endocrine disorders (e.g., hypothyroidism), hemoglobinopathies (e.g., sickle cell disease), cystic fibrosis, and spinal muscular atrophy. Pulse oximetry is used to screen for critical congenital heart disease, a group of structural cardiac conditions that cause hypoxia and require intervention in the first year of life. Universal newborn hearing screening aims to identify hearing loss shortly after birth so that affected infants can receive timely intervention before language development.

Laboratory investigations include blood gas analysis, glucose and electrolyte testing, bilirubin measurement, blood counts, cultures, inflammatory markers, and urine studies. Cranial ultrasound is used to identify intraventricular hemorrhage. Echocardiography is used to evaluate congenital heart disease and pulmonary hypertension. Chest radiography (X-ray) is used in the evaluation of respiratory disease and to assess the position of endotracheal tubes, enteric tubes, and vascular lines. Electrocardiography (ECG) may be used to evaluate cardiac rhythm abnormalities. Electroencephalography (EEG) records the brain's electrical activity and is used when seizures are suspected. Abdominal and renal ultrasound are used to assess congenital or acquired abdominal and urinary tract disorders. Lumbar puncture (spinal tap) may be performed when central nervous system infection is suspected. Retinal screening is performed in premature infants at risk for retinopathy of prematurity.

== Treatments ==
Neonatal resuscitation may be required when a newborn does not establish effective breathing or circulation after birth. Initial steps include warming, drying, stimulation, airway positioning, and clearing secretions as needed. Positive-pressure ventilation is used, after initial measures, for apnea, gasping, or persistently low heart rate. Compared to cardiopulmonary resuscitation (CPR) in adults, chest compressions and medications are used less often.

Newborns, especially preterm and low-birth-weight infants, are prone to heat loss because of their high surface-area-to-volume ratio; thermal protection includes warm delivery-room conditions, drying and covering after birth, and the use of radiant warmers or incubators when necessary. Neonatal incubators are used to maintain a controlled thermal environment. Some incubators also allow for regulation of oxygen concentration and relative humidity to reduce evaporative water loss. Skin-to-skin contact with a parent or caregiver, also known as Kangaroo care, is broadly recommended for preterm or low-birth-weight infants to support temperature stability and improve breastfeeding.

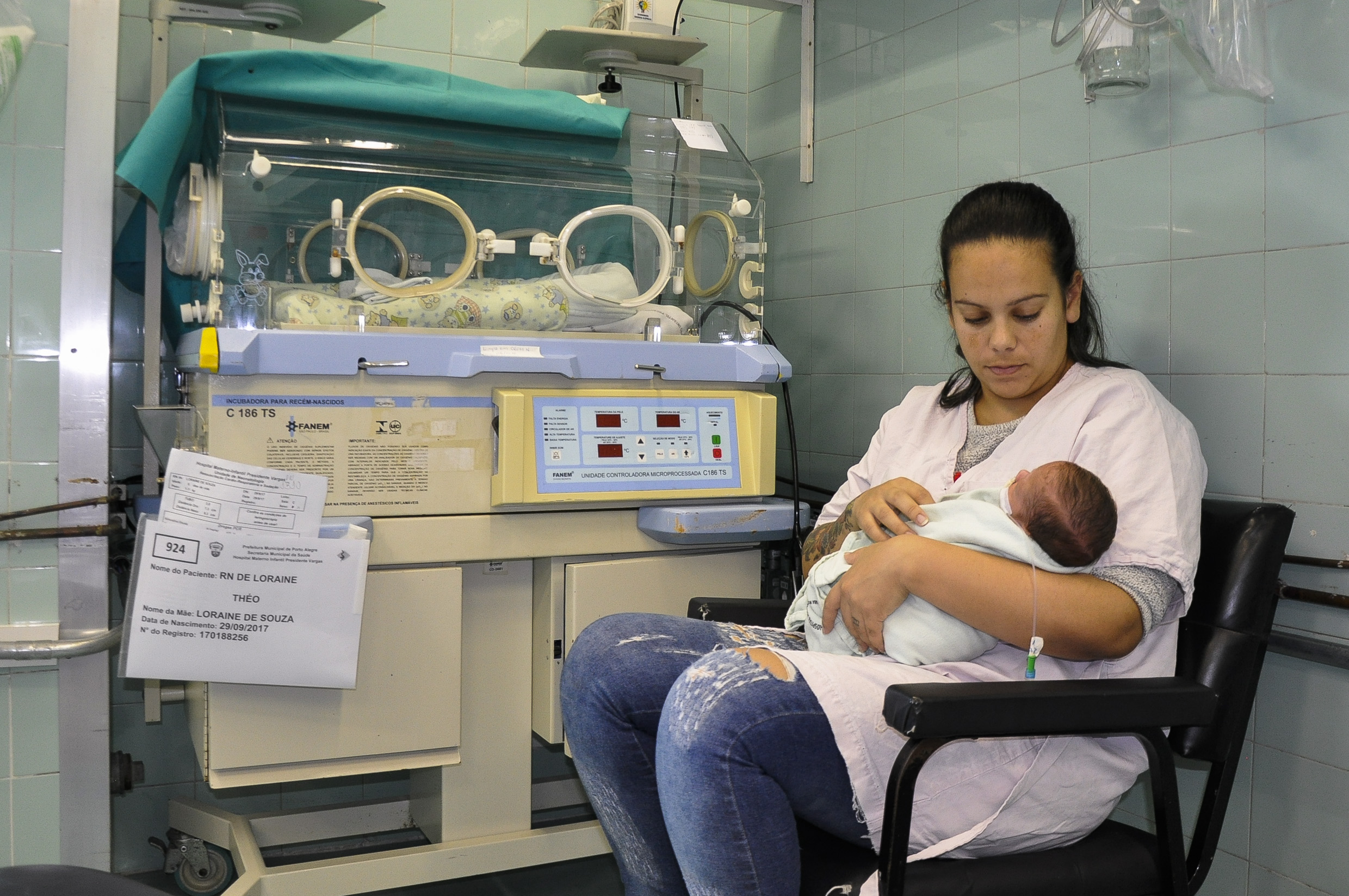
Mother holding her preterm infant beside an incubator in a NICU in Porto Alegre, Brazil.

Nutrition management involves breastfeeding support, donor breast milk services, enteral tube feeding (directly into the stomach or small intestine), and parenteral feeding (directly into the bloodstream) when enteral feeding is not possible. Care also involves maintaining fluid balance, electrolyte levels, and blood sugar levels.

Neonatal respiratory support may be non-invasive, such as heated humidified high-flow nasal cannula or continuous positive airway pressure (CPAP), or invasive, such as conventional or high-frequency mechanical ventilation. The level of support is adjusted to maintain adequate exchange of oxygen and carbon dioxide while minimizing lung injury from excessive pressure (barotrauma), volume (volutrauma), or oxygen (oxygen toxicity), which can contribute to bronchopulmonary dysplasia. Pulmonary surfactant therapy delivers a liquid lipid-protein mixture directly into the lungs of premature infants to prevent the collapse of immature air sacs. Routine preventative use of surfactant therapy has largely been replaced by selective use for infants with clinical signs of respiratory distress syndrome. Other respiratory treatments include caffeine for apnea of prematurity and inhaled nitric oxide for pulmonary hypertension.

Suspected neonatal sepsis and other serious infections are often treated with empiric antibiotics that are later modified when a specific microbe is identified and antimicrobial susceptibility is tested. Some viruses (e.g., herpes simplex virus) may be treated with antiviral medications.

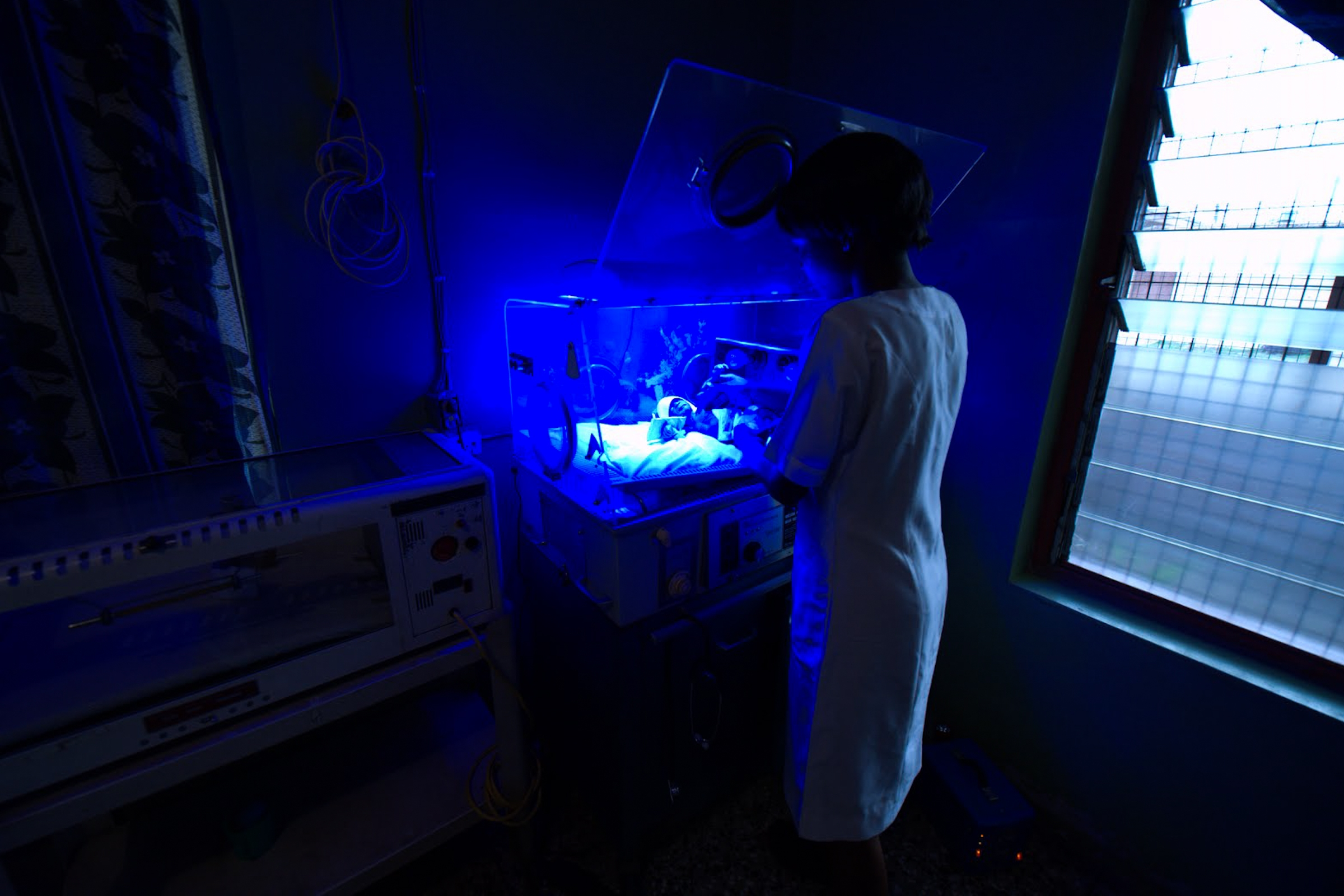
Infant receiving phototherapy for neonatal jaundice in a NICU in Ogbomoso, Nigeria.

Phototherapy is commonly used to treat neonatal jaundice caused by high levels of bilirubin in the blood. Blue light (430-490 nm) converts bilirubin into a water-soluble form that can be excreted in the urine and feces. Exchange transfusion is reserved for severe hyperbilirubinemia that does not respond adequately to phototherapy or when bilirubin encephalopathy is suspected.

Common procedures in neonatal intensive care include endotracheal intubation, umbilical catheterization, and chest tube insertion. Pediatric surgeons may perform fetal surgery for selected congenital anomalies that may worsen during fetal development; after birth, these and other conditions may be treated with neonatal surgery. Therapeutic hypothermia is used for eligible infants with hypoxic-ischemic encephalopathy, a form of brain injury caused by impaired oxygenation or blood flow to the brain around the time of birth.

For infants with complex or life-limiting conditions, neonatology may involve palliative care focused on symptom management, family support, and emotional care.

== Ethical and medical-legal issues ==
From both legal and ethical perspectives, parents are generally presumed to be the appropriate surrogate decision-makers for their children unless there is a specific reason for that authority to be limited or removed. While this authority is broadly recognized in countries around the world, the scope of parental authority and the processes for resolving disagreements over a child's medical care vary. In Prince v. Massachusetts (1944), the US Supreme Court held that parental authority is not absolute and may be restricted to protect a child's welfare. Parental authority is limited by laws that aim to protect children from harm and by ethical permissibility and medical feasibility.

In the care of critically ill newborns, decisions often involve whether life-sustaining treatment should be provided, withheld, or withdrawn. These questions may arise before birth when delivery is expected near the threshold of viability. At these early gestational ages, survival and neurodevelopmental outcomes are often uncertain, and parental goals may guide whether intensive care or comfort-focused care is planned. In the United States, the Baby Doe Law, a 1984 amendment to the Child Abuse Prevention and Treatment Act, required state child protective services to establish procedures for reporting the medical neglect of disabled newborns, which the law defines as the withholding of treatment unless a baby is irreversibly comatose or the treatment is futile and inhumane. This federal regulation applies only to infants and is intended to prevent discrimination on the basis of disability. In the Netherlands and Belgium, active euthanasia for severely suffering disabled newborns has been permitted under regulated protocols (e.g., the Groningen Protocol), with measures intended to promote transparency and reduce abuse; this practice remains ethically controversial.

Many accounts of neonatal decision-making emphasize the best interests standard. As stated in the UN Convention on the Rights of the Child, as ratified by all United Nations member states (except the United States), "in all actions concerning children, whether undertaken by public or private social welfare institutions, courts of law, administrative authorities or legislative bodies, the best interests of the child shall be a primary consideration". The best interests standard asks decision-makers to weigh expected benefits against expected burdens; the option that offers the most benefit and is least burdensome is in the patient's best interests. This approach may include judgments about survival, suffering, disability, and quality of life. In contrast, the harm principle shifts the focus from identifying the decision in the patient's best interest to ensuring the decision does not cause significant harm to the patient or family. As stated by the American Academy of Pediatrics, all children deserve medical treatment "likely to prevent substantial harm or suffering or death". On this view, parental choices are respected within a zone of parental discretion and overriding parental authority is justified only when the parental decision creates a substantial and immediate risk of serious harm, and when an alternative course of action is necessary to prevent that harm and is likely to be effective.

== See also ==
- Neonatal nursing
- Maternal–fetal medicine
- Neonatal intensive care unit
- Childbirth
