= Bronze baby syndrome =

Side effect of phototherapy

Bronze baby syndrome (BBS) is a rare side effect of phototherapy for neonatal jaundice. The exact mechanism of discoloration is not known.

The phenomenon was first described in 1972, by physicians Arthur E. Kopelman, Ralph S. Brown, and Gerard B. Odell.

BBS occurs when a neonate receiving phototherapy for neonatal jaundice also has a component of direct hyperbilirubinemia. The combination of direct hyperbilirubinemia and phototherapy causes a distinctive bronze/grey discoloration of the skin of the infant. The discoloration is permanent through the life of the skin cells, so can take 3-4 weeks to resolve as old skin cells are replaced by new without discoloration.

This discoloration is not overall harmful to the infant but may be cosmetically concerning to parents, and it is hypothesized that it could interfere with transcutaneous monitoring of infants, like pulse oximetry and transcutaneous carbon dioxide monitors used in intensive care. That effect is not yet fully studied due to the rarity of the condition.

Development of BBS is an indication to consider proceeding to exchange transfusion for hyperbilirubinemia in the neonate, though some report successful continued treatment despite the condition.
