= Pulmonary hyperplasia =

- Specialty: Neonatology

Pulmonary hyperplasia is a serious pathological event which occurs in neonatal medicine. It leads to pulmonary hypertension and acute respiratory distress syndrome. Histologically the lungs classically exhibit "synchronous" hypermaturity". It is thought that this condition is a lot less rare than previously thought due to under-recognition.
