= Newborn Emergency Transport Service =

Ambulance transport for intensive-care children

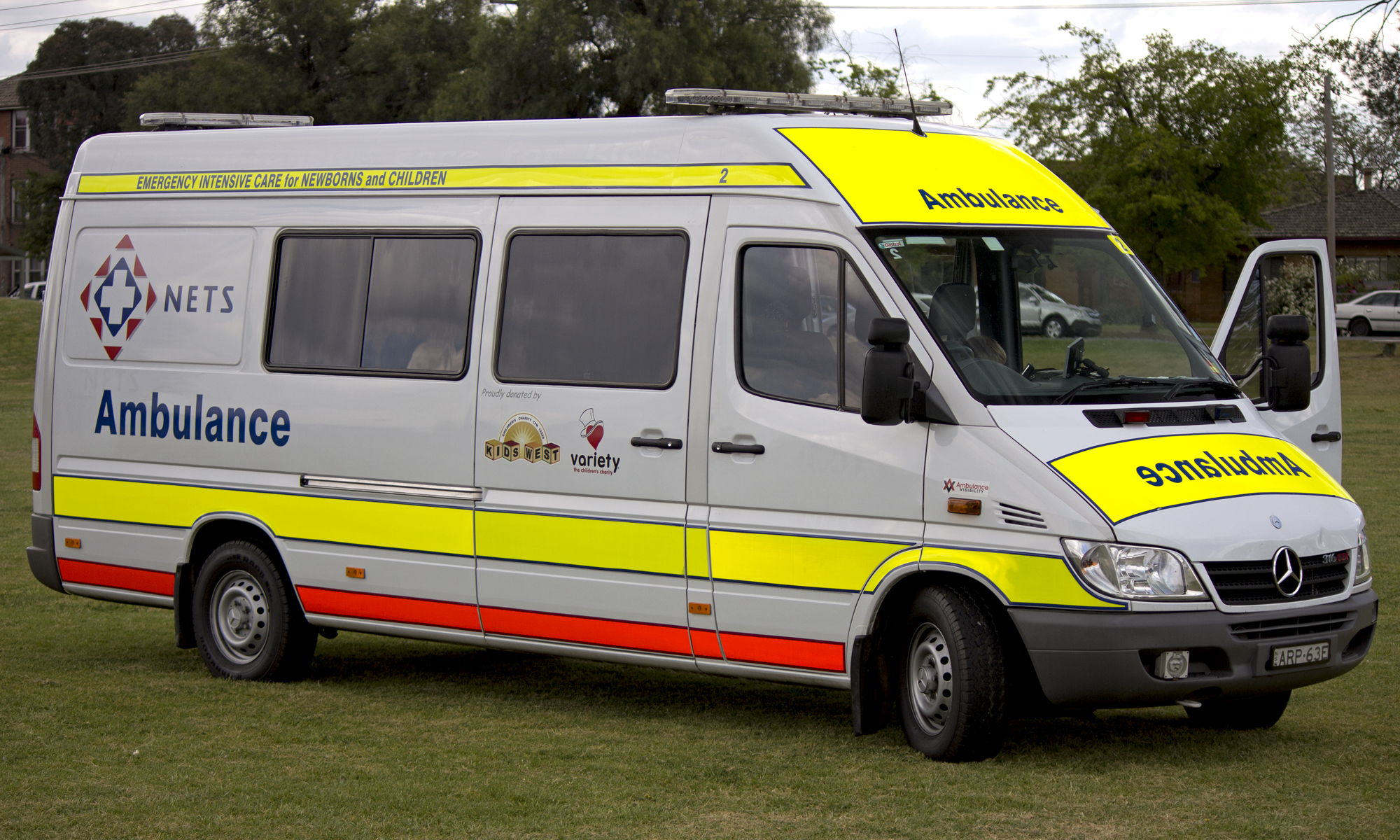
NETS Emergency Intensive Care Ambulance in Wagga Wagga, New South Wales

NETS is an acronym for newborn emergency transport service or system. Such services provide critical care transport for newborn babies requiring care not available in the hospital of birth. Some provide other services; such as outreach education, return transport and coordination of high-risk obstetric transfer. Others provide transport services in older age-groups (infants and children).

== Locations ==
NETS (Virginia) is a service of the University of Virginia Health System in Charlottesville VA (USA). Ground and air vehicles are used to transport sick babies from 30 surrounding hospitals. For emergency transport, call (866) 638 7882 or nICU on (434) 924 2335.

NETS (Victoria) is the emergency transport service for newborn babies in the state of Victoria, parts of southern NSW and northern Tasmania. The base of operations and clinical coordination centre is a combined one incorporating PETS (Paediatric Emergency Transport Service) and PERS (Perinatal Emergency Referral Service) under a new name 'PIPER'. It is located at the Royal Children's Hospital in Parkville. NETS Victoria was previously located at the Royal Women's Hospital. Outreach education services are also provided throughout the state of Victoria. All newborn patients needing intensive care in Victoria are transported to one of 4 neonatal ICUs by NETS (Victoria). Hotline 1300 137 650.

NETS (NSW) is the emergency transport service for babies (and children) for the state of NSW. Starting originally as a service for newborns in 1979, the service expanded to include infants and children in 1995 and now treats and transports older children up to the age of 16 years. The service's clinical coordination centre takes calls from physicians in any of over 240 hospitals and a number of private surgical facilities. Clinical advice is provided and critical care transport teams are launched, as required, by road or air. Newly born patients are moved to one of 10 neonatal ICUs in NSW and the ACT. Infants and children are transported to one of 3 pædiatric ICUs. Calls are also received seeking assistance with emergency transfer of high risk obstetric patients. Clinical conference call techniques are used to make decisions about these obstetric transfers. Medical retrieval teams and a fleet of purpose-built ambulances are housed within the Base to provide rapid response to clinical emergencies. Hotline 1300 362 500. In addition, satellite services operate in the ACT and the Hunter Region of NSW for the transport of newborn infants by road. NETS operates a fleet of 14 ambulances from these three bases.

NETS teams are based in a number of locations in Italy, including Genoa, Rome and plus a further 41 on call services.

QNETS is a service established in Queensland, Australia in 2007 which coordinates hospital-based transport services for newborns, children and maternity cases between hospitals in the southern part of that state.

WA NETS operates in Western Australia. Previously known as WANTS (Western Australia Newborn Transport Service), the newly named (2008) Service continues emergency transport of newborns in WA under the more generic term 'NETS'

== History ==
NETS (Virginia) began in 1975.

NETS (Victoria) was established in 1976 after government reports showed an alarming number of deaths occurring during or after 'mercy dash' transfers of newborn infants by ambulance. The service covered the state of Victoria in southern Australia and pioneered the provision of newborn transport in Australia. In 2011, governance of NETS was transferred to the Royal Children's Hospital where it was amalgamated with the perinatal and paediatric emergency retrieval programs to form PIPER.

NETS (NSW) evolved in the mid 1970s at two hospitals in Sydney and other hospitals progressively developed the capacity for newborn transport in subsequent years. In 1995 separate services based at 5 hospitals were amalgamated to create a single statewide service of NSW Health. As well as newborns, this service also transports infants and children. Since that time, all calls for emergency transport of newborn infants and children throughout NSW (from preterm infants to adolescents) are coordinated by NETS.

PNETS covers the Australian state of Tasmania from a base at the Royal Hobart Hospital in Hobart. It combines paediatric transport with neonatal transport.

== Procedure ==
NETS use conference call techniques to connect calling doctors with one or more specialists relevant to the patient's condition. In this way, all aspects of the clinical problem are canvassed in one phone call without impairing the emergency response of the transport team.

== Vehicles ==
NETS use road ambulances specially fitted out for the task of loading and moving the heavy equipment needed for mobile intensive care. They feature easy loading systems and supplies of medical air as well as oxygen.

NETS Heliport in Sydney

Helicopter transport is provided by CareFlight to NETS NSW and Victorian Air Ambulance to NETS Victoria.

Fixed wing aircraft operated by the RFDS transport NETS teams and equipment over longer distances. International missions use chartered jets, Air Force transport aircraft or commercial airliners.
