= Newborn transport =

Movement of infants for medical purposes

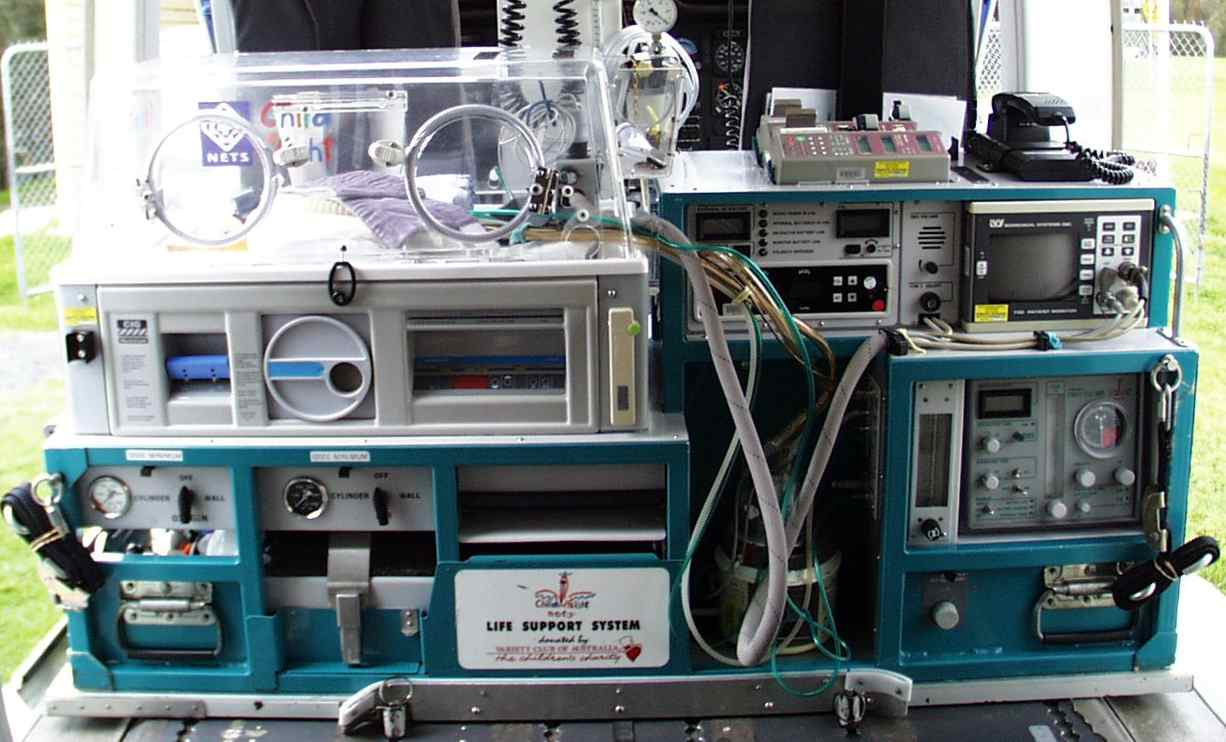
Integrated neonatal life support system

Newborn transport is used to move premature and other sick infants from one hospital to another, such as a medical facility that has a neonatal intensive care unit and other services. Neonatal transport services such as NETS use mobile intensive care incubators fitted with mechanical ventilators, infusion pumps and physiological monitors capable of being used in a mobile environment. These transport systems seek to emulate the environment of a neonatal intensive care and permit uninterrupted care to occur in a referring hospital and then during the journey by road or air ambulance. Power and medical gas supplies are carried within the system as well as making use of external supplies; as available. Infant transport systems commonly weigh over 100 kg and present a challenge to vehicle operators in terms of weight, manual handling, crashworthiness and power consumption.

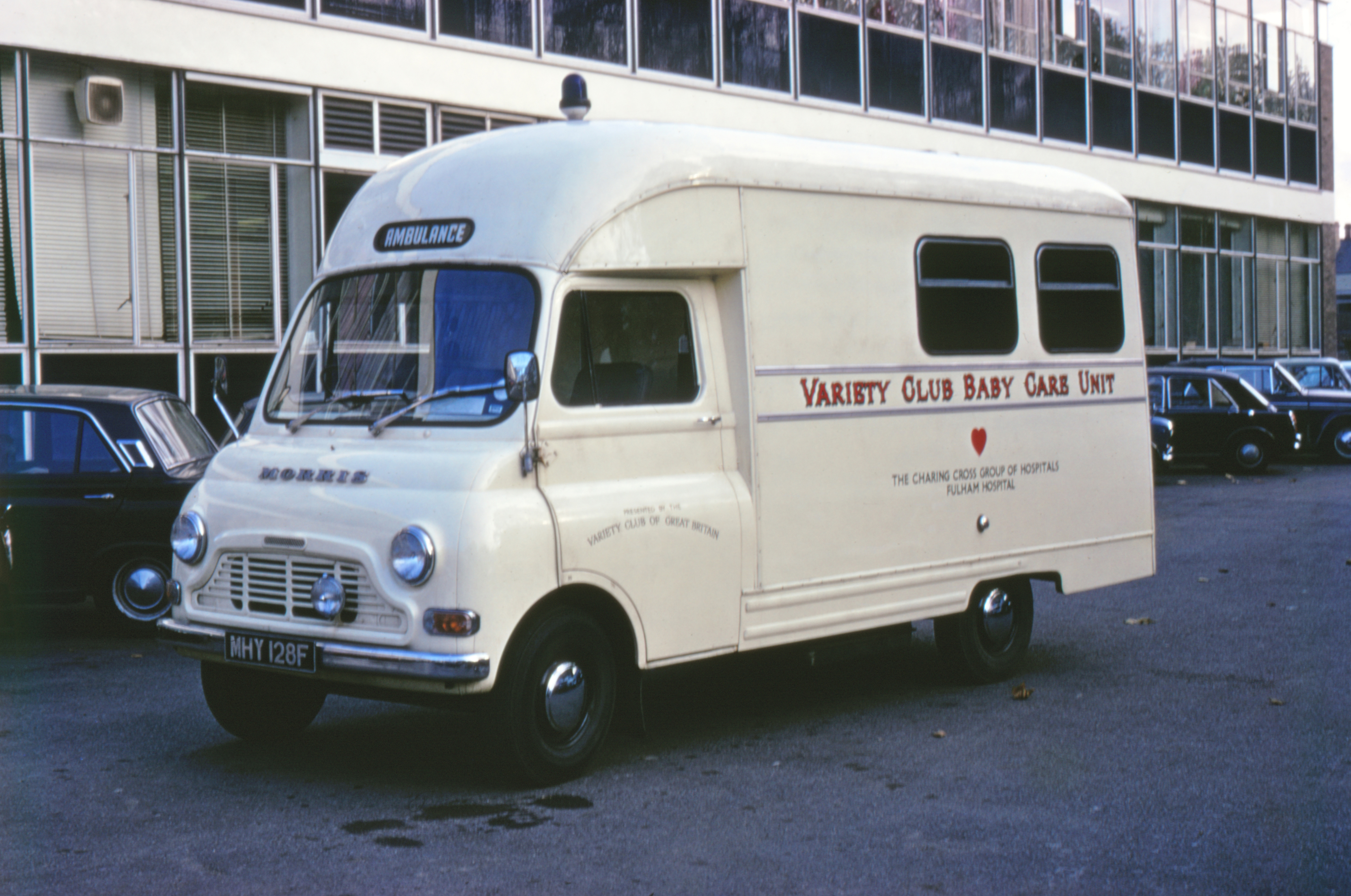
The United Kingdom's first neonatal transport ambulance shown outside Charing Cross Hospital in London (1968). The ambulance was possible thanks to the generosity of the Variety Club charity.

Neonatal transportation was first started by the American physician Joseph Bolivar DeLee (1869 –1942). DeLee showed an intuitive interest in the care of preterm infants, recognising the necessity of a thermo-regulated environment during their transfer. The first organised neonatal transportation program began in New York in 1948 and was called the New York Premature Infant Transport Service. This remarkable system was created more than a decade before Neonatal Intensive Care Units (NICUs) were established, and incorporated many of the main characteristics of the modern neonatal transportation units. In 1968, in the United Kingdom, neonatologist Herbert Barrie introduced the country’s first dedicated neonatal ambulance. Barrie obtained funding from the Variety Club charity for an ambulance that could collect babies requiring intensive care from maternity hospitals and bring them back to the neonatal intensive care unit at Charing Cross Hospital.

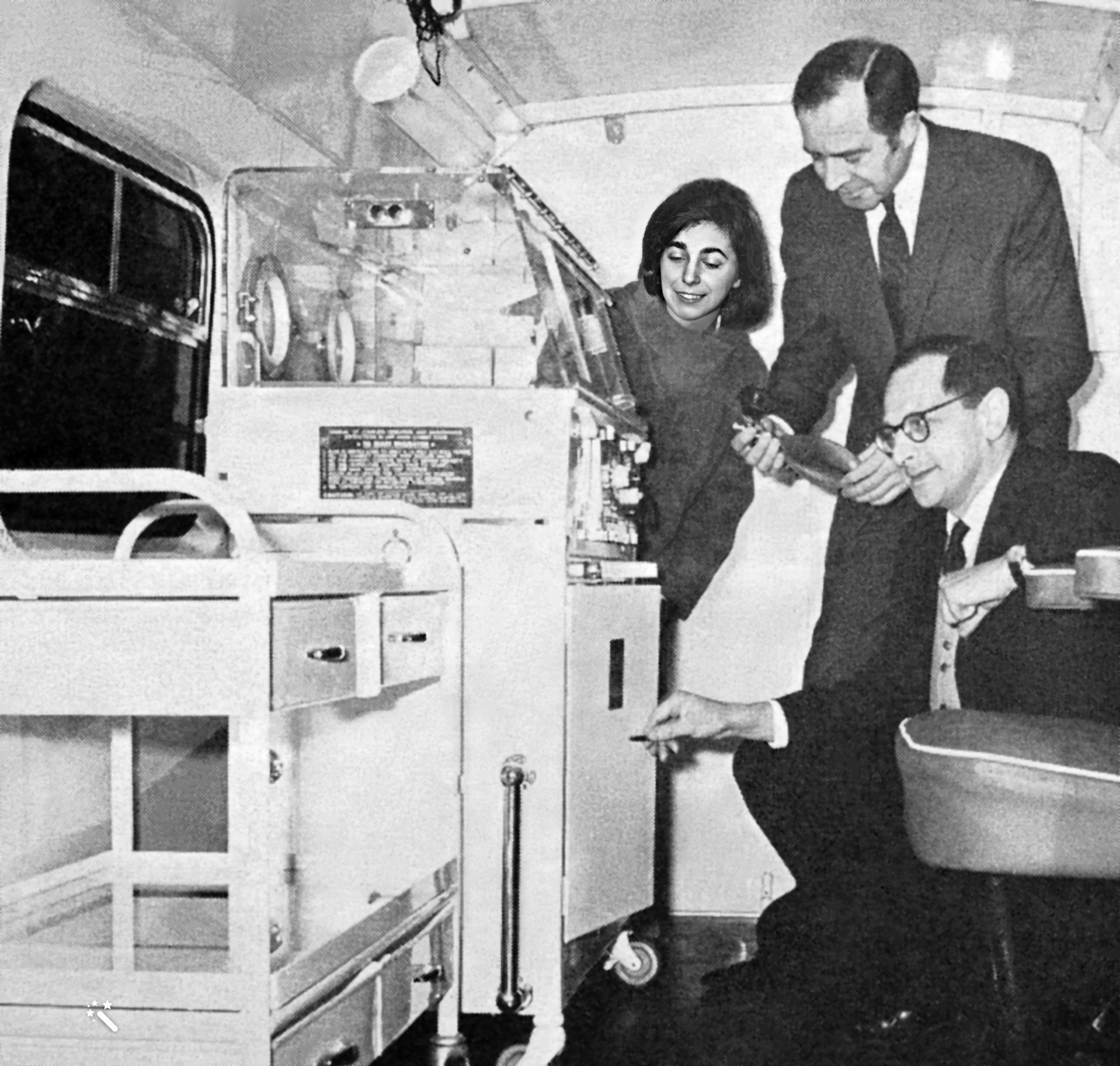
Herbert Barrie taking delivery of the neonatal ambulance, pictured with his senior nurse (Hazel Maycock) and Dr Stanley Balfour-Lynn of the Variety Club.

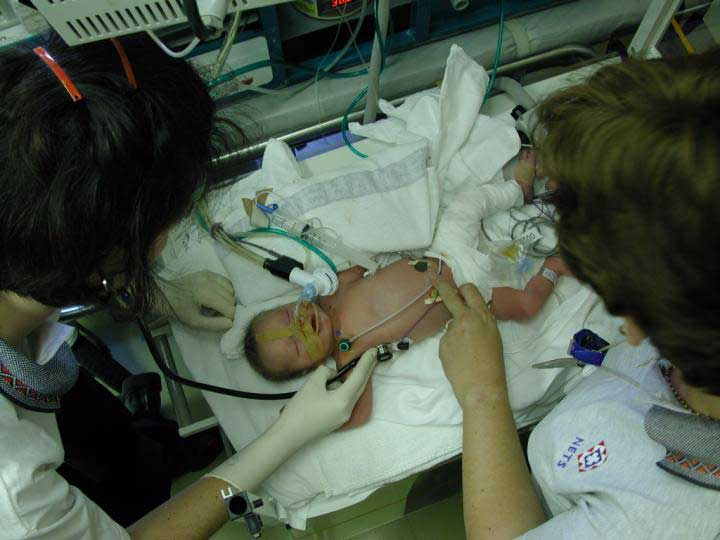
A newborn stabilised and ready for transport

Normally, regular ambulance staff and their vehicles are not equipped to transport sick newborns and special newborn transport teams are provided from either particular hospitals (hospital-based) or established to serve many hospitals (regionally based). Team composition varies from one country to another, with options including various two or three person combinations of nurse, doctor and respiratory therapist. Access to neonatal transport also varies, particularly in developing countries.

Typically, newborn transport teams spend some time stabilizing a baby's condition prior to transport. Without adequate stabilisation, a clinical deterioration en route may occur.

Wherever possible (and safe), in utero transfer is generally preferable to newborn transport. Transfer of the mother while still pregnant leads to improved survival and quality of survival for the baby.
