= Neonatal jaundice =

- Other names: Neonatal hyperbilirubinemia, neonatal icterus, jaundice in newborns
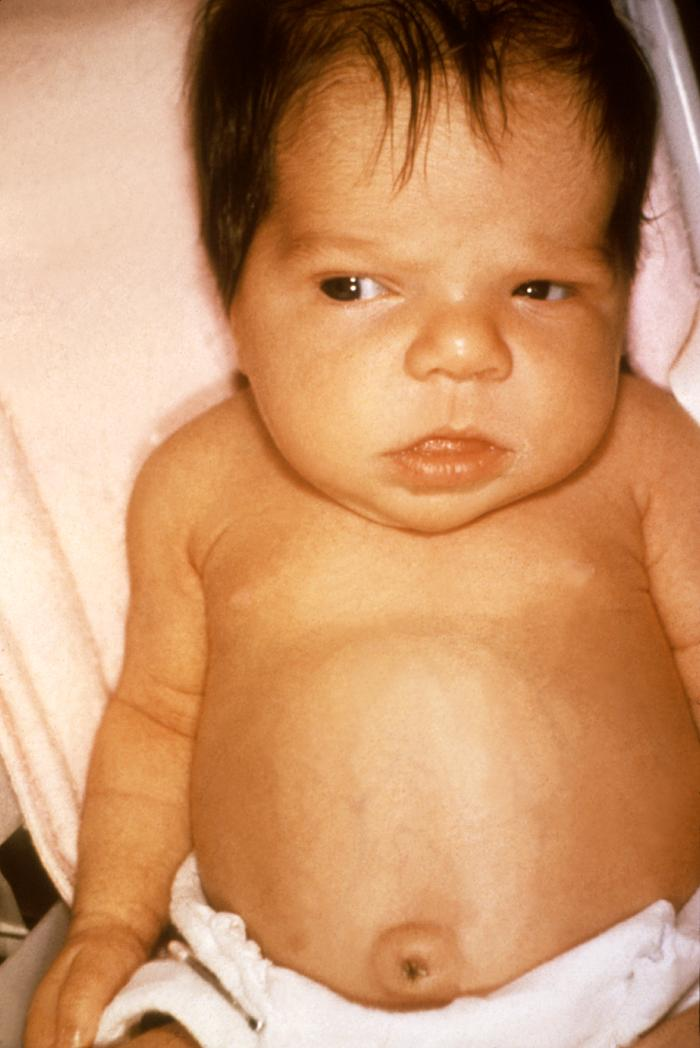
- Jaundice in a newborn
- Specialty: Pediatrics
- Symptoms: Yellowish discoloration of the skin and white part of the eyes
- Complications: Seizures, cerebral palsy, kernicterus
- Usual onset: Newborns
- Types: Physiologic, pathologic
- Causes: Red blood cell breakdown, liver disease, infection, hypothyroidism, metabolic disordersHepatomegaly (rare)
- Diagnostic method: Based on symptoms, confirmed by bilirubin
- Treatment: More frequent feeding, phototherapy, exchange transfusions
- Frequency: >50% of babies

Neonatal jaundice, clinically known as neonatal hyperbilirubinemia and icterus neonatorum, is the yellowish discoloration of the white part of the eyes (sclerae) and skin in newborn infants caused by an elevated concentration of bilirubin in the blood (hyperbilirubinemia). It is one of the most frequently encountered medical conditions in the neonatal period, affecting approximately 60% of term and 80% preterm newborns within the first week of life. Globally, over 100,000 late-preterm and term babies die each year as a result of jaundice, particularly in low- and middle-income countries.

Bilirubin is a yellow-orange pigment naturally produced during the breakdown of red blood cells. While mild jaundice in newborns is generally harmless and self-resolving, elevated bilirubin levels, if left untreated, can cross the blood-brain barrier to cause permanent neurological damage. The condition is known as kernicterus or chronic bilirubin encephalopathy (CBE).

Neonatal jaundice has been described in medical literature for centuries. The severe, often fatal form, known in Latin as icterus gravis neonatorum, was recognized long before its cause was understood. The discovery that phototherapy could treat jaundice is credited to a nurse at Rochford General Hospital, England, in 1965, who noticed that infants exposed to sunlight had less jaundice. This observation led to the landmark 1968 Pediatrics publication by Lucey et al., establishing phototherapy as an effective treatment.

In most cases, there is a specific underlying physiologic disorder. With modern universal bilirubin screening, phototherapy, and exchange transfusion, the incidence of severe complications has been dramatically reduced.

== Diagnosis ==
The primary symptom is yellowish discoloration of the white part of the eyes and skin in a newborn baby. Other symptoms may include excess sleepiness or poor feeding.

Given the high incidence, babies can be screened for this condition. Commonly, a transcutaneous bilirubinometer (TcB) is used to evaluate the bilirubin levels initially. It is a handheld, portable, and rechargeable device. When pressure is applied to the photoprobe, a xenon tube generates a strobe light, and this light passes through the subcutaneous tissue. The reflected light returns through the second fiber optic bundle to the spectrophotometric module. The intensity of the yellow color in this light, after correcting for the hemoglobin, is measured and instantly displayed. The TcB correlates well with serum bilirubin levels but has important limitations: inaccuracies in individuals with varying melanin pigments, unreliable once phototherapy has been initiated, when TcB >15 mg/dL.

Universal bilirubin screening at time of birth and within 48 hours of discharge form a cornerstone for jaundice prevention. In those born after 35 weeks who are more than one day old, TcB may be used as an initial step. Bilirubin level greater than 34 μmol/L (2 mg/dL) may result in visible skin discoloration. As bilirubin levels rise, jaundice follows a predictable head-to-toe pattern: face ~ 4-8 mg/dL, trunk/upper chest ~ 10 mg/dL, abdomen ~ 12 mg/dL and for palms/soles > 255 μmol /L (>15 mg/dL). However, concerns arise when bilirubin levels exceed 308 μmol/L (18 mg/dL) in an otherwise healthy baby. Though, bilirubin value cannot and should not be interpreted in isolation. Equally critical are the age of the infant in hours from delivery and hour specific bilirubin nomograms. Analyzing the two allow for risk stratification and guide follow-up timing. The standard values in newborns are higher than those of adult serum values and must be interpreted using age-specific nomograms.

Formal diagnosis is made by measuring the serum bilirubin level in the blood (TsB) with fractioning the bilirubin into indirect (unconjugated) and direct (conjugated) components. Common causes to warrant further evaluation are clinical jaundice within the first 24 hours of life, clinical jaundice persisting beyond 14 days of life, rapid rise in total bilirubin, elevated total bilirubin, elevated direct/conjugated bilirubin, or additional concerning symptoms.

== Bilirubin metabolism ==
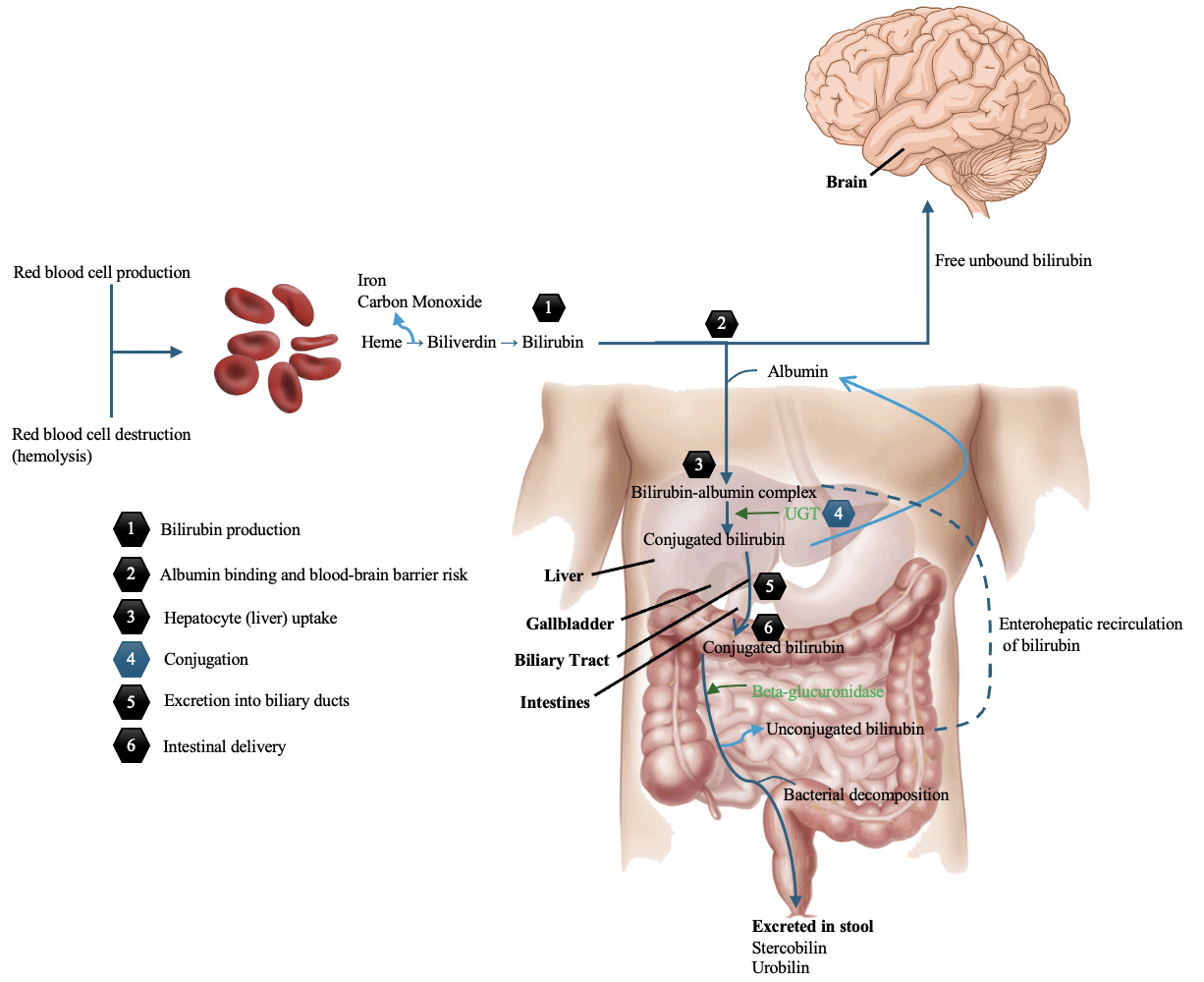
Pathway of bilirubin from the breakdown through recycling or excretion.

=== Bilirubin production ===
The breakdown of heme from hemoglobin is initiated when it is converted to biliverdin while releasing iron and carbon monoxide. The iron is conserved for reuse, whereas carbon monoxide is excreted through the lungs. This can be measured in a patient’s breath to quantify the bilirubin production if needed.

In comparison to adults, neonates have a shorter red blood cell life span (~80 to 90 days compared to ~100 to 120 days) and higher red blood cell mass. This combination substantially increases the rate of bilirubin production in newborns relative to older children and adults.

Water-soluble biliverdin is reduced to bilirubin, which is almost insoluble in water due to the intramolecular hydrogen. Therefore, as the serum is an aqueous solution at neutral pH, bilirubin does not dissolve in water but rather is soluble in lipids if left unbound. The unconjugated bilirubin is released into the plasma.

=== Albumin binding and blood-brain barrier risk ===
Because of the highly hydrophobic nature of bilirubin, it has a great binding affinity for albumin in the plasma. Therefore, under normal conditions, there is essentially no free unconjugated/indirect bilirubin in the plasma, they are all bound to the present albumin.

When the ratio of bilirubin to albumin exceeds 7, as in there are more than 7 bilirubin molecules for every 1 albumin molecule, binding is saturated. Also, some drugs may compete with bilirubin for albumin binding (e.g., ceftriaxone).

If the unconjugated/indirect bilirubin is not bound to albumin, its free state is lipid soluble and can be freely transported across the blood-brain barrier and deposited in the basal ganglia and brainstem nuclei, causing bilirubin-induced neurologic dysfunction (BIND).

This risk is compounded in neonates, who already have an underdeveloped blood-brain barrier and decreased albumin binding capacity. When further combined with certain conditions, such as acidosis, hypercarbia, and hyperosmolality, the permeability of bilirubin can further increase, leading to deposits in the brain.

=== Hepatocyte uptake ===
The permeability of hepatic sinusoids (coming off the portal vein/artery) allows for the albumin-bilirubin complex to enter through both passive diffusion and receptor-mediated endocytosis. However, this process is inherently inefficient, which allows only ~20% of the complexes to be cleared in the first pass. Thus, there is always a measurable concentration of unconjugated/indirect bilirubin bound to albumin leaving the liver through the venous circulation.

As the complex enters the space of Disse within the hepatocyte, the bilirubin is immediately unbound from albumin, allowing the albumin to return into circulation and the unconjugated/indirect bilirubin to enter the hepatic endoplasmic reticulum.

=== Conjugation ===
Within the hepatic endoplasmic reticulum, the enzyme uridine diphosphate glucuronosyl transferase (UGT) conjugates bilirubin with glucuronic acid. Most of the bilirubin undergoes glucuronidation twice: ~20% monoglucuronides (BMG) and ~80% biclucuronides (BDG).

This is a pivotal rate-limiting step in bilirubin metabolism. Before this step, the bilirubin is unconjugated and unable to enter the biliary circulation, giving rise to its name of unconjugated bilirubin. After the rate-limiting step, the bilirubin is conjugated and capable of being actively transported into the biliary ducts through the specific transporter MRP2.

Additionally, neonates have decreased UGT activity compared to grown adults by about 30%, gradually rising to adult capacity by ~14 weeks of age. This is due to UGT downregulation before birth, as bilirubin must remain unconjugated to cross the placenta to prevent accumulation in the fetus.

Inherited disorders of UGT activity include Crigler-Najjar syndrome Type I (complete absence of UGT requiring daily phototherapy), Crigler-Najjar syndrome Type II (marked reduced UGT activity, which may be responsive to phenobarbital), and Gilbert syndrome (moderate reduction in UGT activity, ~30% of normal, presenting with recurrent mild unconjugated hyperbilirubinemia triggered by fasting, dehydration, or illness).

=== Excretion into biliary ducts ===
The conjugated bilirubin product is now water-soluble and can be excreted in the bile through a transporter protein, MRP2, which is unable to transport unconjugated bilirubin. Mutations in MRP2 underlie Dubin-Johnson syndrome.

Bile primarily functions to eliminate bilirubin and other lipophilic waste and emulsifies dietary fats.

=== Intestinal delivery ===
As the conjugated bilirubin travels from the biliary tract through the small intestine, it remains intact. In the large intestines in adults, the gut bacteria further reduce the conjugated bilirubin into urobilin and stercobilin for excretion, imparting the characteristic brown color of stool. Alternatively, as the gut is essentially sterile in neonates at birth, far less conjugated bilirubin is converted to urobilin. Instead, beta-glucuronidase in the intestines deconjugates bilirubin, which is reabsorbed and recycled. This process is known as enterohepatic circulation and is amplified by decreased stooling (can be from poor oral intake, ileus, meconium plug, etc.) and is a major contributor to physiologic neonatal hyperbilirubinemia.

Also, when bilirubin is unable to be delivered to the intestines, such as in a biliary obstruction, particularly biliary atresia, acholic (pale/white) stools are seen clinically.

== Causes ==
Severe neonatal jaundice may indicate the presence of other conditions contributing to the elevated bilirubin levels, of which there are a large variety of possibilities. These should be detected or excluded as part of the differential diagnosis to prevent the development of complications. They can be grouped into the following categories:

- Unconjugated/Indirect Bilirubin Conditions
  - Physiological conditions
    - Physiologic Jaundice of Newborns
      - Physiologic jaundice is an expected finding in virtually all neonates, arising from normal neonatal bilirubin metabolism.
        - Neonates have a higher red blood cell mass and a shorter red blood cell lifespan (~80 days vs. ~120 days in adults), increasing bilirubin production.
        - The neonatal liver has immature UGT enzyme activity, reducing the capacity to conjugate and clear bilirubin.
        - The neonatal gut contains fewer bacteria, so more conjugated bilirubin is deconjugated by the enzyme beta-glucuronidase and reabsorbed — a process known as enterohepatic circulation.
        - Bilirubin can cross the placenta from fetus to mother for elimination in utero; once born, the newborn must rely entirely on its own immature metabolic machinery.
      - Typically appears after the first 24 hours of life and peaks between days 3 and 5 (or up to day 7 in East Asian infants), and resolves within two weeks in term infants. Total serum bilirubin (TsB) generally does not exceed 12 mg/dL, though levels up to 17 mg/dL may be seen with multiple risk factors.
      - Follows two functionally distinct phases. Phase 1: Rapid rise. In term infants, TsB may rise to 204 μmol/L (12 mg/dL) over approximately 10 days; preterm infants may reach 255 μmol/L (15 mg/dL) over approximately two weeks. Phase 2: Decline. Bilirubin falls to approximately 34 μmol/L (2 mg/dL) over two weeks, eventually reaching adult values. This phase may extend beyond one month in preterm or exclusively breastfed infants.
  - Pathological Conditions
    - Hemolytic: breakdown of red blood cells (RBCs)
      - Intrinsic causes of hemolysis: RBCs breakdown due to RBC abnormalities
        - Membrane conditions: abnormal RBC shape
          - Spherocytosis
          - Hereditary elliptocytosis
        - Globin synthesis defect
          - Sickle cell disease
          - Alpha-thalassemia, e.g. HbH disease
        - Enzyme conditions
          - Glucose-6-phosphate dehydrogenase deficiency (also called G6PD deficiency)
          - Pyruvate kinase deficiency
          - Congenital erythropoietic porphyria (CEP, also called Morbus Günther; Uroporphyrinogen III Synthase deficiency)
      - Other non-immune causes of increased bilirubin production
        - Systemic conditions
          - Sepsis
          - Polycythemia
        - Sequestration of blood
          - Cephalohematoma
          - Subgaleal hemorrhage
        - Antibody-mediated (Alloimmunity) Neonate or cord blood gives a positive direct Coombs test, and maternal blood gives a positive indirect Coombs test
          - Hemolytic disease of the newborn (ABO)
          - Rh disease
            - Once was a leading cause of severe hemolytic jaundice, but has now been virtually eliminated in developed countries from routine maternal Rh blood typing and prophylactic Rho(D) immune globulin (RhoGAM) administration at 28 weeks gestation, at delivery and with any invasive procedures where fetal-maternal blood transfer occurs.
          - Hemolytic disease of the newborn (anti-Kell)
          - Hemolytic disease of the newborn (anti-Rhc)
          - Other blood type mismatches causing hemolytic disease of the newborn
    - Non-hemolytic causes
      - Increased enterohepatic circulation
        - Breastfeeding (chestfeeding) jaundice
          - "Breastfeeding jaundice" (or "lack of breastfeeding jaundice") is caused by insufficient breast milk intake, resulting in inadequate quantities of bowel movements to remove bilirubin from the body. This leads to increased enterohepatic circulation, resulting in increased reabsorption of bilirubin from the intestines. Usually occurring in the first week of life, most cases can be ameliorated by frequent breastfeeding sessions of sufficient duration to stimulate adequate milk production. Management centers on increasing feeding frequency (at least 8–10 feeds per day), optimizing latch, and supporting milk production. Formula supplementation may be necessary if bilirubin levels continue to rise.
        - Breast milk jaundice
          - The etiology of breast milk jaundice remains unclear. Proposed mechanisms include increased intestinal reabsorption of bilirubin and genetic variation affecting bilirubin conjugation; a previously proposed role for pregnanediol-mediated inhibition of hepatic UGT has been disproven.
          - Jaundice to appear after the first 5–7 days and possibly persist for several weeks to months. This late-onset jaundice may develop in up to one third of healthy breastfed infants. Breastfeeding should generally be continued.
        - Gastrointestinal obstruction
          - Pyloric stenosis
          - Hirschprung disease
          - Intestinal atresia
          - Meconium ileus/plug
      - Impaired bilirubin conjugation
        - Crigler–Najjar syndrome
        - Gilbert's syndrome
        - Hypothyroidism
        - Prematurity
        - Maternal diabetes
- Conjugated/Direct Bilirubin Conditions
  - Hepatic Causes
    - Impaired excretion
      - Dubin–Johnson syndrome
      - Rotor syndrome
    - Infections
      - Hepatitis A
      - Hepatitis B
      - TORCH infections
      - Sepsis
      - Urinary tract infection
    - Metabolic
      - Galactosemia
      - Alpha 1-antitrypsin deficiency
      - Cystic fibrosis
      - Genetic disorders of bile acid synthesis or transport
    - Other
      - Drugs
        - Ceftriaxone
        - Oral contraceptive pills
      - Total parenteral nutrition
  - Post-Hepatic Causes
    - Cholestasis: poor circulation of bile acid through the biliary tract
      - Biliary atresia
      - Bile duct obstruction
      - Alagille syndrome
      - Choledochal cyst
      - Neonatal cholestasis

== Management ==
Management depends on the bilirubin level, rate of rise, age of the newborn in hours, time since birth, and the underlying cause. Initial measures focus on optimizing feeding frequency and ensuring adequate stooling to reduce enterohepatic circulation. Supplemental water or dextrose is not recommended, as it reduces breast milk production and may cause hyponatremia. Glycerin suppositories may be used to promote stooling and increase bilirubin excretion. Three nomograms guide clinical decision-making: the risk nomogram (pre-discharge risk stratification), the phototherapy nomogram, and the exchange transfusion nomogram.

The AAP 2022 guidelines provide gestational age-specific thresholds for initiating phototherapy based on postnatal age in hours, TsB level, and the presence of neurotoxicity risk factors. They also state any newborn with a total serum bilirubin greater than 359 μmol/L (21 mg/dL) should receive phototherapy.

=== Phototherapy ===
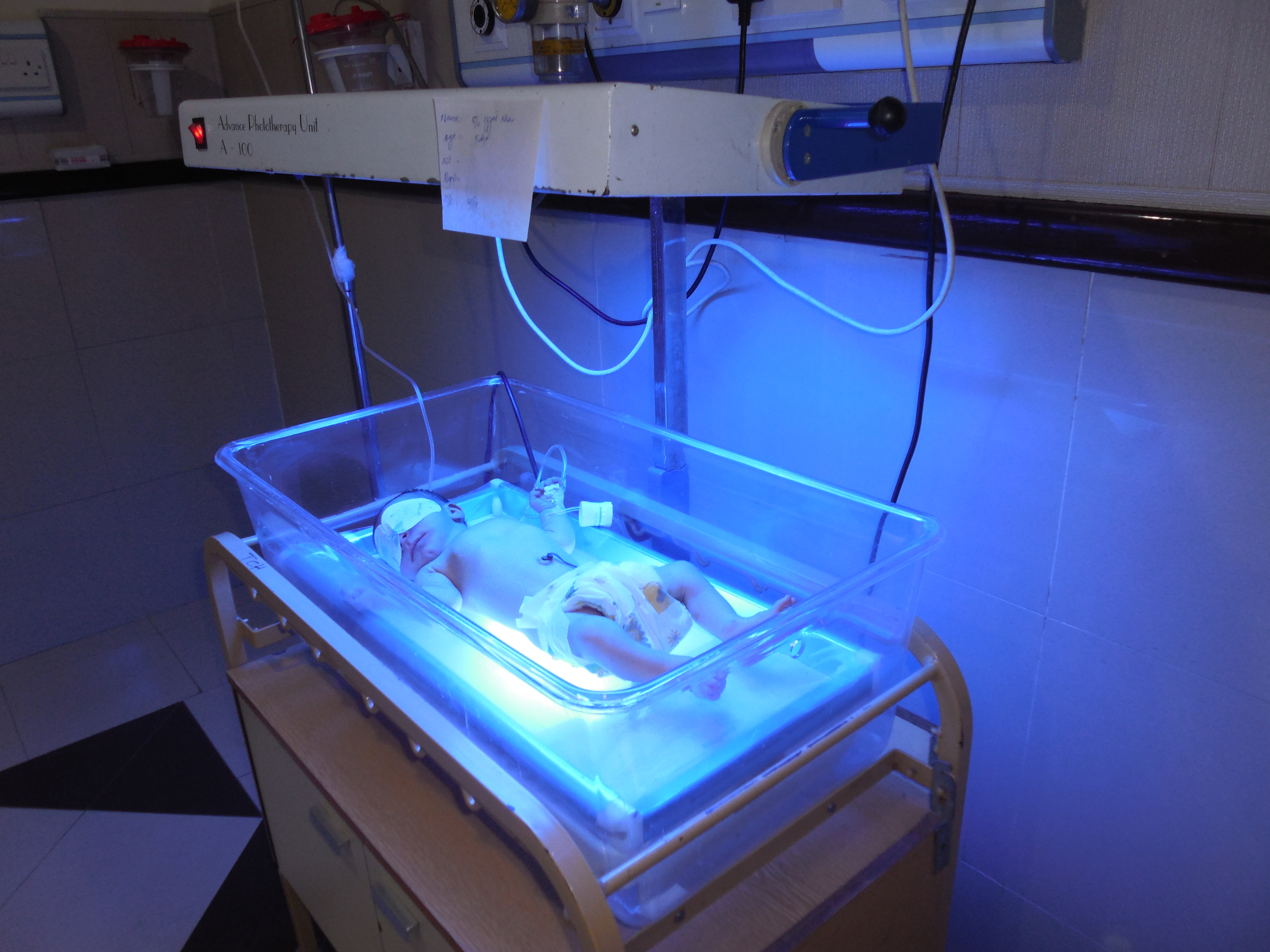
Phototherapy is the main treatment of neonatal jaundice

Babies with neonatal jaundice may be treated with colored light called phototherapy, blue-green light (wavelength 460–490 nm). The light works by converting unconjugated trans-bilirubin in the skin into the water-soluble cis-bilirubin isomer which can be excreted in bile and urine, bypassing the hepatic conjugation step. With intensive phototherapy, TSB should fall by 1–2 mg/dL within 4–6 hours.

The phototherapy involved is not ultraviolet light therapy but rather a specific frequency of blue light. The light can be applied with overhead lamps, which means that the baby's eyes need to be covered, or with a device called a biliblanket, which sits under the baby's clothing close to its skin.

The use of phototherapy was first discovered, accidentally, at Rochford Hospital in Essex, England, when a nurse, Sister Jean Ward, noticed that babies exposed to sunlight had reduced jaundice, and a pathologist, Dr. Perryman, who noticed that a vial of blood left in the sun had turned green. Drs Cremer, Richards and Dobbs put together these observations, leading to a landmark randomized clinical trial which was published in Pediatrics in 1968; it took another ten years for the practice to become established. Massage therapy could be useful in addition to phototherapy in order to reduce the phototherapy duration. However, it does not appear to reduce the requirement for phototherapy in the treatment of neonatal jaundice.

Recent studies from several countries show that phototherapy can safely and effectively be performed in the family's home, and since 2022 home phototherapy is recommended as an alternative to readmission to hospital in the American national guidelines. However, there have been several reports about the possible relationship between neonatal phototherapy and the increased risk of future cancer. A recent systematic review has found that there may be a statistically significant association between phototherapy and various hematopoietic cancers (especially myeloid leukemia).

=== Exchange transfusions ===
Much like with phototherapy the level at which exchange transfusion should occur depends on the health status and age of the newborn. It should however be used for any newborn with a total serum bilirubin of greater than 428 μmol/L (25 mg/dL ). It is the most rapid method for lowering bilirubin and is the treatment of choice for symptomatic infants with moderate or advanced ABE. Given higher risks for exchange transfusion, it should only be undertaken after intensive phototherapy has failed or when urgent intervention is clinically indicated. The procedure removes bilirubin-laden and antibody-coated red blood cells and replaces them with donor blood, rapidly lowering bilirubin by approximately 50%.

== Complications ==
When presented in excess of the albumin binding capacity, unconjugated bilirubin poses as a danger as it can cross the blood brain barrier and deposit in the basal ganglia and brainstem nuclei causing neurotoxicity.

Early signs of acute bilirubin encephalopathy (ABE) include lethargy, poor feeding, and hypotonia. As the condition progresses, infants may develop a high-pitched cry, neck and back arching (opisthotonus), fever, and seizures. Early recognition and treatment can reverse these changes.

If untreated, acute encephalopathy may evolve into kernicterus from untreated or inadequately treated ABE which causes irreversible brain damage. However, the Joint Commission considers kernicterus to be a preventable sentinel event. The risk is rare in term infants even at bilirubin levels of 25 mg/dL, but substantially higher in preterm infants with a less secure blood-brain barrier and lower albumin levels.

Rarely, if phototherapy is done in the presence of hepatic dysfunction with elevated direct bilirubin levels, Bronze baby syndrome can develop. It is a harmless and self-resolving but cosmetically unappealing complication in which the skin, serum and urin acquire a dark grayish brown discoloration. It underscores the importance of evaluating the bilirubin fractions prior to phototherapy initiation.

== Research ==
Penicillamine was studied in the 1970s in hyperbilirubinemia due to ABO hemolytic disease. While tin mesoporphyrin IX may decrease bilirubin such use is not recommended in babies. Preclinical studies have looked at minocycline to help prevent neurotoxicity. Clofibrate may decrease the duration of phototherapy. Evidence as of 2012 however is insufficient to recommend its use.
