= Bili light =

Medical therapeutic tool to treat newborn jaundice

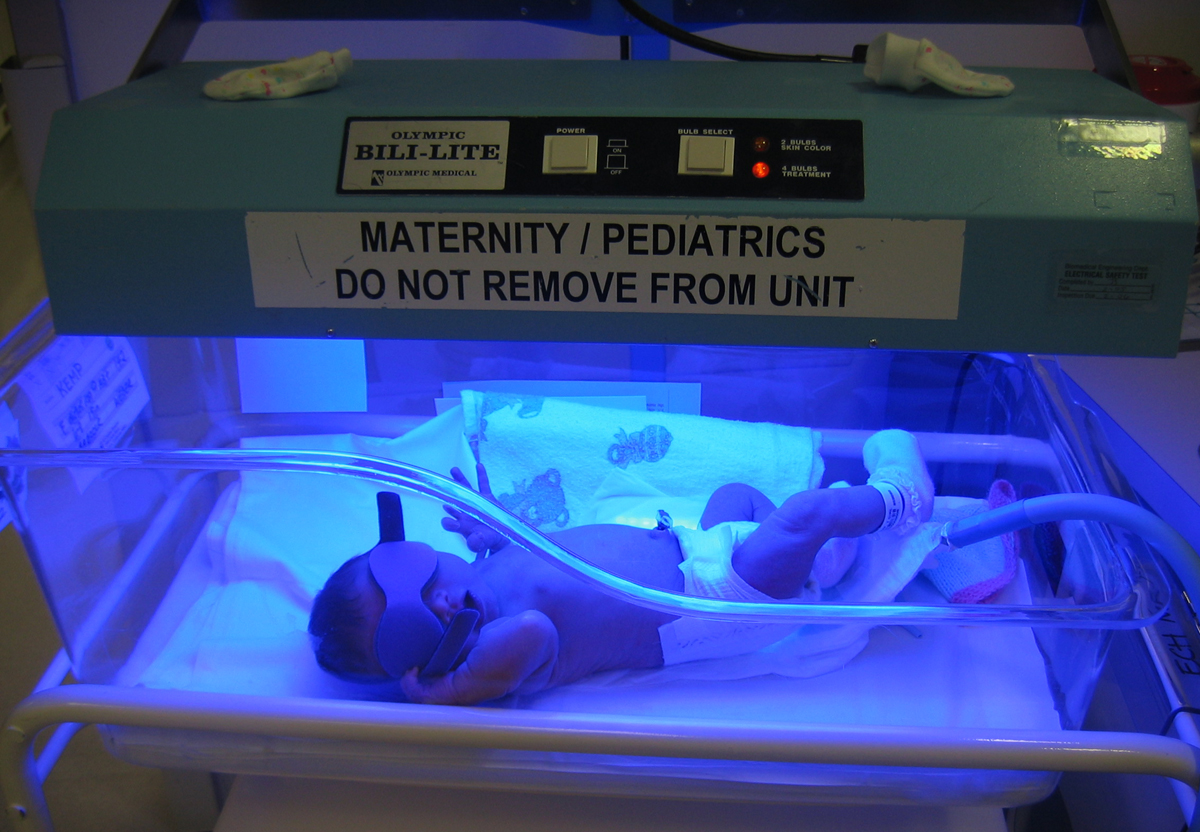
Infant undergoing bili light therapy in a United States maternity ward.

A bili light is a light therapy tool to treat newborn jaundice (hyperbilirubinemia). High levels of bilirubin can cause brain damage (kernicterus), leading to cerebral palsy, auditory neuropathy, gaze abnormalities and dental enamel hypoplasia. The therapy uses a blue light (420–470 nm) that converts bilirubin into an (E,Z)-isomer that can be excreted in the urine and feces. Soft goggles are put on the child to reduce eye damage from the high intensity light. The baby is kept naked or only wearing a diaper, and is turned over frequently to expose more of the skin.

Conventional bili lights shine from above the baby. A biliblanket consists of a fiber-optic blanket designed to transfer the light from a lamp unit all around the baby's body, and is more commonly used at home.

== Neonatal jaundice ==
Jaundice (Hyperbilirubinemia) is common in newborn babies and presents itself as yellow discoloration of the skin and whites of the eyes (sclera). About 50 percent of term and 80 percent of preterm infants develop jaundice in the first week of life. This condition also causes babies to appear sick, experience difficulty waking up, make high-pitch cries, or not be able to be fed or gain weight. Bilirubin is an orange yellow bile pigment that is produced as a byproduct of hemoglobin as red blood cells break down (hemolysis). Bilirubin is then metabolized in the liver, recycled, and excreted in the bowel movements. When a baby has jaundice or hyperbilirubinemia, this can indicate that the baby's body is producing excess bilirubin or that the liver is too immature to be able to eliminate bilirubin fast enough. Feeding, in particular breastfeeding, the baby often in the first few days of birth can help lower the chances of developing jaundice, since the baby will pass more stool and the milk provides energy to the liver to allow metabolism of bilirubin. Uncontrolled levels of bilirubin can be harmful to the baby. Most neonatal jaundice shows during the first week after birth. Nevertheless, when bilirubin levels become exceedingly high, the substance may move out of the blood, cross the blood brain barrier, and collect in brain tissue, damaging the baby's brain cells, a condition known as acute bilirubin encephalopathy. If acute bilirubin encephalopathy is not addressed promptly, Kernicterus syndrome can develop and cause permanent brain damage. In rare situations, a baby may experience seizures, deafness, cerebral palsy or mental retardation. Jaundice can be prevented and treated in the majority of cases. Jaundice is more dangerous in certain cases such as babies who are born prematurely (before 37 weeks of gestation), babies who are underweight (less than 2500 grams at birth), babies who are going through an infection, babies who experienced a difficult delivery or have bruises (since they are replacing and breaking down more red blood cells at a higher rate) and babies who have a blood group that is not compatible with their mothers.

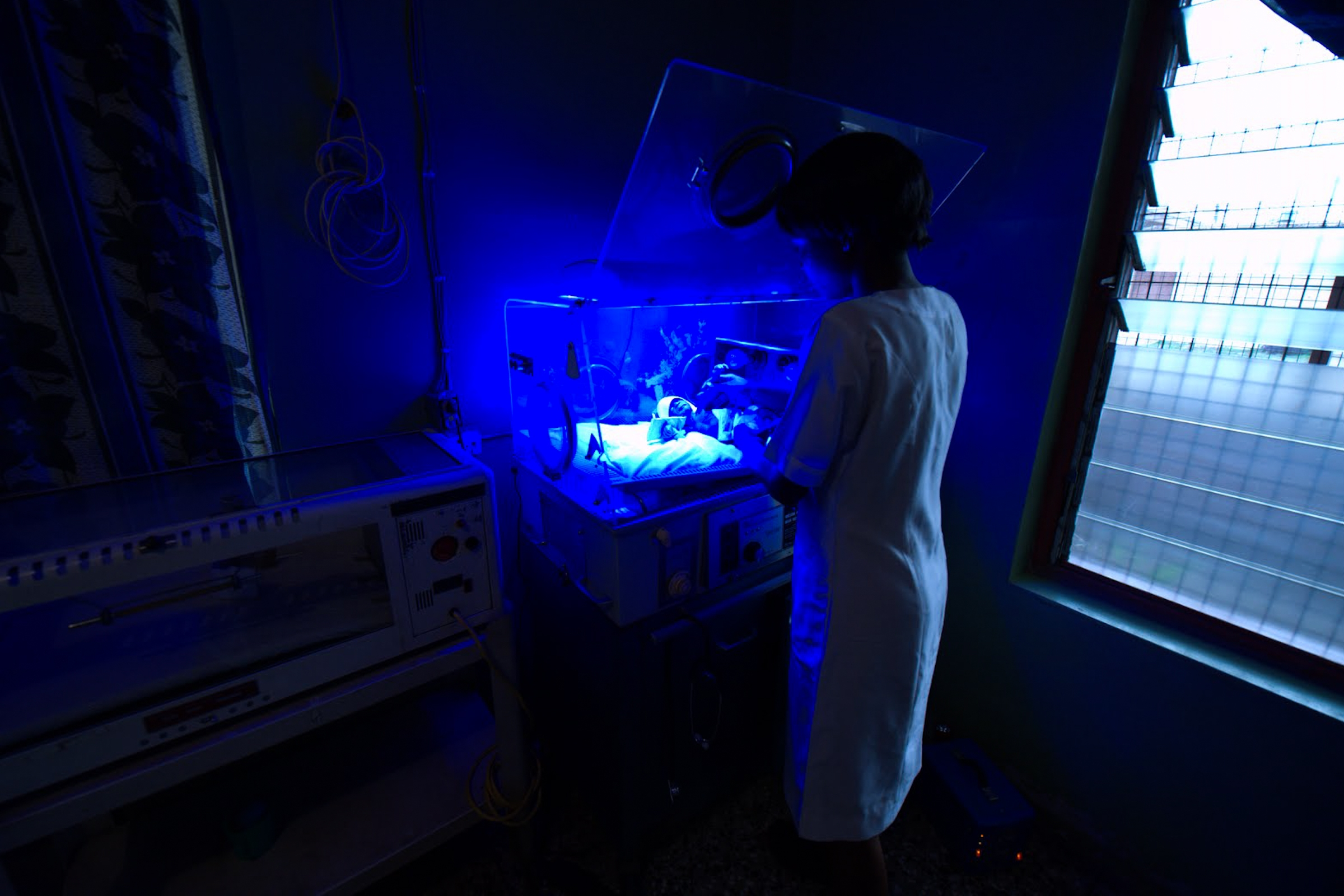
Infant receiving blue-light phototherapy for jaundice in a neonatal intensive care unit in Nigeria.

== Phototherapy mechanism ==
Jaundice in some babies can disappear within one to two weeks without treatment; however for babies with more severe jaundice, treatment is required. Traditional phototherapy devices include blue LEDs, halogen white light, and fluorescent tubes. A biliblanket is a phototherapy home treatment that consists of a portable illuminator and fiber-optic pad. It uses a pad of woven fibers to transfer light to a baby in order to treat neonatal jaundice (hyperbilirubimia). It uses visible light to transform bilirubin into a more water-soluble form that allows it to dissolve easily in water and be eliminated. This therapy lowers the serum bilirubin level. The baby is placed on the fiber-optic pad, which has a disposable cover in direct contact with the baby's skin. This fiber-optic pad exposes the skin to light, and bilirubin is eliminated when light is absorbed. The biliblanket releases waves of blue or white light, when these are absorbed in the skin, bilirubin breaks down and is eliminated from the baby's blood stream.

This lowers the yellowing effect in the baby's eyes and skin. Afterwards, blood needs to be tested to observe bilirubin levels and decide whether the biliblanket is still needed. The majority of babies that need a biliblanket use it for several days, but it depends on each baby's condition. Even though a biliblanket may cause loose stools and skin rashes, it is considered safe for the most part. This device is mostly used for 2 to 3 days only. In severe situations, intravenous fluids may be needed to be given to the patient.

Phototherapy uses photons of energy that are infused and absorbed by bilirubin located in superficial capillaries and subcutaneous tissues and interstitial spaces of the skin. Photochemical reactions then transform bilirubin into nontoxic isomers that are more polar, water-soluble and therefore, can be excreted without being further metabolized by the liver. Urinary and gastrointestinal elimination remain important to the process of reducing the bilirubin load.

== Side effects ==
One common side effect that is experienced by babies who are receiving phototherapy treatment is more frequent and loose stools. The color of these stools are usually a greenish color; however, this is normal because that is the way bilirubin is removed from the body. As bilirubin levels return to normal and phototherapy is no longer needed, the frequency of bowel movements and the color of the stools will return to normal. More severe long term side effects are very rare or non existent but there could be a correlation with conditions such as allergy/asthma, patent ductus arteriosus and retinopathy of prematurity. There is no statistical evidence that phototherapy causes melanoma.

== Biliblanket ==
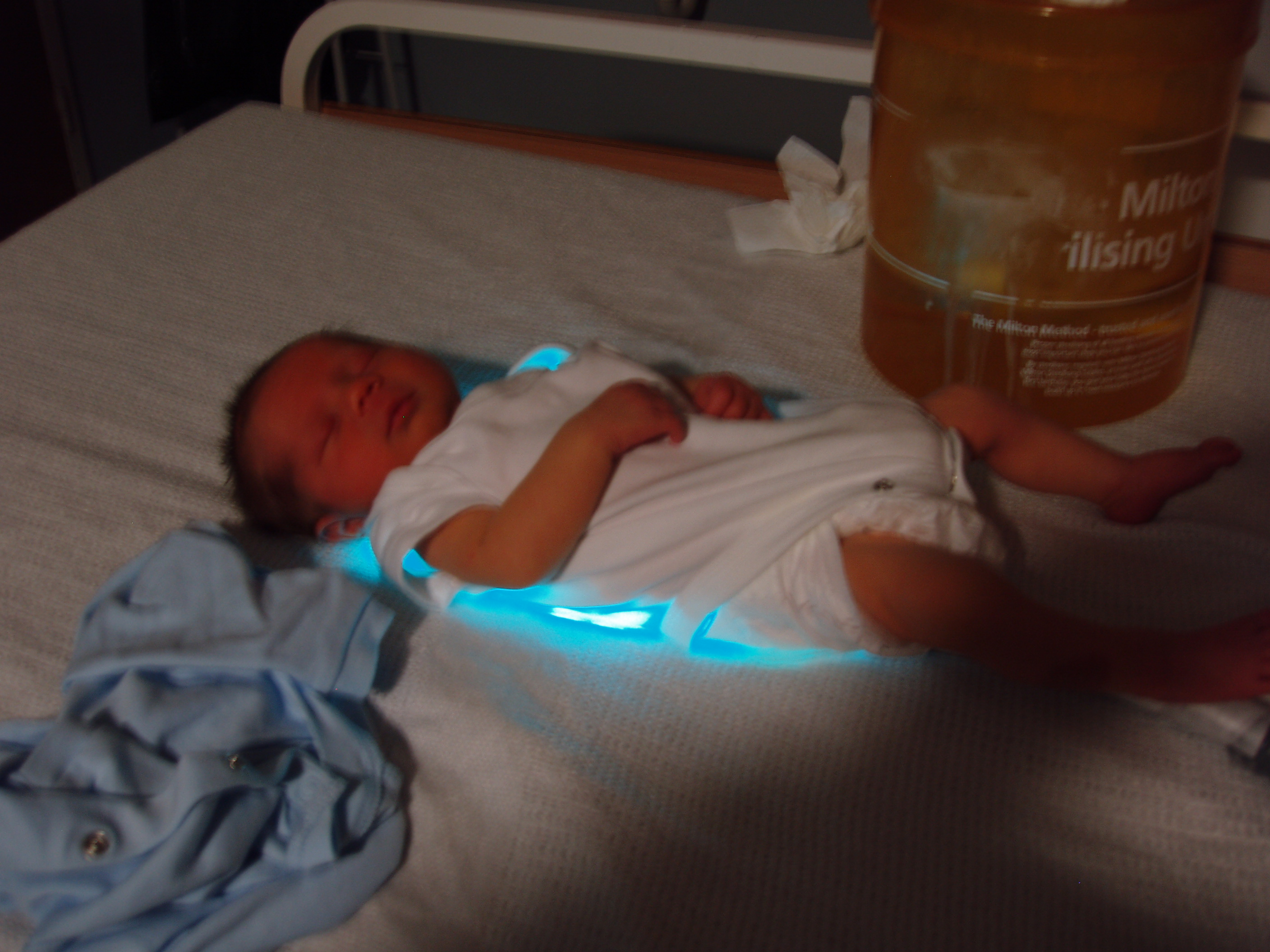
A baby being treated for jaundice with a BiliBlanket

A biliblanket is a portable phototherapy device used to treat neonatal jaundice (hyperbilirubinemia). BiliBlanket is a trademark of General Electric's Datex-Ohmeda subsidiary, but its name has become the generic, colloquial term for a range of similar products and the term used in the medical professions. The name "biliblanket" combines the words bilirubin and blanket. The baby is placed in direct contact with the pad. This device is also known as home phototherapy system, bilirubin blanket, or bidirectional fiber-optic phototherapy blanket.

Different types of phototherapy for jaundice involve a blue light of varying types of light, wavelengths, and degrees of irradiance. The light waves promote breakdown of bilirubin and allow it to be eliminated. Compared to standard forms of phototherapy, a biliblanket utilizes a fiberoptic system, allowing them to be used at home. The biliblanket system consists of three components: an illuminator, fiberoptic pad, and disposable pad cover. The fiberoptic pad is used to transport blue or white light from the light source, the illuminator, directly onto the baby's skin.

=== Proper use ===
The biliblanket setup consists of the light generator, termed the light box, the fibre-optic cable through which the light is carried, and the fiberoptic pad, which is a 25 cm x 13 cm (10" x 5") pad that is attached to the baby. The light generator stores the source of light, which is a halogen bulb. The fiber-optic cable connects the light generator to the fiberoptic pad, which contains fiberoptic fibers and usually has a disposable cover.

It is important to make sure that the light-source machine is placed on a flat, level, hard surface such as a table or nightstand to ensure proper ventilation. A disposable cover is placed onto the light pad and should be changed if the cover becomes soiled. For effective therapy, the baby's skin should be directly exposed to the light pad as much as possible. The light pad should be on at all times except during baths. The light pad is usually placed on the undressed baby's back with a diaper on. Clothing may be worn, but the clothing should be placed over the light pad, and the light pad should still be in direct contact with the baby's skin. The light pad should never be placed on the baby's head. The baby can sleep, eat, or be held while the light pad is on.

Recent studies from several countries show that the biliblanket setup can safely and effectively be used in the family's home and since 2022 home phototherapy is recommended as an option to readmission to hospital in the american national guidelines.

The biliblanket is safe and can be used for 24 hours a day as long as therapy is required. However, the duration of phototherapy will vary from individual to individual based on the baby's current condition and disease state. It will also depend on the physician's clinical judgement.

Blood tests may be required daily during phototherapy to assess the bilirubin levels and determine if normal levels have been reached and whether or not phototherapy can be stopped. Once the bilirubin levels are normal, the baby's skin will return to its normal color.

=== Advantages ===
One advantage of the biliblanket is that it can be used at home. In some cases, if the baby's condition is not too severe, the parents will be given a biliblanket to set up and use at home. This provides a more comfortable and convenient setting since the parents and baby do not have to stay in the hospital. Home treatment has proven to improve bonding and reduce stress among parents and reduce costs at the same time. Other advantages of the biliblanket are that it can be easily transported, can be used when the baby is sleeping, eating, and or being held, and promotes a relationship between parents and infants since they do not need to be separated during treatment.

=== Disadvantages ===
From a review, fibreoptic phototherapy was more effective at lowering serum bilirubin than no treatment but less effective than conventional phototherapy. However, a combination of fibreoptic and conventional phototherapy was more effective than conventional phototherapy alone.

== History ==
In 1956, Sister Jean Ward, a nurse at Rochford General Hospital in Essex, England, discovered that a jaundiced infant's body had regained its normal skin color after exposure to the sun. One small region, which had not been exposed to the sun, remained yellow in color. This discovery, along with findings that blood tubes exposed to the sun showed a decrease in bilirubin concentrations, drove research and development of the first phototherapy device for treatment of neonatal jaundice.

Phototherapy has been used to treat neonatal jaundice since the early 1970s. The conventional form of phototherapy has been performed in the hospital for more than thirty years and requires the presence of multiple overhead light sources, such as halogen or fluorescent lamps, shining directly on the baby. With advances in technology, novel forms of phototherapy emerged using optical fibers and a light source. Clinical testing for fiberoptic phototherapy devices began in 1988.
