= Amulirafusp alfa =

Monoclonal antibody
- Type: Bi-specific T-cell engager
- Source: Human
- Target: CD20, SIRPα

Identifiers
- CAS Number: 2850355-94-9
- UNII: HFR7WU5YK7

Amulirafusp alfa (IMM0306) is a cancer immunotherapy that targets CD20-positive B-cell malignancies. It is a fusion protein that combines a CD20 monoclonal antibody with the CD47 binding domain of SIRPα, allowing it to simultaneously engage both CD20 and CD47 on cancer cells. Amulirafusp alfa has a dual mechanism of action that enhances both macrophage-mediated phagocytosis and natural killer cell activation.
