= PSPA =

PSPA may refer to:

- PSPA, an alternative name for Surfactant protein A1
- PSPA (charity), a British medical charity
