= Surfactant protein A2 =

Protein-coding gene in the species Homo sapiens

SFTPA2

Identifiers
- Aliases: SFTPA2, COLEC5, PSAP, PSP-A, PSPA, SFTP1, SFTPA2B, SP-A, SPA2, SPAII, surfactant protein A2, SP-2A, ILD2
- External IDs: OMIM: 178642; MGI: 109518; GeneCards: SFTPA2

Gene location (Human)
Chr.	Chromosome 10 (human)
Band	10q22.3	Start	79,555,852 bp
Band	10q22.3	End	79,560,407 bp

Gene location (Mouse)
Chr.	Chromosome 14 (mouse)
Band	14 B|14 22.36 cM	Start	40,853,739 bp
Band	14 B|14 22.36 cM	End	40,858,409 bp
RNA expression pattern
Bgee	Human / Mouse (ortholog); Top expressed in: lower lobe of lung; visceral pleura; upper lobe of lung; right lung; upper lobe of left lung; apex of heart; bronchial epithelial cell; cerebellar hemisphere; right hemisphere of cerebellum; trachea / Top expressed in: right lung lobe; left lung; left lung lobe; trachea; alveolar duct; sexually immature organism; pulmonary alveolus; carotid body; aorta; liver; More reference expression data
BioGPS	n/a
Gene ontology
Molecular function	carbohydrate binding; lipopolysaccharide binding; monosaccharide binding
Cellular component	extracellular region; clathrin-coated endocytic vesicle; collagen; lamellar granule; endoplasmic reticulum membrane; extracellular space; multivesicular body; rough endoplasmic reticulum
Biological process	respiratory gaseous exchange by respiratory system; toll-like receptor signaling pathway; surfactant homeostasis; positive regulation of phagocytosis; developmental process
Sources:Amigo / QuickGO
Orthologs
Databases	NCBI: entry; OMA: entry
Species	Human	Mouse
Entrez	729238	20387
Ensembl	ENSG00000185303	ENSMUSG00000021789
UniProt	Q8IWL1	P35242; Q9CQI1
RefSeq (mRNA)	NM_001098668; NM_001320813; NM_001320814	NM_023134
RefSeq (protein)	NP_001092138; NP_001307742; NP_001307743	NP_075623
Location (UCSC)	Chr 10: 79.56 – 79.56 Mb	Chr 14: 40.85 – 40.86 Mb
PubMed search
- Wikidata
View/Edit Human	View/Edit Mouse

Surfactant protein A2 (SP-A2), also known as Pulmonary surfactant-associated protein A2 (PSP-A2) is a protein that in humans is encoded by the SFTPA2 gene.

== Summary ==
The protein encoded by this gene (SP-A2) is primarily synthesized in lung alveolar type II cells, as part of a complex of lipids and proteins known as pulmonary surfactant. The function of this complex is to reduce surface tension in the alveolus and prevent collapse during expiration. The protein component of surfactant helps in the modulation of the innate immune response, and inflammatory processes.

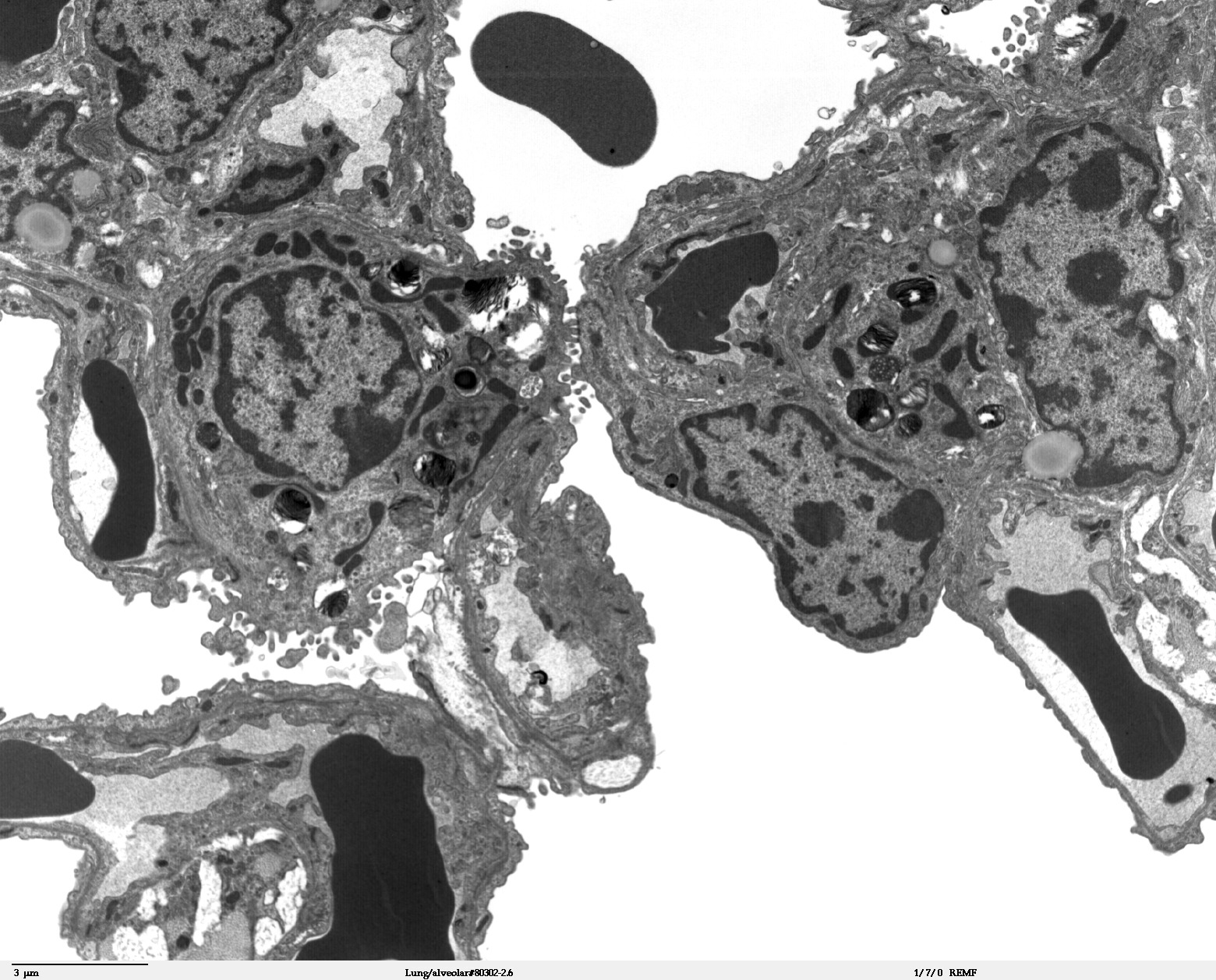
Alveolar sac region of the lung - TEM

SP-A2 is a member of a subfamily of C-type lectins called collectins. Together with (surfactant protein A1 ) SP-A1, they are the most abundant proteins of pulmonary surfactant. SP-A2 binds to the carbohydrates found in the surface of several microorganisms and helps in the defense against respiratory pathogens.

Surfactant homeostasis is critical for breathing (and thus survival) in the prematurely born infant, but also for maintaining lung health, and normal lung function throughout life. Quantitative and/or qualitative alterations in surfactant composition and/or function are associated with respiratory diseases.

== SFTPA2 expression ==
The lung is the main site of SFTPA2 synthesis, but SFTPA2 mRNA expression has also been detected in the trachea, prostate, pancreas, thymus, colon, eye, salivary gland and other tissues. While the majority of these tissues express both SFTPA2 and SFTPA1 transcripts, only SFTPA2 expression was found in the trachea and prostate. Using specific monoclonal antibodies for Surfactant protein A, the protein can be detected in lung alveolar type II pneumocytes, Club cells, and alveolar macrophages, but no extrapulmonary SP-A immunoreactivity was observed.

== Gene ==
SFTPA2 is located in the long arm of chromosome 10, close to SFTPA1. The SFTPA2 gene is 4556 base pairs in length, and 94% similar to SFTPA1. The structure of SFTPA2 consists of four coding exons (I-IV), and several 5'UTR untranslated exons (A, B, B', C, C', D, D'). The expression of SFTPA2 is regulated by cellular factors including proteins, small RNAs (microRNAs), glucocorticoids, etc. Its expression is also regulated by epigenetic and environmental factors.

Differences in the SFTPA2 gene sequence at the coding region determine SP-A genetic variants or haplotypes among individuals. More than 30 variants have been identified and characterized for SFTPA2 (and SFTPA1) in the population. SFTPA2 variants result from nucleotide changes in the codons of amino acids 9, 91, 140, and 223. Three of these do not modify the SP-A2 protein sequence (amino acids 9, 91, and 223), whereas the remaining one results in an amino acid substitution (amino acid 140). Six SP-A2 variants (1A, 1A^{0}, 1A^{1}, 1A^{2}, 1A^{3}, 1A^{5}) are in higher frequency in the general population. The most frequently found variant is 1A^{0}.

== Structure ==
SP-A2 is a protein of 248 amino acids usually found in large oligomeric structures. The mature SP-A2 monomer is a 35kDa protein that differs from SP-A1 in four amino acids at the coding region. The structure of SP-A2 monomers consists of four domains: an N-terminal, a collagen-like domain, a neck region, and a carbohydrate recognition domain. The C-terminal carbohydrate recognition domain (CRD) allows binding to various types of microorganisms and molecules. The amino acid differences that distinguish between SFTPA2 and SFTPA1 genes and between their corresponding variants are located at the collagen-like domain. The amino acid differences that distinguish among SFTPA2 variants are located both at the carbohydrate recognition and the collagen-like domains.

SP-A2 monomers group with other SP-A2 or SP-A1 monomers in trimeric structural subunits of 105kDa. Six of these structures group in 630 kDa structures that resemble flower bouquets. These oligomers contain a total of eighteen SP-A2 and/or SP-A1 monomers.

== Functions ==
- Binding of pathogens, allergens, and other molecules
- Increasing phagocytosis and chemotaxis of alveolar macrophages
- Induction of proliferation of immune cells
- Stimulation of proinflammatory cytokine production
- Modulation of the generation of reactive oxygen species
- Serving as a hormone in parturition
- Maintaining the structure of tubular myelin (an extracellular form of surfactant)

== Innate immunity ==
The role of SFTPA2 in innate immunity has been extensively studied. SP-A has the ability to bind and agglutinate bacteria, fungi, viruses, and other non-biological antigens. Some of the functions by which both SFTPA2 and SFTPA1 contribute to innate immunity include:

- opsonization of bacteria for phagocytosis by alveolar macrophages
- recruitment of monocytes and neutrophils to the site of inflammation/infection
- enhancement of pathogen-killing mechanisms: phagocytosis, release of reactive oxygen species, release of nitric oxide
- control of cytokine production by immune cells
- transition of innate immunity to adaptive immunity (by interaction with cell surface receptors of dendritic cells to allow antigen presentation)

Environmental insults such as air pollution, and exposure to high concentrations of ozone and particulate matter can affect SP-A expression and function, via mechanisms that involve epigenetic regulation of SFTPA2 expression.

== Clinical significance ==
Deficiency in SP-A levels is associated with infant respiratory distress syndrome in prematurely born infants with developmental insufficiency of surfactant production and structural immaturity in the lungs. Alterations of the relative levels of SP-A1 and SP-A2 have been found in BALF from patients with cystic fibrosis, asthma, and infection.

SFTPA2 genetic variants, SNPs, haplotypes, and other genetic variations have been associated with acute and chronic lung disease in several populations of neonates, children, and adults. SFTPA2 mutations also associated with pulmonary fibrosis via mechanisms that involve protein instability and endoplasmic reticulum stress. Methylation of SFTPA2 and SFTPA1 promoter sequences has also been found in lung cancer tissue.

== SFTPA2 mRNA transcript variants ==
Variant id	5'UTR splice	Coding	3'UTR sequence	GenBank id
ABD1A	ABD	1A	1A	HQ021432
ABD1A^{0}	ABD	1A^{0}	1A^{0}	HQ021421
ABD1A^{1}	ABD	1A^{1}	1A^{1}	HQ021422
ABD1A^{2}	ABD	1A^{2}	1A^{2}	HQ021423
ABD1A^{3}	ABD	1A^{3}	1A^{3}	HQ021424
ABD1A^{5}	ABD	1A^{5}	1A^{5}	HQ021425
ABD'1A	ABD'	1A	1A	HQ021426
ABD'1A^{0}	ABD'	1A^{0}	1A^{0}	HQ021427
ABD'1A^{1}	ABD'	1A^{1}	1A^{1}	HQ021428
ABD'1A^{2}	ABD'	1A^{2}	1A^{2}	HQ021429
ABD'1A^{3}	ABD'	1A^{3}	1A^{3}	HQ021430
ABD'1A^{5}	ABD'	1A^{5}	1A^{5}	HQ021431
SFTPA2	ABD'	1A^{2}	1A^{0}	NM_001098668.2

== Gene regulation ==
Gene expression of SFTPA2 is regulated at different levels including gene transcription, post-transcriptional processing, stability and translation (biology) of mature mRNA. One of the important features of human surfactant protein A mRNAs is that they have a variable five prime untranslated region (5'UTR) generated from splicing variation of exons A, B, C, and D. At least 10 forms of human SFTPA2 and SFTPA1 5'UTRs have been identified that differ in nucleotide sequence, length, and relative amount. Most SFTPA2 specific 5'UTRs include exon B. This 30-nucleotide long sequence has been shown to enhance both gene transcription and protein translation (biology), and plays a key role in the differential regulation of SFTPA2 and SFTPA1 expression. Both ABD and ABD' are the most represented forms among SFTPA2 transcripts (~49% each), and experimental work has shown that this sequence can stabilize mRNA, enhance translation, and activate cap-independent eukaryotic translation. Exon B of SFTPA2 also binds specific proteins (e.g. 14-3-3) that may enhance translation, in a sequence- and secondary structure- specific way. While differences at the 5'UTR are shown to regulate both transcription and translation, polymorphisms at the 3'UTR of SP-A2 variants are shown to primarily, differentially affect translation efficiency via mechanisms that involve binding of proteins and/or [microRNAs]. The impact of this regulation on SFTPA2 relative protein levels may contribute to individual differences in susceptibility to lung disease. Environmental insults and pollutants also affect SFTPA2 expression. Exposure of lung cells to particulate matter affects splicing of 5'UTR exons of SFTPA2 transcripts. Pollutants and viral infections also affect SFTPA2 translation mechanisms (see eukaryotic translation, translation (biology)).

== See also ==
- Pulmonary surfactant
- Surfactant protein A
- Collectin
