= Signal-regulatory protein alpha =

Protein-coding gene in the species Homo sapiens

SIRPA
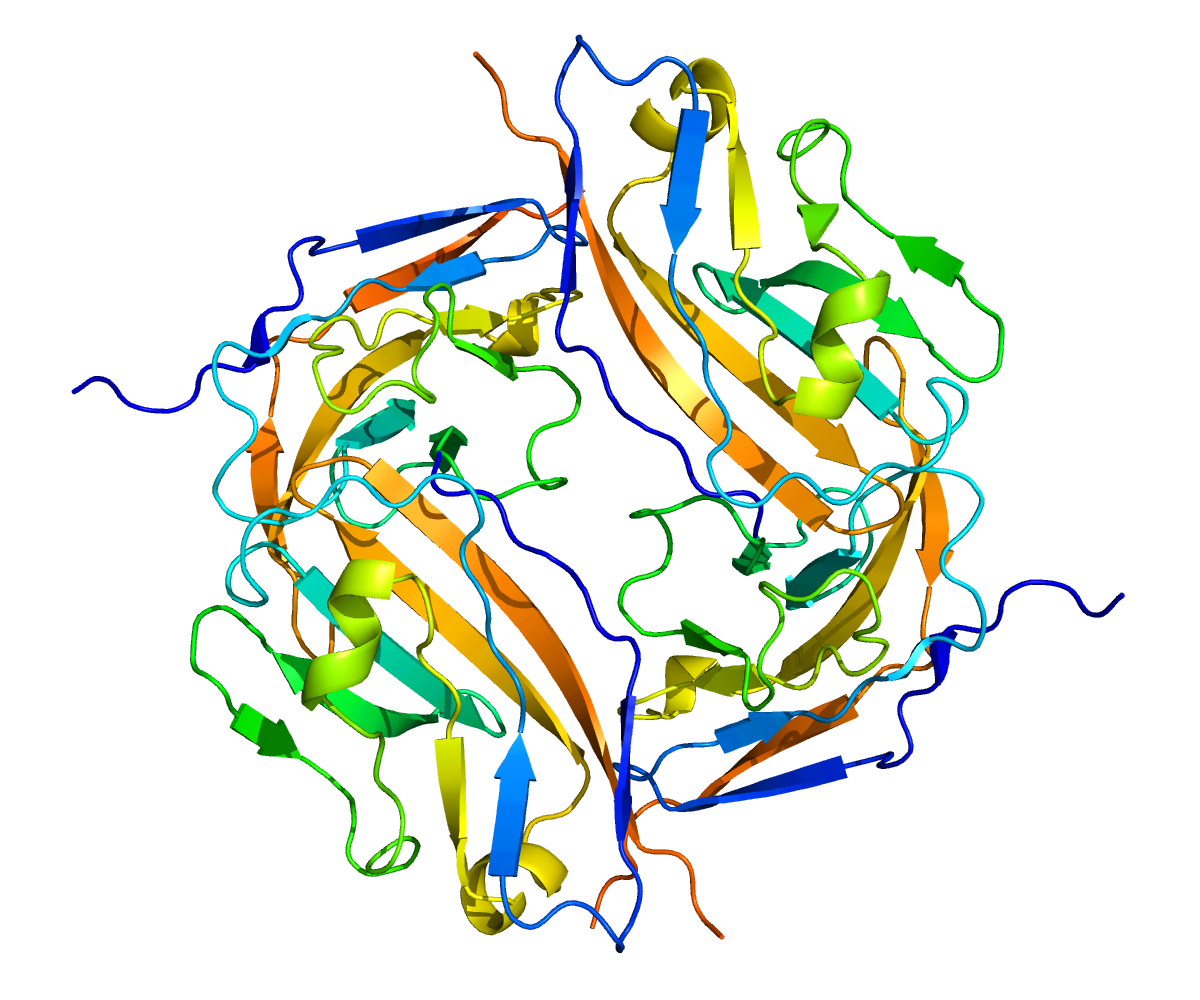

Identifiers
- Aliases: SIRPA, BIT, CD172A, MFR, MYD-1, P84, PTPNS1, SHPS1, SIRP, Signal-regulatory protein alpha, signal regulatory protein alpha
- External IDs: OMIM: 602461; MGI: 108563; GeneCards: SIRPA
Available structures
PDB	Ortholog search: PDBe RCSB
PDB	List of PDB id codes 2JJS, 2JJT, 2UV3, 2WNG, 4CMM

Gene location (Human)
Chr.	Chromosome 20 (human)
Band	20p13	Start	1,894,167 bp
Band	20p13	End	1,940,592 bp

Gene location (Mouse)
Chr.	Chromosome 2 (mouse)
Band	2 F1|2 63.19 cM	Start	129,434,755 bp
Band	2 F1|2 63.19 cM	End	129,474,148 bp
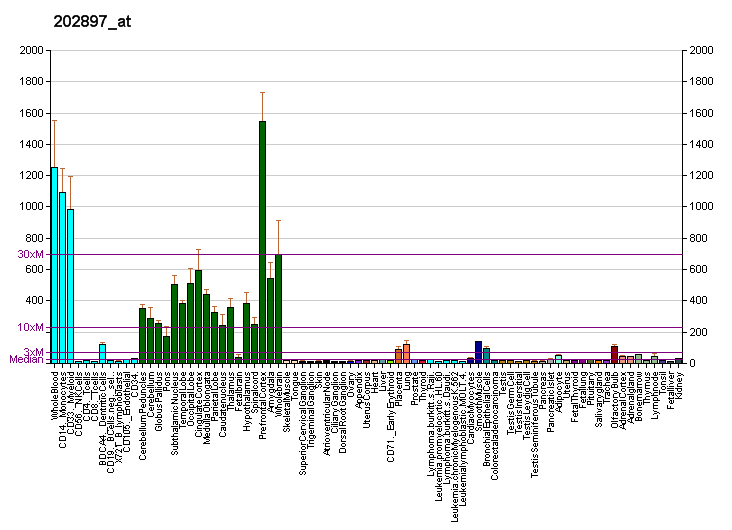

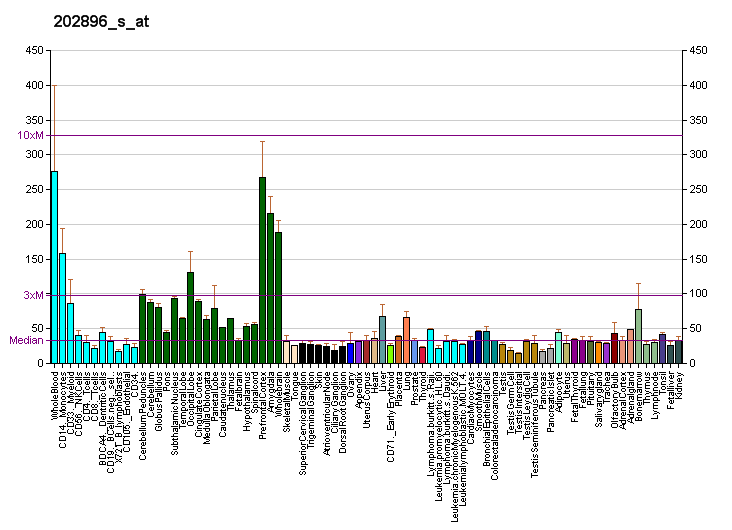

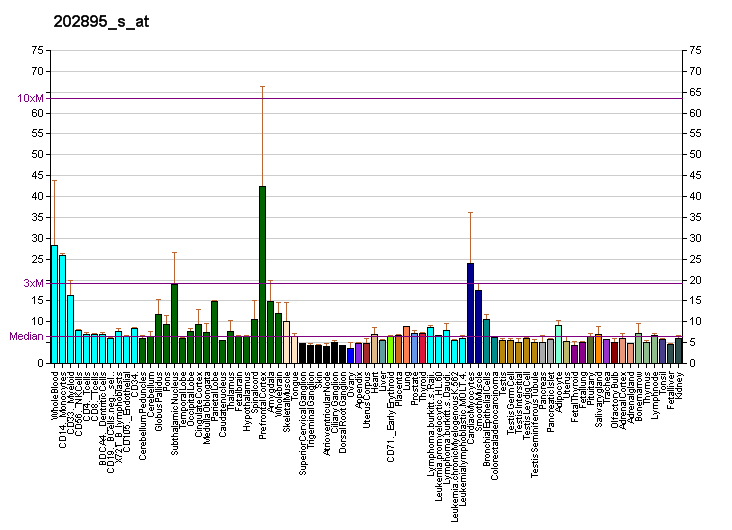
RNA expression pattern
Bgee	Human / Mouse (ortholog); Top expressed in: right frontal lobe; Brodmann area 9; right hemisphere of cerebellum; postcentral gyrus; lateral nuclear group of thalamus; prefrontal cortex; superior frontal gyrus; amygdala; middle temporal gyrus; nucleus accumbens / Top expressed in: stroma of bone marrow; granulocyte; prefrontal cortex; superior frontal gyrus; primary visual cortex; dentate gyrus of hippocampal formation granule cell; cerebellar cortex; tibiofemoral joint; perirhinal cortex; entorhinal cortex; More reference expression data
BioGPS	More reference expression data
Gene ontology
Molecular function	SH3 domain binding; protein phosphatase binding; GTPase regulator activity; protein binding involved in heterotypic cell-cell adhesion; cell-cell adhesion mediator activity; protein antigen binding; protein tyrosine kinase binding
Cellular component	integral component of membrane; plasma membrane; extracellular exosome; membrane; tertiary granule membrane; ficolin-1-rich granule membrane; integral component of plasma membrane; cell surface
Biological process	cell adhesion; leukocyte migration; neutrophil degranulation; negative regulation of protein phosphorylation; regulation of gene expression; cell migration; positive regulation of cell-cell adhesion; regulation of interferon-gamma production; regulation of interleukin-1 beta production; regulation of interleukin-6 production; regulation of tumor necrosis factor production; negative regulation of interferon-beta production; negative regulation of interleukin-6 production; negative regulation of tumor necrosis factor production; heterotypic cell-cell adhesion; monocyte extravasation; negative regulation of nitric oxide biosynthetic process; regulation of nitric oxide biosynthetic process; negative regulation of JNK cascade; negative regulation of inflammatory response; negative regulation of phagocytosis; positive regulation of phagocytosis; regulation of catalytic activity; positive regulation of T cell activation; cellular response to hydrogen peroxide; negative regulation of ERK1 and ERK2 cascade; cellular response to lipopolysaccharide; cellular response to interferon-gamma; cellular response to interleukin-1; cellular response to interleukin-12; negative regulation of macrophage inflammatory protein 1 alpha production; negative regulation of chemokine (C-C motif) ligand 5 production; cell-cell adhesion; negative regulation of cytokine production involved in inflammatory response; negative regulation of I-kappaB phosphorylation
Sources:Amigo / QuickGO
Orthologs
Databases	NCBI: entry; OMA: entry
Species	Human	Mouse
Entrez	140885	19261
Ensembl	ENSG00000198053	ENSMUSG00000037902
UniProt	P78324	P97797
RefSeq (mRNA)	NM_001040022; NM_001040023; NM_080792; NM_001330728	NM_001177646; NM_001177647; NM_001291019; NM_001291020; NM_001291021 NM_001291022; NM_007547; NM_001355158; NM_001355160
RefSeq (protein)	NP_001035111; NP_001035112; NP_001317657; NP_542970	NP_001171118; NP_001277948; NP_001277949; NP_001277950; NP_001277951 NP_031573; NP_001342087; NP_001342089
Location (UCSC)	Chr 20: 1.89 – 1.94 Mb	Chr 2: 129.43 – 129.47 Mb
PubMed search
- Wikidata
View/Edit Human	View/Edit Mouse

Signal regulatory protein α (SIRPα) is a regulatory membrane glycoprotein from SIRP family expressed mainly by myeloid cells and also by stem cells or neurons.

SIRPα acts as inhibitory receptor and interacts with a broadly expressed transmembrane protein CD47 also called the "don't eat me" signal. This interaction negatively controls effector function of innate immune cells such as host cell phagocytosis. SIRPα diffuses laterally on the macrophage membrane and accumulates at a phagocytic synapse to bind CD47 and signal 'self', which inhibits the cytoskeleton-intensive process of phagocytosis by the macrophage. This is analogous to the self signals provided by MHC class I molecules to NK cells via Ig-like or Ly49 receptors. NB. Protein shown to the right is CD47 not SIRP α.

== Structure ==
The cytoplasmic region of SIRPα is highly conserved between rats, mice and humans. Cytoplasmic region contains a number of tyrosine residues, which likely act as ITIMs. Upon CD47 ligation, SIRPα is phosphorylated and recruits phosphatases like SHP1 and SHP2. The extracellular region contains three Immunoglobulin superfamily domains – single V-set and two C1-set IgSF domains. SIRP β and γ have the similar extracellular structure but different cytoplasmic regions giving contrasting types of signals. SIRP α polymorphisms are found in ligand-binding IgSF V-set domain but it does not affect ligand binding. One idea is that the polymorphism is important to protect the receptor of pathogens binding.

== Ligands ==
SIRPα recognizes CD47, an anti-phagocytic signal that distinguishes live cells from dying cells. CD47 has a single Ig-like extracellular domain and five membrane spanning regions. The interaction between SIRPα and CD47 can be modified by endocytosis or cleavage of the receptor, or interaction with surfactant proteins. Surfactant protein A and D are soluble ligands, highly expressed in the lungs, that bind to the same region of SIRPα as CD47 and can therefore competitively block binding.

== Signalling ==
The extracellular domain of SIRP α binds to CD47 and transmits intracellular signals through its cytoplasmic domain. CD47-binding is mediated through the NH2-terminal V-like domain of SIRP α. The cytoplasmic region contains four ITIMs that become phosphorylated after binding of ligand. The phosphorylation mediates activation of tyrosine kinase SHP2. SIRP α has been shown to bind also phosphatase SHP1, adaptor protein SCAP2 and FYN-binding protein. Recruitment of SHP phosphatases to the membrane leads to the inhibition of myosin accumulation at the cell surface and results in the inhibition of phagocytosis.

== Cancer ==
Cancer cells highly expressed CD47 that activate SIRP α and inhibit macrophage-mediated destruction. In one study, they engineered high-affinity variants of SIRP α that antagonized CD47 on cancer cells and caused increase phagocytosis of cancer cells. Another study (in mice) found anti-SIRPα antibodies helped macrophages to reduce cancer growth and metastasis, alone and in synergy with other cancer treatments.
