= SP-A =

SP-A may refer to:

- Socialistische Partij Anders, the previous name of Belgian political party Vooruit
- Surfactant protein A
- South Pole–Aitken basin, the largest confirmed impact basin on the Moon
