= Collectin-12 =

Protein found in humans

COLEC12

Identifiers
- Aliases: COLEC12, CLP1, NSR2, SCARA4, SRCL, collectin subfamily member 12
- External IDs: OMIM: 607621; MGI: 2152907; GeneCards: COLEC12
Available structures
PDB	Ortholog search: PDBe RCSB
PDB	List of PDB id codes 2OX8

Gene location (Human)
Chr.	Chromosome 18 (human)
Band	18p11.32	Start	316,737 bp
Band	18p11.32	End	500,722 bp

Gene location (Mouse)
Chr.	Chromosome 18 (mouse)
Band	18|18 A1	Start	9,707,595 bp
Band	18|18 A1	End	9,882,644 bp
RNA expression pattern
Bgee	Human / Mouse (ortholog); Top expressed in: synovial joint; tibia; synovial membrane; tendon of biceps brachii; retinal pigment epithelium; placenta; skin of hip; periodontal fiber; pericardium; cartilage tissue / Top expressed in: basilar part of occipital bone; mesothelium of peritoneum; sphenoid bone; calvaria; basisphenoid; pericardium; vestibular sensory epithelium; external carotid artery; rib; pleura; More reference expression data
BioGPS	n/a
Gene ontology
Molecular function	pattern recognition receptor activity; galactose binding; metal ion binding; low-density lipoprotein particle binding; scavenger receptor activity; carbohydrate binding
Cellular component	integral component of membrane; endocytic vesicle membrane; collagen; membrane; plasma membrane; extracellular space; extracellular matrix
Biological process	defense response; positive regulation of cell adhesion molecule production; carbohydrate mediated signaling; receptor-mediated endocytosis; immune response; cellular response to exogenous dsRNA; phagocytosis, recognition; innate immune response; toll-like receptor 3 signaling pathway; protein homooligomerization; regulation of immune response
Sources:Amigo / QuickGO
Orthologs
Databases	NCBI: entry; OMA: entry
Species	Human	Mouse
Entrez	81035	140792
Ensembl	ENSG00000158270	ENSMUSG00000036103
UniProt	Q5KU26	Q8K4Q8
RefSeq (mRNA)	NM_030781; NM_130386	NM_130449
RefSeq (protein)	NP_569057	NP_569716
Location (UCSC)	Chr 18: 0.32 – 0.5 Mb	Chr 18: 9.71 – 9.88 Mb
PubMed search
- Wikidata
View/Edit Human	View/Edit Mouse

Collectin-12, also known as collectin subfamily member 12, is a collectin protein that in humans is encoded by the COLEC12 gene.

== Function ==
This gene encodes a member of the collectin family, proteins that possess collagen-like sequences and carbohydrate recognition domains. This protein is a scavenger receptor that displays several functions associated with host defense. It can bind to carbohydrate antigens on microorganisms, facilitating their recognition and removal. It also mediates the recognition, internalization, and degradation of oxidatively modified low density lipoprotein by vascular endothelial cells. [provided by RefSeq, May 2018].
