= Surfactant protein A1 =

Protein-coding gene in the species Homo sapiens

SFTPA1

Identifiers
- Aliases: SFTPA1, COLEC4, PSAP, PSP-A, PSPA, SFTP1, SFTPA1B, SP-A, SP-A1, SPA, SPA1, surfactant protein A1, SP-A1 beta, SP-A1 delta, SP-A1 gamma, SP-A1 epsilon, ILD1
- External IDs: OMIM: 178630; MGI: 109518; GeneCards: SFTPA1

Gene location (Human)
| Chr. | Chromosome 10 (human) |
| Band | 10q22.3 | Start | 79,610,939 bp |
| Band | 10q22.3 | End | 79,615,455 bp |

Gene location (Mouse)
| Chr. | Chromosome 14 (mouse) |
| Band | 14 B|14 22.36 cM | Start | 40,853,739 bp |
| Band | 14 B|14 22.36 cM | End | 40,858,409 bp |
RNA expression pattern
| Bgee | Human / Mouse (ortholog); Top expressed in: right lung; upper lobe of left lung; apex of heart; gonad; islet of Langerhans; gastrocnemius muscle; left ventricle; right lobe of thyroid gland; appendix; sural nerve / Top expressed in: right lung lobe; left lung; left lung lobe; trachea; alveolar duct; sexually immature organism; pulmonary alveolus; carotid body; aorta; liver; More reference expression data |
| BioGPS | n/a |
Gene ontology
| Molecular function | protein binding; carbohydrate binding; lipid transporter activity; lipopolysaccharide binding; monosaccharide binding |
| Cellular component | extracellular region; clathrin-coated endocytic vesicle; collagen; lamellar granule; endoplasmic reticulum membrane; extracellular space; multivesicular body; rough endoplasmic reticulum |
| Biological process | respiratory gaseous exchange by respiratory system; lipid transport; toll-like receptor signaling pathway; opsonization; surfactant homeostasis; positive regulation of phagocytosis; developmental process |
Sources:Amigo / QuickGO
Orthologs
| Databases | NCBI: entry; OMA: entry |
| Species | Human | Mouse |
| Entrez | 653509 | 20387 |
| Ensembl | ENSG00000122852 | ENSMUSG00000021789 |
| UniProt | Q8IWL2 | P35242; Q9CQI1 |
| RefSeq (mRNA) | NM_001093770; NM_001164644; NM_001164645; NM_001164646; NM_001164647 NM_005411 | NM_023134 |
| RefSeq (protein) | NP_001087239; NP_001158116; NP_001158117; NP_001158118; NP_001158119 NP_005402 | NP_075623 |
| Location (UCSC) | Chr 10: 79.61 – 79.62 Mb | Chr 14: 40.85 – 40.86 Mb |
| PubMed search |
- Wikidata
| View/Edit Human | View/Edit Mouse |

Surfactant protein A1 (SP-A1), also known as Pulmonary surfactant-associated protein A1 (PSP-A) is a protein that in humans is encoded by the SFTPA1 gene.

SP-A1 is primarily synthesised in type II alveolar cells in the lung, as part of a complex of lipids and proteins known as pulmonary surfactant. The function of this complex is to reduce surface tension in the alveoli and prevent their collapse during expiration. The protein component of surfactant helps in the modulation of the innate immune response, and inflammatory processes.

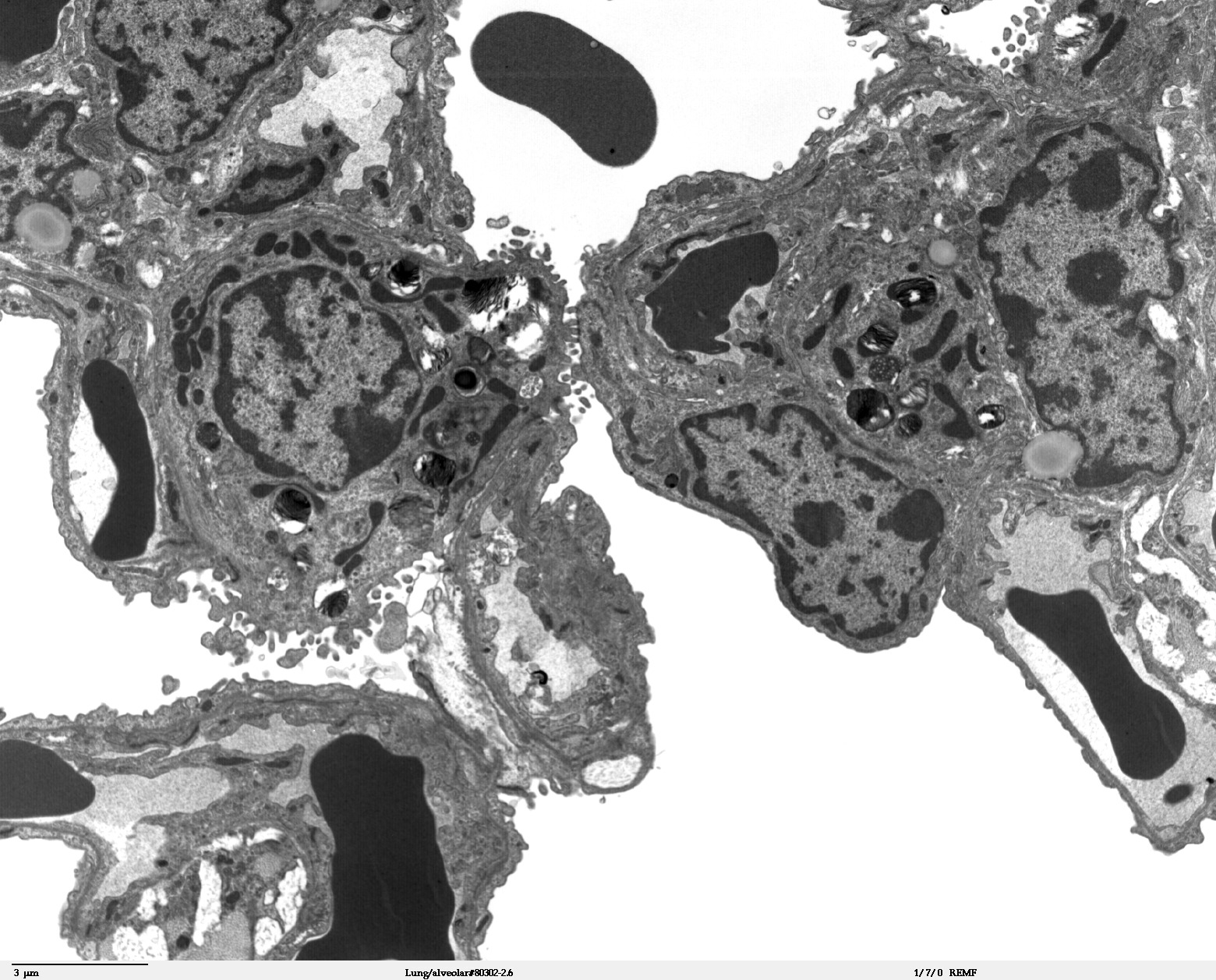
Alveolar sac region of the lung - TEM

SP-A1 is a member of a subfamily of C-type lectins called collectins. Together with SP-A2, they are the most abundant proteins of pulmonary surfactant. SP-A1 binds to the carbohydrates found in the surface of several microorganisms and helps in the defense against respiratory pathogens.

Surfactant homeostasis is critical for breathing (and thus survival) in the prematurely born infant, but also for maintaining lung health, and normal lung function throughout life. Changes in the amount or composition of surfactant can alter its function and are associated with respiratory diseases.

== Gene ==
SFTPA1 is located in the long arm q of chromosome 10, close to SFTPA2. The SFTPA1 gene is 4505 base pairs in length, and 94% similar to SFTPA2. The structure of SFTPA1 consists of four coding exons (I-IV), and several 5'UTR untranslated exons (A, B, B', C, C', D, D'). The expression of SFTPA1 is regulated by cellular factors including proteins, small RNAs (microRNAs), glucocorticoids, etc. Its expression is also regulated by epigenetic and environmental factors.

Differences in the SFTPA1 gene sequence at the coding region determine SP-A genetic variants or haplotypes among individuals. More than 30 variants have been identified and characterized for SFTPA1 (and SFTPA2) in the population. SFTPA1 variants result from nucleotide changes in the codons of amino acids 19, 50, 62, 133, and 219. Two of these do not modify the SP-A1 protein sequence (amino acids 62 and 133), whereas the rest result in amino acid substitutions (amino acid 19, 50, 133, and 219). Four SP-A1 variants (6A, 6A^{2}, 6A^{3}, 6A^{4}) are in higher frequency in the general population. The most frequently found variant is 6A^{2}.

=== Alternative splicing ===
| Variant id | 5'UTR splice | Coding | 3'UTR sequence | GenBank id |
|---|---|---|---|---|
| AD'6A | AD' | 6A | 6A | HQ021433 |
| AD'6A^{2} | AD' | 6A^{2} | 6A^{2} | HQ021434 |
| AD'6A^{3} | AD' | 6A^{3} | 6A^{3} | HQ021435 |
| AD'6A^{4} | AD' | 6A^{4} | 6A^{4} | HQ021436 |
| AB'D'6A | AB'D' | 6A | 6A | JX502764 |
| AB'D'6A^{2} | AB'D' | 6A^{2} | 6A^{2} | HQ021437 |
| AB'D'6A^{3} | AB'D' | 6A^{3} | 6A^{3} | HQ021438 |
| AB'D'6A^{4} | AB'D' | 6A^{4} | 6A^{4} | HQ021439 |
| ACD'6A | ACD' | 6A | 6A | JX502765 |
| ACD'6A^{2} | ACD' | 6A^{2} | 6A^{2} | HQ021440 |
| ACD'6A^{3} | ACD' | 6A^{3} | 6A^{3} | HQ021441 |
| ACD'6A^{4} | ACD' | 6A^{4} | 6A^{4} | HQ021442 |
| SFTPA1 variant 1 | AB'D' | 6A^{3} | 6A^{3} | NM_005411.4 |
| SFTPA1 variant 2 | ACD' | 6A^{3} | 6A^{3} | NM_001093770.2 |
| SFTPA1 variant 3 | ABD' | 6A^{3} | 6A^{3} | NM_001164644.1 |
| SFTPA1 variant 4 | AD' | 6A^{3} | 6A^{3} | NM_001164647.1 |
| SFTPA1 variant 5 | ACD' | 6A^{3} (truncated) | 6A^{3} | NM_001164645.1 |
| SFTPA1 variant 6 | AB'D' | 6A^{3} (truncated) | 6A^{3} | NM_001164646.1 |

=== Regulation ===
Gene expression of SFTPA1 is regulated at different levels including gene transcription, post-transcriptional processing, stability and translation of mature mRNA. One of the important features of human surfactant protein A mRNAs is that they have a variable five prime untranslated region (5'UTR) generated from splicing variation of exons A, B, C, and D. At least 10 forms of human SFTPA1 and SFTPA2 5'UTRs have been identified that differ in nucleotide sequence, length, and relative amount. Specific SFTPA1 or SFTPA2 5'UTRs have also been characterized. Some SFTPA1 specific 5'UTRs include exons B' or C. These two exons contain upstream AUGs (uAUGs) that can potentially act as sites for translation initiation (see eukaryotic translation), affecting protein translation and SFTPA1 relative content. The majority of SFTPA1 transcripts lack exon B, a sequence implicated in transcription and translation enhancement, indicating a differential regulation of SFTPA1 and SFTPA2 expression. The AD' form is the most represented among SFTPA1 transcripts (81%), and experimental work has shown that this sequence can stabilize mRNA and enhance translation, but the mechanisms implicated in this regulation are still under investigation. While differences at the 5'UTR are shown to regulate both transcription and translation, polymorphisms at the 3'UTR of SP-A1 variants are shown to primarily, differentially affect translation efficiency via mechanisms that involve binding of proteins and/or [microRNAs]. The impact of this regulation on SFTPA1 and SFTPA2 protein levels may contribute to individual differences in susceptibility to lung disease. Environmental insults and pollutants also affect SFTPA1 expression. Exposure of lung cells to particulate matter affects splicing of 5'UTR exons of SFTPA1 transcripts. Pollutants and viral infections also affect SFTPA1 translation mechanisms (see eukaryotic translation, translation (biology)).

== Tissue distribution ==
The lung is the main site of SFTPA1 synthesis, but SFTPA1 mRNA expression has also been detected in the trachea, prostate, pancreas, thymus, colon, eye, salivary gland and other tissues. Using specific monoclonal antibodies for Surfactant protein A, the protein can be detected in lung alveolar type II pneumocytes, club cells, and alveolar macrophages, but no extrapulmonary SP-A immunoreactivity was observed.

== Structure ==
Surfactant protein A (SP-A) is a protein of 248 amino acids usually found in large oligomeric structures. The mature SP-A1 monomer is a 35kDa protein that differs from SP-A2 in four amino acids at the coding region. The structure of SP-A1 monomers consists of four domains: an N-terminal, a collagen-like domain, a neck region, and a carbohydrate recognition domain. The C-terminal carbohydrate recognition domain (CRD) allows binding to various types of microorganisms and molecules. The amino acid differences that distinguish between SP-A1 and SP-A2 genes and between their corresponding variants are located at the collagen-like domain. The amino acid differences that distinguish among SFTPA1 variants are located both at the carbohydrate recognition and the collagen-like domains.

SP-A1 monomers group with other SP-A1 or SP-A2 monomers in trimeric structural subunits of 105kDa. Six of these structures group in 630 kDa structures that resemble flower bouquets. These oligomers contain a total of eighteen SP-A1 and/or SP-A2 monomers.

== Function ==
- Binding of pathogens, allergens, and other molecules
- Increasing phagocytosis and chemotaxis of alveolar macrophages
- Induction of proliferation of immune cells
- Stimulation of proinflammatory cytokine production
- Modulation of the generation of reactive oxygen species
- Serving as a hormone in parturition
- Maintaining the structure of tubular myelin (an extracellular form of surfactant)

=== Innate immunity ===
The role of SFTPA1 in innate immunity has been extensively studied. SP-A has the ability to bind and agglutinate bacteria, fungi, viruses, and other non-biological antigens. Some of the functions by which both SFTPA1 and SFTPA2 contribute to innate immunity include:

- opsonization of bacteria for phagocytosis by alveolar macrophages
- recruitment of monocytes and neutrophils to the site of inflammation/infection
- enhancement of pathogen-killing mechanisms: phagocytosis, release of reactive oxygen species, release of nitric oxide
- control of cytokine production by immune cells
- transition of innate immunity to adaptive immunity (by interaction with cell surface receptors of dendritic cells to allow antigen presentation)

Environmental insults such as air pollution, and exposure to high concentrations of ozone and particulate matter can affect SP-A expression and function, via mechanisms that involve epigenetic regulation of SFTPA1 expression.

== Clinical significance ==
Deficiency in SP-A levels is associated with infant respiratory distress syndrome in prematurely born infants with developmental insufficiency of surfactant production and structural immaturity in the lungs.

SFTPA1 genetic variants, SNPs, haplotypes, and other genetic variations have been associated with acute and chronic lung disease in several populations of neonates, children, and adults. Genetic variations in SFTPA1 have been associated with susceptibility to idiopathic pulmonary fibrosis, a lung disease characterized by shortness of breath, pulmonary infiltrates and inflammation that results in acute lung damage with subsequent scarring of lung tissue. Genetic variations in SFTPA1 are also a cause of susceptibility to respiratory distress syndrome in premature infants, a lung disease characterized by deficient gas exchange, diffuse atelectasis, high-permeability lung edema and fibrin-rich alveolar deposits "surfactant protein A1".. The ratio of SP-A1 to total SP-A has been correlated with lung disease (e.g. asthma, cystic fibrosis) and aging. Methylation of SFTPA1 promoter sequences has also been found in lung cancer tissue.
