= Collectin-10 =

Mammalian protein found in humans

COLEC10

Identifiers
- Aliases: COLEC10, CLL1, CL-34, collectin subfamily member 10, 3MC3, CL-10
- External IDs: OMIM: 607620; MGI: 3606482; GeneCards: COLEC10

Gene location (Human)
| Chr. | Chromosome 8 (human) |
| Band | 8q24.12 | Start | 118,995,452 bp |
| Band | 8q24.12 | End | 119,108,455 bp |

Gene location (Mouse)
| Chr. | Chromosome 15 (mouse) |
| Band | 15 D1|15 21.15 cM | Start | 54,274,170 bp |
| Band | 15 D1|15 21.15 cM | End | 54,329,754 bp |
RNA expression pattern
| Bgee | Human / Mouse (ortholog); Top expressed in: right lobe of liver; testicle; stromal cell of endometrium; gonad; right lung; gallbladder; left ventricle; islet of Langerhans; apex of heart; right coronary artery / Top expressed in: migratory enteric neural crest cell; liver; left lobe of liver; yolk sac; small intestine; ileum; duodenum; abdominal wall; jejunum; Paneth cell; More reference expression data |
| BioGPS | n/a |
Gene ontology
| Molecular function | mannose binding; carbohydrate binding; serine-type endopeptidase activity; chemoattractant activity; monosaccharide binding |
| Cellular component | collagen; extracellular region; extracellular space; cytoplasm; Golgi apparatus |
| Biological process | complement activation; proteolysis; complement activation, lectin pathway; positive chemotaxis; cranial skeletal system development; developmental process |
Sources:Amigo / QuickGO
Orthologs
| Databases | NCBI: entry; OMA: entry |
| Species | Human | Mouse |
| Entrez | 10584 | 239447 |
| Ensembl | ENSG00000184374 | ENSMUSG00000038591 |
| UniProt | Q9Y6Z7 | Q8CF98 |
| RefSeq (mRNA) | NM_006438; NM_001324095 | NM_173422 |
| RefSeq (protein) | NP_001311024; NP_006429 | NP_775598 |
| Location (UCSC) | Chr 8: 119 – 119.11 Mb | Chr 15: 54.27 – 54.33 Mb |
| PubMed search |
- Wikidata
| View/Edit Human | View/Edit Mouse |

Collectin-10, also known as collectin liver 1, is a collectin protein that in humans is encoded by the COLEC10 gene. Its structure is similar to mannan-binding lectin (MBL).

Collectin liver 1 (CL-L1) show very similar carbohydrate selectivity as MBL. Two other discovered collectins include collectin placenta 1 (CL-P1) and collectin kidney 1 (CL-K1). CL-L1's location found to be on chromosome 8 q23-24.1. Research concluded CL-L1 to be a serum protein.
