= Pulmonary surfactant protein D =

Surfac_D-trimer
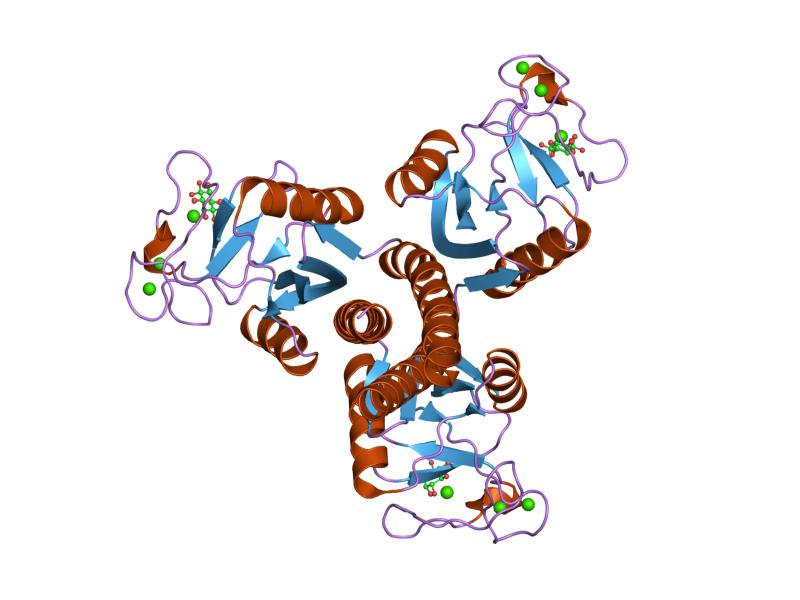
- Crystal structure of the trimeric neck and carbohydrate recognition domain of human surfactant protein D in complex with myoinositol

Identifiers
- Symbol: Surfac_D-trimer
- Pfam: PF09006
- InterPro: IPR015097
Available protein structures:
- PDB: IPR015097 PF09006 (ECOD; PDBsum)
- AlphaFold: IPR015097; PF09006

In molecular biology, Pulmonary surfactant protein D (SP-D) is a protein domain predominantly found in lung surfactant. This protein plays a special role; its primary task is to act as a defence protein against any pathogens that may invade the lung. It also plays a role in lubricating the lung and preventing it from collapse. It has an interesting structure as it forms a triple-helical parallel coiled coil, helps the protein to fold into a trimer.

== Function ==
Pulmonary surfactant protein D (SP-D), has an important role in acting as a lung host defence protein. SP-D has a significant roles in immune and inflammatory regulation of the lung as it regulates of the level of surfactant in the lungs by a process named surfactant homeostasis.

== Structure ==
SP-D is a type of lectin, more specifically they are a collagen-containing C-type (calcium dependent) lectin which are named collectins. The collectins are responsible for immune and inflammatory control. They have a very basic structure,

- triple-helical collagen region
- C-terminal homotrimeric lectin or carbohydrate recognition domain (CRD).

SP-D is actually a monomer, these monomers assist in high affinity saccharide binding. Three of the same type of monomers associate to form a homotrimer.

SP-D has a complex quaternary structure in which monomers (43 kDa) are assembled into tetramers of trimers thus forming dodecamers. Dodecamers are further assembled into large multimeric structures. The oligomerization of SP-D results in the burial of the tail domains while the head domains are exposed. Oligomerization is dependent upon the cysteine residues at positions 15 and 20 within the N-terminal tail region.
