= Conglutinin =

Collectin protein

collectin sub-family member 8 (conglutinin)

Identifiers
- Symbol: COLEC8
- NCBI gene: 50638
- HGNC: 2222

conglutinin 1

Identifiers
- Symbol: CGN1
- NCBI gene: 1099
- HGNC: 1904

Conglutinin is a collectin protein.
