= DMBT1 =

Protein-coding gene in the species Homo sapiens

Identifiers
- Aliases: DMBT1, GP340, muclin, SAG, deleted in malignant brain tumors 1, SALSA
- External IDs: OMIM: 601969; MGI: 106210; GeneCards: DMBT1

Gene location (Human)
Chr.	Chromosome 10 (human)
Band	10q26.13	Start	122,560,665 bp
Band	10q26.13	End	122,643,736 bp

Gene location (Mouse)
Chr.	Chromosome 7 (mouse)
Band	7|7 F3	Start	130,633,776 bp
Band	7|7 F3	End	130,723,357 bp
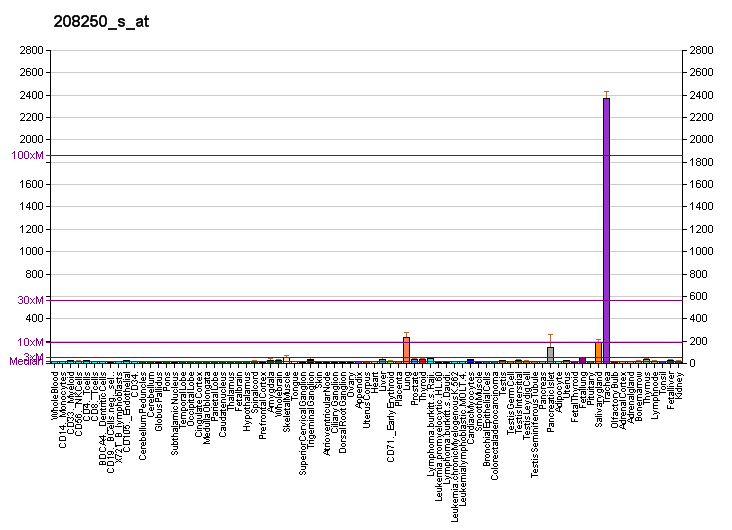
RNA expression pattern
Bgee	Human / Mouse (ortholog); Top expressed in: parotid gland; trachea; jejunal mucosa; olfactory zone of nasal mucosa; duodenum; mucosa of ileum; palpebral conjunctiva; mucosa of transverse colon; pancreatic ductal cell; gallbladder / Top expressed in: gallbladder; lacrimal gland; pyloric antrum; large intestine; colon; duodenum; left colon; crypt of lieberkuhn of small intestine; Paneth cell; jejunum; More reference expression data
BioGPS	More reference expression data
Gene ontology
Molecular function	pattern recognition receptor activity; calcium-dependent protein binding; protein binding; zymogen binding; lipopolysaccharide binding; DNA binding; scavenger receptor activity; lipoteichoic acid binding; heparan sulfate binding
Cellular component	cytoplasm; phagocytic vesicle membrane; membrane; zymogen granule membrane; extracellular region; extracellular exosome; extrinsic component of membrane; extracellular space; external side of plasma membrane; extracellular matrix
Biological process	cell differentiation; epithelial cell differentiation; multicellular organism development; defense response to virus; protein transport; innate immune response; viral process; pattern recognition receptor signaling pathway; receptor-mediated endocytosis; transport; induction of bacterial agglutination; defense response to Gram-negative bacterium; defense response to Gram-positive bacterium; antimicrobial humoral immune response mediated by antimicrobial peptide; vesicle-mediated transport; endocytosis
Sources:Amigo / QuickGO
Orthologs
Databases	NCBI: entry; OMA: entry
Species	Human	Mouse
Entrez	1755	12945
Ensembl	ENSG00000187908	ENSMUSG00000047517
UniProt	Q9UGM3	Q60997
RefSeq (mRNA)	NM_004406; NM_007329; NM_017579; NM_001320644; NM_001377530	NM_007769; NM_001347632
RefSeq (protein)	NP_001307573; NP_004397; NP_015568; NP_060049	NP_001334561; NP_031795
Location (UCSC)	Chr 10: 122.56 – 122.64 Mb	Chr 7: 130.63 – 130.72 Mb
PubMed search
- Wikidata
View/Edit Human	View/Edit Mouse

Deleted in malignant brain tumors 1 protein is a protein that in humans is encoded by the DMBT1 gene.

== Function ==
Loss of sequences from human chromosome 10q has been associated with the progression of human cancers. The gene DMBT1 was originally isolated based on its deletion in a medulloblastoma cell line. DMBT1 is expressed with transcripts of 6.0, 7.5, and 8.0 kb in fetal lung and with one transcript of 8.0 kb in adult lung, although the 7.5 kb transcript has not been characterized. The DMBT1 protein is a glycoprotein containing multiple scavenger receptor cysteine-rich (SRCR) domains separated by SRCR-interspersed domains (SID). Transcript variant 2 (8.0 kb) has been shown to bind surfactant protein D independently of carbohydrate recognition. This indicates that DMBT1 may not be a classical tumor suppressor gene, but rather play a role in the interaction of tumor cells and the immune system.

== Pattern recognition and potential use of DMBT1 in nanomedicine ==
At epithelial barriers molecular pattern recognition mechanisms act as minesweepers against harmful environmental factors and thereby play a crucial role in the defense against invading bacterial and viral pathogens. However, it became evident that some of the proteins participating in these host defense processes may simultaneously function as regulators of tissue regeneration when in the extracellular matrix, thus coupling defense functions with regulation of stem cells. Although molecular pattern recognition has complex physiological roles and we just begin to understand its various functions, the simplicity of the underlying principles for recognition of specific classes of molecules may generate novel starting points for nanomedical approaches in drug delivery across epithelial barriers. The protein DMBT1, showed pattern recognition activity for poly-sulfated and poly-phosphorylated ligands, including nucleic acids, and the ability to aggregate ligands. This raises the interesting question in how far these properties can be utilized to assemble nucleic acidpeptide nano-complexes and whether this can be exploited to modulate the pharmacological properties of nucleic acids and/or for nucleic acid delivery to target cells Recently, DMBT1-derived peptides have been successfully harnessed for siRNA intracellular delivery.

== Interactions ==
DMBT1 has been shown to interact with Surfactant protein D. DMBT1-derived peptides also interacts with nucleic acids.
