= Thrombospondin 1 =

Protein-coding gene in the species Homo sapiens

THBS1
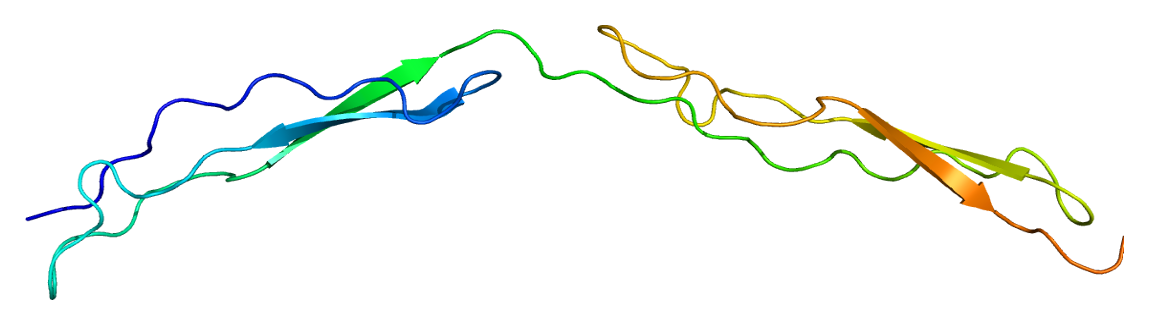
Available structures
| PDB | Ortholog search: PDBe RCSB |
| PDB | List of PDB id codes 1LSL, 1UX6, 1Z78, 1ZA4, 2ERF, 2ES3, 2OUH, 2OUJ, 3R6B, 5FOE |

Identifiers
- Aliases: THBS1, THBS, THBS-1, TSP, TSP-1, TSP1, thrombospondin 1
- External IDs: OMIM: 188060; MGI: 98737; HomoloGene: 31142; GeneCards: THBS1; OMA:THBS1 - orthologs

Gene location (Human)
| Chr. | Chromosome 15 (human) |
| Band | 15q14 | Start | 39,581,079 bp |
| Band | 15q14 | End | 39,599,466 bp |

Gene location (Mouse)
| Chr. | Chromosome 2 (mouse) |
| Band | 2 E5|2 59.34 cM | Start | 117,942,357 bp |
| Band | 2 E5|2 59.34 cM | End | 117,957,614 bp |
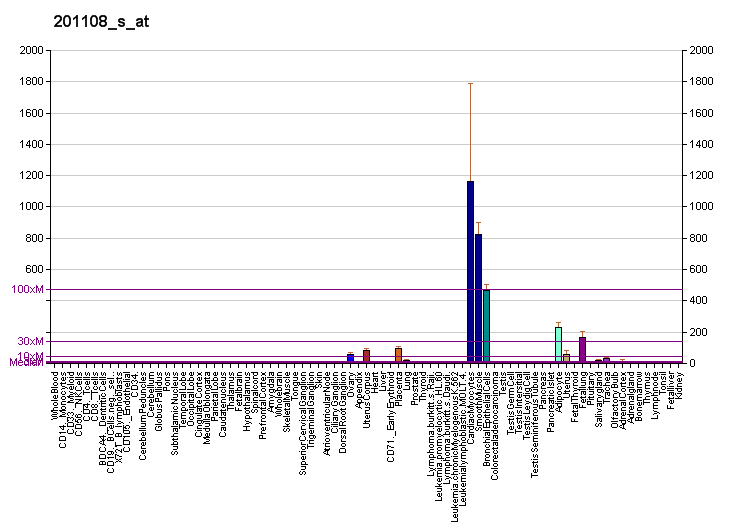

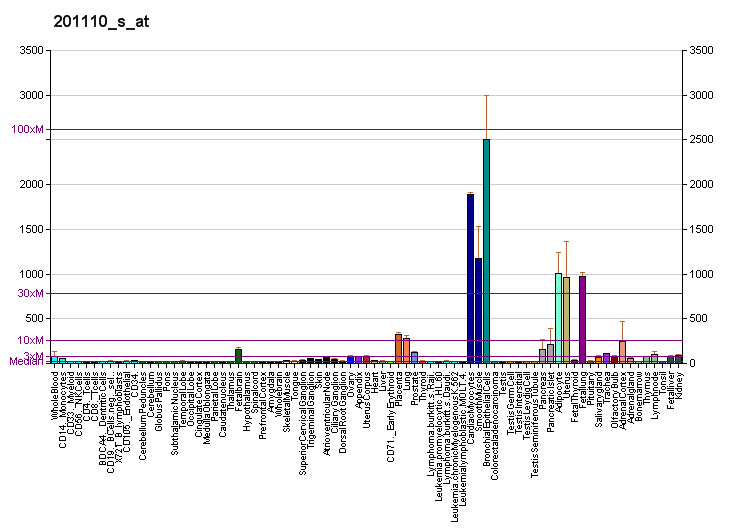

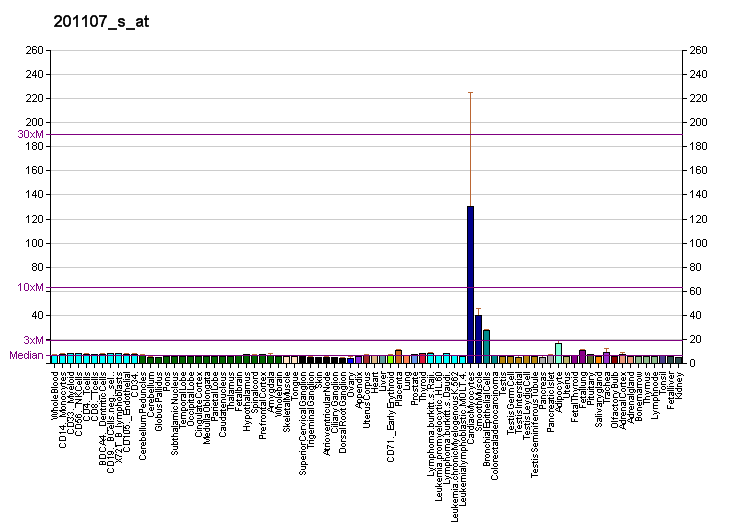
RNA expression pattern
| Bgee | Human / Mouse (ortholog); Top expressed in: stromal cell of endometrium; gastric mucosa; pericardium; gallbladder; left uterine tube; Achilles tendon; right lung; smooth muscle tissue; upper lobe of left lung; vena cava / Top expressed in: stroma of bone marrow; calvaria; body of femur; retinal pigment epithelium; granulocyte; cumulus cell; umbilical cord; skin of external ear; human fetus; endocardial cushion; More reference expression data |
| BioGPS | More reference expression data |
Gene ontology
| Molecular function | calcium ion binding; heparin binding; extracellular matrix binding; fibroblast growth factor binding; phosphatidylserine binding; proteoglycan binding; collagen V binding; fibrinogen binding; low-density lipoprotein particle binding; integrin binding; laminin binding; fibronectin binding; identical protein binding; transforming growth factor beta binding; protein binding; extracellular matrix structural constituent |
| Cellular component | endoplasmic reticulum lumen; platelet alpha granule; cell surface; endoplasmic reticulum; extracellular exosome; extracellular matrix; secretory granule; platelet alpha granule lumen; fibrinogen complex; sarcoplasmic reticulum; external side of plasma membrane; cytoplasm; extracellular space; extracellular region; collagen-containing extracellular matrix |
| Biological process | positive regulation of transforming growth factor beta receptor signaling pathway; cellular response to heat; negative regulation of fibrinolysis; protein O-linked fucosylation; response to progesterone; response to magnesium ion; positive regulation of translation; negative regulation of endothelial cell migration; negative regulation of cell-matrix adhesion; negative regulation of long-chain fatty acid import across plasma membrane; positive regulation of reactive oxygen species metabolic process; positive regulation of blood coagulation; positive regulation of blood vessel endothelial cell migration; positive regulation of macrophage chemotaxis; positive regulation of protein kinase B signaling; negative regulation of plasminogen activation; negative regulation of blood vessel endothelial cell migration; negative regulation of extrinsic apoptotic signaling pathway; response to endoplasmic reticulum stress; positive regulation of endothelial cell apoptotic process; response to unfolded protein; positive regulation of chemotaxis; negative regulation of cGMP-mediated signaling; positive regulation of phosphorylation; inflammatory response; negative regulation of focal adhesion assembly; chronic inflammatory response; negative regulation of nitric oxide mediated signal transduction; engulfment of apoptotic cell; extracellular matrix organization; positive regulation of macrophage activation; sprouting angiogenesis; negative regulation of apoptotic process; response to glucose; positive regulation of angiogenesis; response to calcium ion; positive regulation of transforming growth factor beta1 production; cell adhesion; behavioral response to pain; immune response; negative regulation of interleukin-12 production; positive regulation of extrinsic apoptotic signaling pathway via death domain receptors; negative regulation of cysteine-type endopeptidase activity involved in apoptotic process; response to hypoxia; positive regulation of cell migration; platelet degranulation; negative regulation of endothelial cell chemotaxis; negative regulation of endothelial cell proliferation; positive regulation of endothelial cell migration; negative regulation of fibroblast growth factor receptor signaling pathway; peptide cross-linking; negative regulation of antigen processing and presentation of peptide or polysaccharide antigen via MHC class II; negative regulation of dendritic cell antigen processing and presentation; negative regulation of angiogenesis; cell migration; positive regulation of fibroblast migration; response to testosterone; cellular response to tumor necrosis factor; cellular response to growth factor stimulus; positive regulation of transforming growth factor beta production; response to mechanical stimulus; positive regulation of cell population proliferation; positive regulation of smooth muscle cell proliferation; regulation of megakaryocyte differentiation; negative regulation of cell migration involved in sprouting angiogenesis; negative regulation of blood vessel endothelial cell proliferation involved in sprouting angiogenesis; negative regulation of sprouting angiogenesis |
Sources:Amigo / QuickGO
Orthologs
| Species | Human | Mouse |
| Entrez | 7057 | 21825 |
| Ensembl | ENSG00000137801 | ENSMUSG00000040152 |
| UniProt | P07996 | P35441 |
| RefSeq (mRNA) | NM_003246 | NM_011580; NM_001313914 |
| RefSeq (protein) | NP_003237 | n/a |
| Location (UCSC) | Chr 15: 39.58 – 39.6 Mb | Chr 2: 117.94 – 117.96 Mb |
| PubMed search |
- Wikidata
| View/Edit Human | View/Edit Mouse |

Thrombospondin 1, abbreviated as THBS1, is a protein that in humans is encoded by the THBS1 gene.

Thrombospondin 1 is a subunit of a disulfide-linked homotrimeric protein. This protein is an adhesive glycoprotein that mediates cell-to-cell and cell-to-matrix interactions. This protein can bind to fibrinogen, fibronectin, laminin, collagens types V and VII and integrins alpha-V/beta-1. This protein has been shown to play roles in platelet aggregation, angiogenesis, and tumorigenesis.

== Function ==
The thrombospondin-1 protein is a member of the thrombospondin family. It is a multi-domain matrix glycoprotein that has been shown to be a natural inhibitor of neovascularization and tumorigenesis in healthy tissue. Both positive and negative modulation of endothelial cell adhesion, motility, and growth have been attributed to TSP1. This should not be surprising considering that TSP1 interacts with at least 12 cell adhesion receptors, including CD36, αv integrins, β1 integrins, syndecan, and integrin-associated protein (IAP or CD47). It also interacts with numerous proteases involved in angiogenesis, including plasminogen, urokinase, matrix metalloproteinase, thrombin, cathepsin, and elastase.

Thrombospondin-1 binds to the reelin receptors, ApoER2 and VLDLR, thereby affecting neuronal migration in the rostral migratory stream.

The various functions of the TSRs have been attributed to several recognition motifs. Characterization of these motifs has led to the use of recombinant proteins that contain these motifs; these recombinant proteins are deemed useful in cancer therapy. The TSP-1 3TSR (a recombinant version of the THBS1 antiangiogenic domain containing all three thrombosopondin-1 type 1 repeats) can activate transforming growth factor beta 1 (TGFβ1) and inhibit endothelial cell migration, angiogenesis, and tumor growth.

== Structure ==
Thrombospondin's activity has been mapped to several domains, in particular the amino-terminal heparin-binding domain, the procollagen domain, the properdin-like type I repeats, and the globular carboxy-terminal domain. The protein also contains type II repeats with epidermal growth factor-like homology and type III repeats that contain an RGD sequence.

=== N-terminus ===
The N-terminal heparin-binding domain of TSP1, when isolated as a 25kDa fragment, has been shown to be a potent inducer of cell migration at high concentrations. However, when the heparin-binding domain of TSP1 is cleaved, the remaining anti-angiogenic domains have been shown to have decreased anti-angiogenic activity at low concentrations where increased endothelial cell (EC) migration occurs. This may be explained in part by the ability of the heparin-binding domain to mediate attachment of TSP1 to cells, allowing the other domains to exert their effects. The separate roles that the heparin-binding region of TSP1 plays at high versus low concentrations may be in part responsible for regulating the two-faced nature of TSP1 and giving it a reputation of being both a positive and negative regulator of angiogenesis.

=== Procollagen domain ===
Both the procollagen domain and the type I repeats of TSP1 have been shown to inhibit neovascularization and EC migration. However, it is unlikely that the mechanisms of action of these fragments are the same. The type I repeats of TSP1 are capable of inhibiting EC migration in a Boyden chamber assay after a 3-4 hour exposure, whereas a 36- to 48-hour exposure period is necessary for inhibition of EC migration with the procollagen domain. Whereas the chorioallantoic membrane (CAM) assay shows the type I repeats of TSP1 to be antiangiogenic, it also shows that the procollagen sequence lacks anti-angiogenic activity. This may be in part because the animo-terminal end of TSP1 differs more than the carboxy-terminal end across species, but may also suggest different mechanisms of action.

TSP1 contains three type I repeats, only the second two of which have been found to inhibit angiogenesis. The type I repeat motif is more effective than the entire protein at inhibiting angiogenesis and contains not one but two regions of activity. The amino-terminal end contains a tryptophan-rich motif that blocks fibroblast growth factor (FGF-2 or bFGF) driven angiogenesis. This region has also been found to prevent FGF-2 binding ECs, suggesting that its mechanism of action may be to sequester FGF-2. The second region of activity, the CD36 binding region of TSP1, can be found on the carboxy-terminal half of the type I repeats. It has been suggested that activating the CD36 receptor causes an increase in ECs sensitivity to apoptotic signals. Type I repeats have also been shown to bind to heparin, fibronectin, TGF-β, and others, potentially antagonizing the effects of these molecules on ECs. However, CD36 is generally considered to be the dominant inhibitory signaling receptor for TSP1, and EC expression of CD36 is restricted to microvascular ECs.

Soluble type I repeats have been shown to decrease EC numbers by inhibiting proliferation and promoting apoptosis. Attachment of endothelial cells to fibronectin partially reverses this phenomenon. However this domain is not without a two-faced nature of its own. Bound protein fragments of the type I repeats have been shown to serve as attachment factors for both ECs and melanoma cells.

=== C-terminus ===
The carboxy-terminal domain of TSP1 is believed to mediate cellular attachment and has been found to bind to another important receptor for TSP1, IAP (or CD47). This receptor is considered necessary for nitric oxide-stimulated TSP1-mediated vascular cell responses and cGMP signaling. Various domains of and receptors for TSP1 have been shown to have pro-adhesive and chemotactic activities for cancer cells, suggesting that this molecule may have a direct effect on cancer cell biology independent of its anti-angiogenic properties.

== Cancer treatment ==
One study conducted in mice has suggested that, by blocking TSP1 from binding to its cell surface receptor (CD47) normal tissue confers high resistance to cancer radiation therapy and assists in tumor death.

However, the majority of studies of cancer using mouse models, demonstrate that TSP1 inhibits tumor progression by inhibiting angiogenesis. Moreover, stimulating TSP1 via over-expressing prosaposin or treating with a small prosaposin-derived peptide potently inhibits and even induces regression of existing tumors in mice.

== Interactions ==
Thrombospondin 1 has been shown to interact with:

- LRP1,
- MMP-2, and
- Plasmin.
