= Collectin of 43 kDa =

Protein

Collectin of 43 kDa (CL-43) is a collectin protein that acts as an antigen recognition protein. When an agent, zymosan, was injected into the tunicate Styela plicata (causing inflammation), secretion of this collectin was tripled within 96 hours.
