= Collectin of 46 kDa =

Protein

Collectin of 46 kDa (CL-46) is a collectin protein. It has two cysteine residues on the N-terminal segment, a hydrophilic loop near the carbohydrate recognition domain's binding site, and a N-glycosylation site in the collagen region. It is expressed in bovine liver and thymus glands and binds to pathogens, prompting elimination by macrophages.
