= Surfactant protein A =

Protein family

surfactant, pulmonary-associated protein A1

Identifiers
- Symbol: SFTPA1
- Alt. symbols: SFTP1
- NCBI gene: 6435
- HGNC: 10798
- OMIM: 178630
- RefSeq: NM_005411
- UniProt: Q8IWL2

Other data
- Locus: Chr. 10 q22.3
Search for
- Structures: Swiss-model
- Domains: InterPro

surfactant, pulmonary-associated protein A2B

Identifiers
- Symbol: SFTPA2B
- NCBI gene: 6436
- HGNC: 10799
- OMIM: 178642
- RefSeq: NM_006926
- UniProt: Q8IWL1

Other data
- Locus: Chr. 10 q22.3
Search for
- Structures: Swiss-model
- Domains: InterPro

Surfactant protein A is an innate immune system collectin. It is water-soluble and has collagen-like domains similar to SP-D. It is part of the innate immune system and is used to opsonize bacterial cells in the alveoli marking them for phagocytosis by alveolar macrophages. SP-A may also play a role in negative feedback limiting the secretion of pulmonary surfactant. SP-A is not required for pulmonary surfactant to function but does confer immune effects to the organism.

== During parturition ==
The role of surfactant protein A (SP-A) in childbirth is indicated in studies with mice. Mice which gestate for 19 days typically show signs of SP-A in amniotic fluid at around 16 days. If SP-A is injected into the uterus at 15 days, mice typically deliver early. Inversely, an SP-A inhibitor injection causes notable delays in birth.

The presence of surfactant protein A seemed to trigger an inflammatory response in the uterus of the mice, but later studies found an anti-inflammatory response in humans. In fact, the level of SP-A in a human uterus typically decreases during labor.

== Immune functions ==
Research on SP-A has been done mainly in rodents including mice and rats. This research has shown that mice deficient in SP-A are more susceptible to infections from group B streptoccoal organisms, Pseudomonas aeruginosa, and likely other organisms. The immune functions of SP-A are time-, temperature-, and concentration-dependent.

== Location ==
SP-A is found in the pulmonary surfactant in lungs. SP-A and SP-D are also present in extrapulmonary tissues.

== See also ==
- pulmonary surfactant
- SFTPA1
- SFTPA2
