= CD47 =

Protein-coding gene in humans

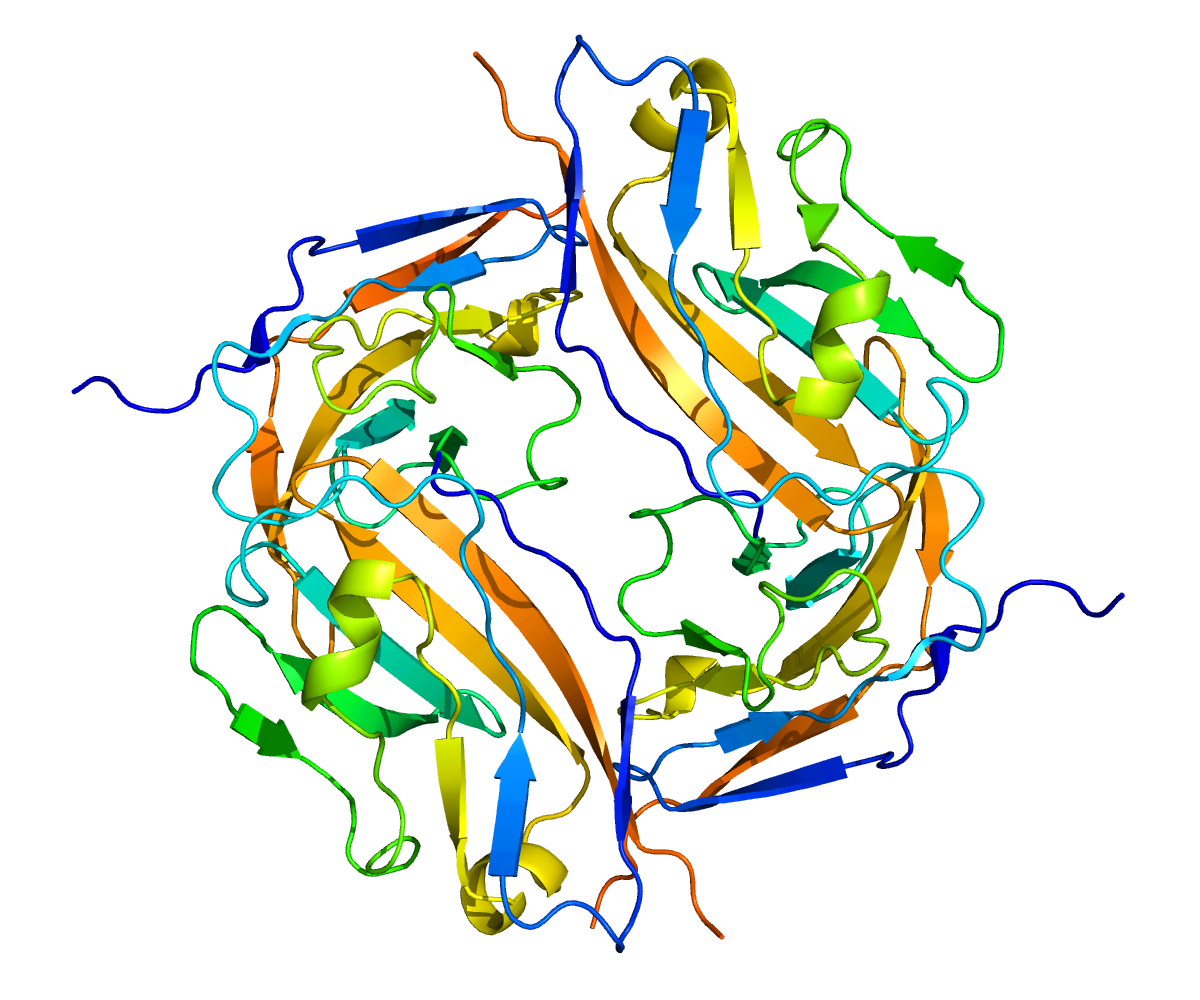

Identifiers
- Aliases: CD47, IAP, MER6, OA3, CD47 molecule
- External IDs: OMIM: 601028; MGI: 96617; GeneCards: CD47
Available structures
| PDB | Ortholog search: PDBe RCSB |
| PDB | List of PDB id codes 2JJS, 2JJT, 2VSC, 4CMM, 4KJY, 5IWL |

Gene location (Human)
| Chr. | Chromosome 3 (human) |
| Band | 3q13.12 | Start | 108,043,091 bp |
| Band | 3q13.12 | End | 108,091,862 bp |

Gene location (Mouse)
| Chr. | Chromosome 16 (mouse) |
| Band | 16|16 B5 | Start | 49,620,896 bp |
| Band | 16|16 B5 | End | 49,735,373 bp |
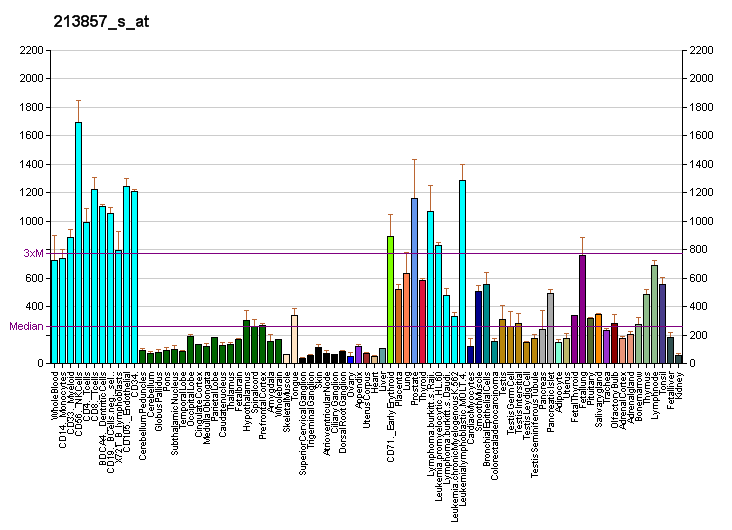

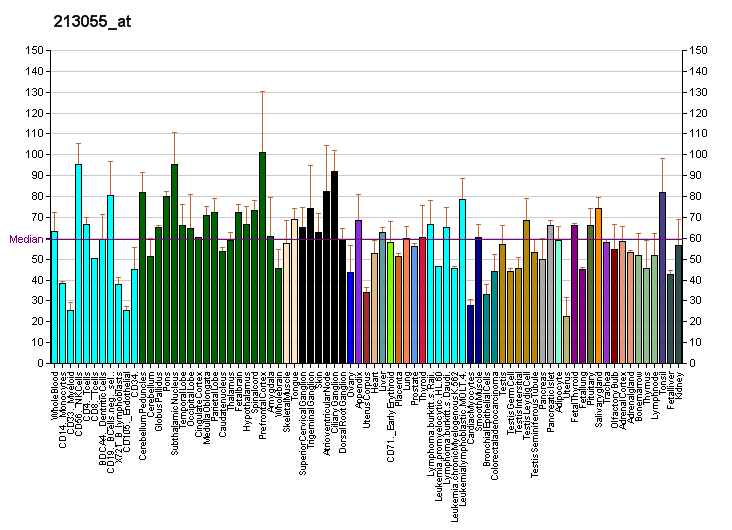

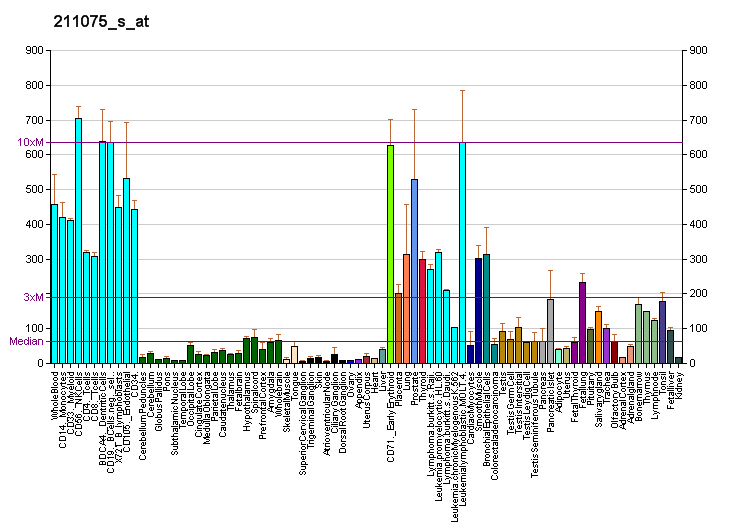
RNA expression pattern
| Bgee | Human / Mouse (ortholog); Top expressed in: gingival epithelium; palpebral conjunctiva; germinal epithelium; visceral pleura; right uterine tube; pancreatic epithelial cell; epithelium of nasopharynx; Brodmann area 23; tibia; pancreatic ductal cell / Top expressed in: fetal liver hematopoietic progenitor cell; tibiofemoral joint; blood; medial dorsal nucleus; cingulate gyrus; lateral geniculate nucleus; sciatic nerve; cerebellar vermis; gastrula; spleen; More reference expression data |
| BioGPS | More reference expression data |
Gene ontology
| Molecular function | thrombospondin receptor activity; protein binding; protein binding involved in heterotypic cell-cell adhesion; cell-cell adhesion mediator activity |
| Cellular component | integral component of membrane; plasma membrane; integral component of plasma membrane; membrane; specific granule membrane; tertiary granule membrane; extracellular exosome; cell surface |
| Biological process | integrin-mediated signaling pathway; positive regulation of phagocytosis; cell adhesion; extracellular matrix organization; positive regulation of inflammatory response; positive regulation of T cell activation; response to bacterium; leukocyte migration; positive regulation of cell population proliferation; opsonization; positive regulation of cell-cell adhesion; neutrophil degranulation; cell migration; regulation of interferon-gamma production; regulation of interleukin-10 production; regulation of interleukin-12 production; regulation of interleukin-6 production; regulation of tumor necrosis factor production; heterotypic cell-cell adhesion; monocyte extravasation; regulation of nitric oxide biosynthetic process; positive regulation of stress fiber assembly; cellular response to interferon-gamma; cellular response to interleukin-1; cellular response to interleukin-12; cell-cell adhesion; negative regulation of Fc-gamma receptor signaling pathway involved in phagocytosis |
Sources:Amigo / QuickGO
Orthologs
| Databases | NCBI: entry; OMA: entry |
| Species | Human | Mouse |
| Entrez | 961 | 16423 |
| Ensembl | ENSG00000196776 | ENSMUSG00000055447 |
| UniProt | Q08722 | Q61735 |
| RefSeq (mRNA) | NM_001025079; NM_001025080; NM_001777; NM_198793; NM_001382306 | NM_010581; NM_001368415; NM_001368416; NM_001368417; NM_001368418 |
| RefSeq (protein) | NP_001768; NP_942088; NP_001369235 | NP_034711; NP_001355344; NP_001355345; NP_001355346; NP_001355347 |
| Location (UCSC) | Chr 3: 108.04 – 108.09 Mb | Chr 16: 49.62 – 49.74 Mb |
| PubMed search |
- Wikidata
| View/Edit Human | View/Edit Mouse |

CD47 (Cluster of Differentiation 47) also known as integrin associated protein (IAP) is a transmembrane protein that in humans is encoded by the CD47 gene. CD47 belongs to the immunoglobulin superfamily and partners with membrane integrins and also binds the ligands thrombospondin 1 (TSP-1) and signal-regulatory protein alpha (SIRPα). CD-47 acts as a don't eat me signal to macrophages of the immune system which has made it a potential therapeutic target in some cancers, and more recently, for the treatment of pulmonary fibrosis.

CD47 is involved in a range of cellular processes, including apoptosis, proliferation, adhesion, and migration. Furthermore, it plays a role in insulin secretion, as well as immune and angiogenic responses. CD47 is ubiquitously expressed in human cells and has been found to be overexpressed in many different tumor cells. Expression in equine cutaneous tumors has been reported as well.

== Structure ==
CD47 is a 50 kDa membrane receptor that has extracellular N-terminal IgV domain, five transmembrane domains, and a short C-terminal intracellular tail. There are four alternatively spliced isoforms of CD47 that differ only in the length of their cytoplasmic tail.

Form 2 is the most widely expressed form that is found in all circulating and immune cells. The second most abundant isoform is form 4, which is predominantly expressed in the brain and in the peripheral nervous system. Only keratinocytes expressed significant amounts of form 1. Little is known about the functional significance of this alternative splicing. However, these isoforms are highly conserved between mouse and man, suggesting an important role for the cytoplasmic domains in CD47 function.

== Interactions ==
=== Thrombospondin (TSP) ===
CD47 is a high affinity receptor for thrombospondin-1 (TSP-1), a secreted glycoprotein that plays a role in vascular development and angiogenesis, and in this later capacity the TSP1-CD47 interaction inhibits nitric oxide signaling at multiple levels in vascular cells. Binding of TSP-1 to CD47 influences several fundamental cellular functions including cell migration and adhesion, cell proliferation or apoptosis, and plays a role in the regulation of angiogenesis and inflammation.

=== Signal-regulatory protein (SIRP) ===
CD47 interacts with signal-regulatory protein alpha (SIRPα), an inhibitory transmembrane receptor present on myeloid cells. The CD47/SIRPα interaction leads to bidirectional signaling, resulting in different cell-to-cell responses including inhibition of phagocytosis, stimulation of cell-cell fusion, and T-cell activation.

=== Integrins ===
CD47 interacts with several membrane integrins, most commonly integrin α_{V}β_{3}. These interactions result in CD47/integrin complexes that affect a range of cell functions including adhesion, spreading and migration.

== Function ==
=== Tumor cells ===
Due to the ubiquitous expression of CD47, signaling differs according to cell type. It is likely that intracellular and membrane-associated partners are crucial in determining the cellular response of CD47 signaling.

==== Cell proliferation ====
The role of CD47 in promoting cell proliferation is heavily dependent on cell type as both activation and loss of CD47 can result in enhanced proliferation.

Activation of CD47 with TSP-1 increases proliferation of human U-87 MG and U373 astrocytoma cells but not normal astrocytes. Additionally, CD47 blocking antibodies inhibit proliferation of unstimulated astrocytoma cells but not normal astrocytes. Though the exact mechanism is unclear, it is likely that CD47 promotes proliferation via the PI3K/Akt pathway in cancerous cells but not normal cells.

Loss of CD47 allows sustained proliferation of primary murine endothelial cells and enables these cells to spontaneously reprogram to form multipotent embryoid body-like clusters. Expression of several stem cell markers, including c-Myc, is elevated in CD47-null endothelial cells and a human T cell line lacking CD47. Activation of CD47 with TSP-1 in wild-type cells inhibits proliferation and reduces expression of stem cell transcription factors.

==== Cell death ====
CD47 ligation leads to cell death in many normal and tumor cell lines via apoptosis or autophagy. The activation of CD47 induces rapid apoptosis of T cells. Jurkat cells and peripheral blood mononuclear cells (PBMC) incubated with the monoclonal antibody Ad22 results in apoptosis within 3 hours. However, apoptosis was not observed following culture with other anti-CD47 antibodies. The apoptosis inducing function of CD47 appears to be dependent on activation of specific epitopes on the extracellular domain.

Similarly, CD47 ligation rapidly induces apoptosis in B-cell chronic lymphocytic leukemia (CLL) cells. Treatment with a disulfide-linked antibody dimer induces apoptosis of CD47-positive primary B-CLL and leukemic cells (MOLT-4 and JOK-1). In addition, administration of the antibody prolonged survival of SCID mice implanted with JOK-1 cells. Apoptosis induction appears to be regulated by the hypoxia inducible factor 1α (HIF-1α) pathway.

The RAS-transformed cell lines MDFB6 and B6ras show near complete loss of TSP-1 expression. Activation of CD47 with TSP-1 results in loss of viability in these RAS-expressing cells. Affected cells do not exhibit hallmarks of apoptosis but rather autophagy as seen by staining with acridine orange and immunoreactivity for LC3.

==== Migration ====
Cell migration appears to be universally stimulated by CD47 ligation and activation. The role of CD47 in cell migration was first demonstrated for neutrophils, where CD47 blocking antibodies inhibited transmigration of neutrophils and monocytes through the endothelium. These effects were shown to be dependent on avb3 integrins, which interact with and are activated by CD47 at the plasma membrane.

Originally discovered by Irving Weissman's group at Stanford University, blocking CD47 function has been shown to inhibit migration and metastasis in a variety of tumor models. Blockade of CD47 by neutralizing antibodies reduced migration and chemotaxis in response to collagen IV in melanoma, prostate cancer and ovarian cancer-derived cells. In a mouse model of multiple myeloma, tumor metastasis to bone was decreased in CD47-deficient mice compared with wild type controls. In work led by Mark Chao and Ash Alizadeh, at Stanford, mice were xenografted with human non-Hodgkin lymphoma (NHL) cells; blocking CD47 function with shRNA or antibodies led to a dramatic reduction in metastasis to major organs.

=== Stromal cells ===
==== Angiogenesis ====
Loss of CD47 promotes proliferation and increases asymmetric division of primary murine endothelial cells. Additionally, activation of CD47 with TSP-1 in wild-type primary mouse cerebral endothelial cells induces cytotoxicity, which is significantly decreased in cerebral endothelial cells derived from CD47 knockout mice.

CD47 signaling may suppress angiogenesis as TSP-1 activation significantly inhibited endothelial cell migration and tube formation in vitro. In vivo, injections of TSP-1 in mice after hindlimb ischemia induces a significant decrease of blood flow recovery. The mechanism of the anti-angiogenic activity of CD47 is not fully understood, but introduction of CD47 antibodies and TSP-1 have been shown to inhibit nitric oxide (NO)-stimulated responses in both endothelial and vascular smooth muscle cells. CD47 signaling influences the SDF-1 chemokine pathway, which plays a role in angiogenesis.

==== Inflammatory response ====
Interactions between endothelial cell CD47 and leukocyte SIRPγ regulate T cell transendothelial migration (TEM) at sites of inflammation. CD47 knockout mice show reduced recruitment of blood T cells as well as neutrophils and monocytes in areas of inflammation. CD47 also functions as a marker of self on murine red blood cells which allows RBC to avoid phagocytosis. Red blood cells that lack CD47 are rapidly cleared from the bloodstream by macrophages, a process that is mediated by interaction with SIRPα. Mouse hematopoietic stem cells (HSCs) and progenitors transiently upregulate CD47 during their migratory phase, which reduces macrophage engulfment in vivo.

Tumor cells can also evade macrophage phagocytosis through the expression of CD47. CD47 is highly expressed in bladder tumor initiating cells (T-ICs) compared with the rest of the tumor. Blockade of CD47 with a monoclonal antibody results in macrophage engulfment of bladder cancer cells in vitro. CD47 is also upregulated in mouse and human myeloid leukemias, and overexpression of CD47 on a myeloid leukemia line allows these cells to evade phagocytosis.

==== Insulin secretion ====
CD47 receptor signaling inhibits insulin release from human as well as mouse pancreatic β cells and that it can be pharmacologically blocked to boost insulin secretion in both models.

== Clinical significance ==
CD47 was first identified as a tumor antigen on human ovarian cancer in the 1980s. Since then, CD47 has been found to be expressed on multiple human tumor types including acute myeloid leukemia (AML), chronic myeloid leukemia, acute lymphoblastic leukemia (ALL), non-Hodgkin's lymphoma (NHL), multiple myeloma (MM), bladder cancer, and other solid tumors. CD47 is also highly expressed on pediatric and adult brain tumors.

High levels of CD47 allows cancer cells to avoid phagocytosis despite having a higher level of calreticulin - the dominant pro-phagocytic signal. This is due to engagement of the SIRP-α of macrophage by CD47. Engagement of SIRP-α leads to inhibition of phagocytosis. Thus blocking CD47 with antibody turns off "don't eat me" signal and favors phagocytosis.

=== As a potential drug target ===
Anti-CD47 antibody–mediated phagocytosis of cancer fosters the activation of cancer-specific lymphocytes: cancer cells display mutant proteins to which the immune system can now react. Based on significant activity in preclinical models and in synergistic combinations with other antibodies, Humanized anti-CD47 antibody is being evaluated for the treatment of various cancers, e.g. diffuse large B-cell lymphoma (DLBCL), follicular lymphoma (FL), Primary Effusion Lymphoma and acute myeloid leukemia (AML).

== See also ==
- Cluster of differentiation
- Anti-CD47 therapy
