= Surfactant protein D =

Protein-coding gene in the species Homo sapiens

SFTPD
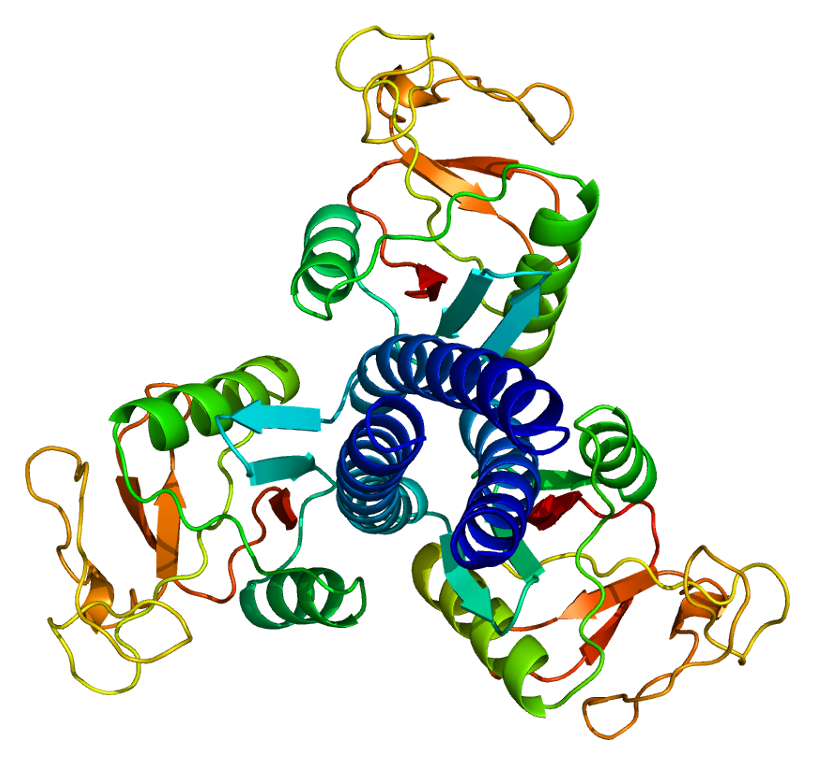

Identifiers
- Aliases: SFTPD, COLEC7, PSP-D, SFTP4, SP-D, surfactant protein D
- External IDs: OMIM: 178635; MGI: 109515; GeneCards: SFTPD
Available structures
PDB	Ortholog search: PDBe RCSB
PDB	List of PDB id codes 1B08, 1M7L, 1PW9, 1PWB, 2GGU, 2GGX, 2ORJ, 2ORK, 2OS9, 2RIA, 2RIB, 2RIC, 2RID, 2RIE, 3DBZ, 3G81, 3G83, 3G84, 3IKN, 3IKP, 3IKQ, 3IKR, 4E52, 4M17, 4M18

Gene location (Human)
Chr.	Chromosome 10 (human)
Band	10q22.3	Start	79,937,467 bp
Band	10q22.3	End	79,982,614 bp

Gene location (Mouse)
Chr.	Chromosome 14 (mouse)
Band	14 B|14 22.36 cM	Start	40,894,171 bp
Band	14 B|14 22.36 cM	End	40,907,106 bp
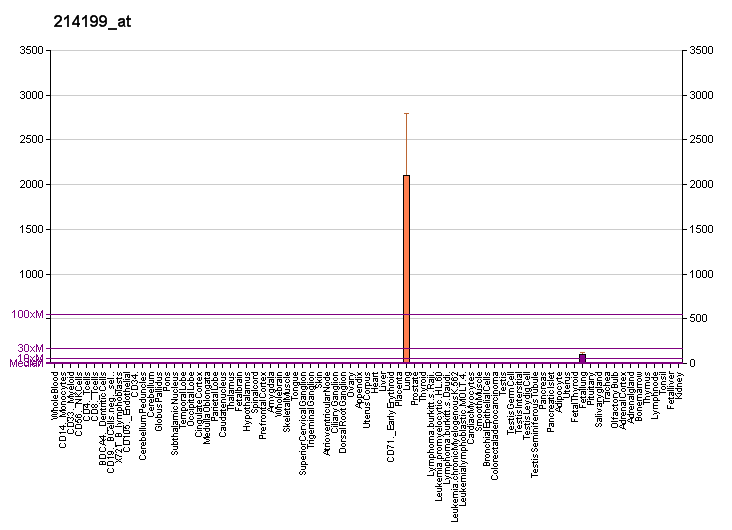
RNA expression pattern
Bgee	Human / Mouse (ortholog); Top expressed in: lower lobe of lung; visceral pleura; upper lobe of lung; upper lobe of left lung; right lung; testicle; germinal epithelium; body of pancreas; skin of leg; left lobe of thyroid gland / Top expressed in: right lung; right lung lobe; left lung; left lung lobe; lacrimal gland; trachea; olfactory epithelium; parotid gland; uterus; conjunctival fornix; More reference expression data
BioGPS	More reference expression data
Gene ontology
Molecular function	protein binding; carbohydrate binding; identical protein binding; lipopolysaccharide binding; monosaccharide binding
Cellular component	cytoplasm; collagen; endoplasmic reticulum membrane; clathrin-coated endocytic vesicle; endocytic vesicle; extracellular region; lysosome; extracellular space; multivesicular body; rough endoplasmic reticulum
Biological process	surfactant homeostasis; positive regulation of phagocytosis; immune system process; receptor-mediated endocytosis; respiratory gaseous exchange by respiratory system; reactive oxygen species metabolic process; regulation of cytokine production; negative regulation of T cell proliferation; macrophage chemotaxis; defense response to bacterium; regulation of immune response; lung alveolus development; innate immune response; toll-like receptor signaling pathway; induction of bacterial agglutination; regulation of adhesion of symbiont to host epithelial cell; developmental process
Sources:Amigo / QuickGO
Orthologs
Databases	NCBI: entry; OMA: entry
Species	Human	Mouse
Entrez	6441	20390
Ensembl	ENSG00000133661	ENSMUSG00000021795
UniProt	P35247	P50404
RefSeq (mRNA)	NM_003019	NM_009160
RefSeq (protein)	NP_003010	NP_033186
Location (UCSC)	Chr 10: 79.94 – 79.98 Mb	Chr 14: 40.89 – 40.91 Mb
PubMed search
- Wikidata
View/Edit Human	View/Edit Mouse

Surfactant protein D, also known as SP-D, is a lung surfactant protein part of the collagenous family of lectins called collectin. In humans, SP-D is encoded by the SFTPD gene and is part of the innate immune system. Each SP-D subunit is composed of an N-terminal domain, a collagenous region, a nucleating neck region, and a C-terminal lectin domain. Three of these subunits assemble to form a homotrimer, which further assemble into a tetrameric complex.

== Interactions ==
Surfactant protein D has been shown to interact with DMBT1, and hemagglutinin of influenza A virus. Post-translational modification of SP-D i.e. S-nitrosylation switches its function.

== See also ==
- Pulmonary surfactant
- Pulmonary surfactant protein D
