= Collectin =

Part of the innate immune system

Collectins, col-lectins, (collagen-containing C-type lectins) are a part of the innate immune system. They form a sub-family of collagenous Ca^{2+}-dependent lectins of the family of C-type lectins, which are found in animals. Collectins are soluble pattern recognition receptors (PRRs). Their function is to bind to oligosaccharide structure or lipids that are on the surface of microorganisms. Like other PRRs they bind pathogen-associated molecular patterns (PAMPs) and damage-associated molecular patterns (DAMPs) of oligosaccharide origin. Binding of collectins to microorganisms may trigger elimination of microorganisms by aggregation, complement activation, opsonization, activation of phagocytosis, or inhibition of microbial growth. Other functions of collectins are modulation of inflammatory, allergic responses, adaptive immune system and clearance of apoptotic cells.

== Structure ==
Functionally collectins are trimers. Monomeric subunit consists of four parts:

- a cysteine-rich domain at the N-terminus
- a collagen-like domain
- a coiled-coil neck domain
- a C-type lectin domain that is also called a carbohydrate recognition domain (CRD)

Recognition of specific parts of microorganism is mediated by CRD in presence of calcium. Affinity of interaction between microbes and collectins depends on the degree of collectin oligomerization and also on the density of ligands on the surface of the microbe.

== Types of collectins ==
Nine types of collectins have been defined:

- MBL = mannan-binding lectin (mannose-binding lectin)
- SP-A = surfactant protein A
- SP-D = surfactant protein D
- CL-L1 = collectin liver 1
- CL-P1 = collectin placenta 1
- CL-43 = Collectin of 43 kDa
- CL-46 = collectin of 46 kDa
- CL-K1 = collectin kidney 1
- Conglutinin

CL-43, CL-46 and conglutinin are found in bovines.

== Function ==
=== Aggregation ===
Collectins can bind to the surface of microorganisms and between carbohydrate ligands. Due to these properties, the interaction can result in aggregation.

=== Opsonization and activation of phagocytosis ===
Collectins can act as opsonins. There is a specific interaction between collectins and receptors on phagocytic cells which can lead to increased clearance of microorganisms. MBL can bind to microorganisms and this interaction can lead to opsonization through complement activation, or it can opsonize the microorganism directly. SP-A and SP-D can also interact with microorganisms and phagocytic cells to enhance phagocytosis of the microorganism.

=== Inhibition of microbial growth ===
Collectins have effect on microorganism survival. SP-A and SP-D can bind to LPS (lipopolysaccharide) of both Gram-negative and Gram-positive bacteria. SP-A and SP-D can increase permeability of Gram-negative bacterial cell membrane.

=== Modulation of inflammatory responses ===
SP-A and SP-D can damp induction of inflammation by LPS or endotoxin. It can be caused by removing the LPS or by binding the LPS to CD14 receptor on macrophages that can block the inflammatory response. SP-A can also bind to TLR2 (toll-like receptor 2). This interaction causes decrease of TNF-α (tumor necrosis factor-α) production by alveolar macrophages stimulated with peptidoglycan. SP-A and SP-D can modulate cytokine production. They modulate the production of oxygen and nitrogen reactive species which are very important for phagocytic cells. SP-A and SP-D has s function as chemoattractants for alveolar neutrophils and monocytes. MBL can recognize peptidoglycan via N-acetylglucosamine. This interaction leads to inhibition of ligand-induced inflammatory by macrophage chemokine production.

=== Modulation of the adaptive immune system ===
SP-A and SP-D can suppress activated T-lymphocytes and IL-2 (interleukin-2) production. SP-D increases bacterial antigen presentation by dendritic cells whereas SP-A blocs differentation of the immature dendritic cells.

=== Modulation of allergic response ===
Collectins SP-A and SP-D have anti-allergic effects: they inhibit IgE binding to allergens, decrease histamine release from basophils, and inhibit T-lymphocyte production in the late phase of the inflammation.

=== Apoptosis ===
Collectins SP-A and SP-D enhance clearance of apoptotic cells by macrophages.

=== Complement activation ===
Collectins are linked with activation of lectin pathway of complement activation. At the beginning, there is a binding of collectin to PAMPs or DAMPs. Collectin MBL is involved in activation of the lectin complement pathway. There are three serine proteases, MASP-1, 2 and 3 (MBL-associated serine proteases), which participate in activation of the lectin pathway. MASP-2 has a cleavage activity and it is essential for forming lectin C3 and C5 convertases and for activation of the complement.

== Reviews ==
For more information and details see reviews:
