= Src homology 2 domain containing F =

Protein-coding gene in the species Homo sapiens

SHF

Identifiers
- Aliases: SHF, Src homology 2 domain containing F
- External IDs: OMIM: 617313; MGI: 3613669; GeneCards: SHF

Gene location (Human)
Chr.	Chromosome 15 (human)
Band	15q21.1	Start	45,167,214 bp
Band	15q21.1	End	45,201,175 bp

Gene location (Mouse)
Chr.	Chromosome 2 (mouse)
Band	2|2 E5	Start	122,179,373 bp
Band	2|2 E5	End	122,199,643 bp
RNA expression pattern
Bgee	Human / Mouse (ortholog); Top expressed in: cerebellar hemisphere; right hemisphere of cerebellum; ganglionic eminence; right lobe of liver; ventricular zone; left ovary; right frontal lobe; right ovary; prefrontal cortex; nucleus accumbens / Top expressed in: cerebellar cortex; lobe of cerebellum; cerebellar vermis; dentate gyrus of hippocampal formation granule cell; superior frontal gyrus; primary visual cortex; lip; ganglionic eminence; spinal ganglia; ventricular zone; More reference expression data
BioGPS	n/a
Orthologs
Databases	NCBI: entry; OMA: entry
Species	Human	Mouse
Entrez	90525	435684
Ensembl	ENSG00000138606	ENSMUSG00000033256
UniProt	Q7M4L6	Q8CG80
RefSeq (mRNA)	NM_001301168; NM_001301169; NM_001301170; NM_001301171; NM_138356	NM_001013829; NM_001374011
RefSeq (protein)	NP_001288097; NP_001288098; NP_001288099; NP_001288100; NP_612365	NP_001013851; NP_001360940
Location (UCSC)	Chr 15: 45.17 – 45.2 Mb	Chr 2: 122.18 – 122.2 Mb
PubMed search
- Wikidata
View/Edit Human	View/Edit Mouse

Src homology 2 domain containing F is a protein that in humans is encoded by the SHF gene.
